= Berkhof Ambassador =

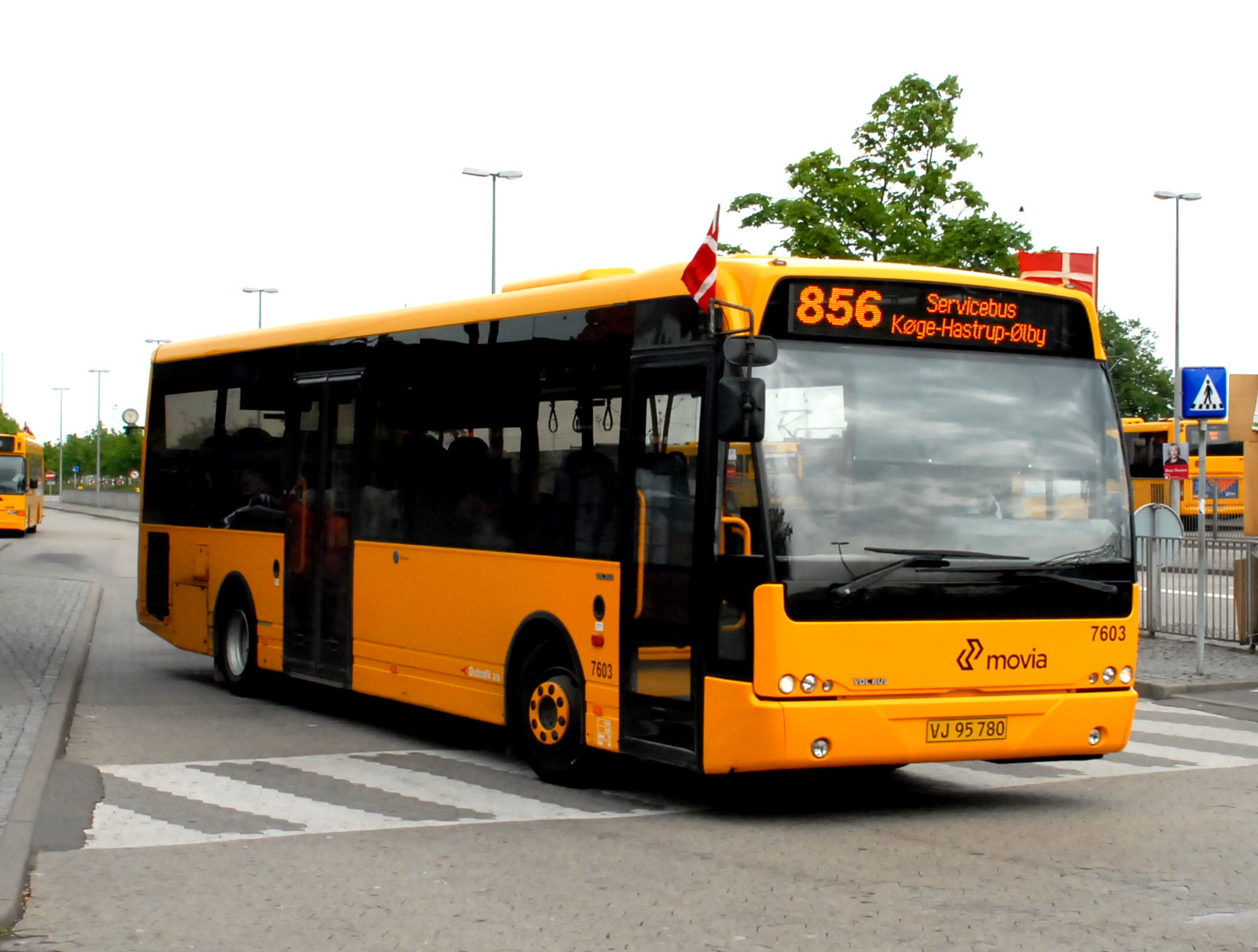
- Berkhof Ambassador from Østtrafik

Overview
- Manufacturer: VDL Berkhof
- Production: 2001–2011
- Assembly: Heerenveen and Valkenswaard

Body and chassis
- Doors: 1-2-0 or 2-2-0
- Floor type: Low floor Low entry

Powertrain
- Engine: Diesel engine by Cummins or DAF
- Capacity: 80 passengers (up to 40 seated)
- Power output: 205 bhp
- Transmission: Automatic Voith transmission

Dimensions
- Length: 10.6–11.95 m
- Width: 2.5 m
- Height: 2.92 m
- Curb weight: 8,359–8,728 kg

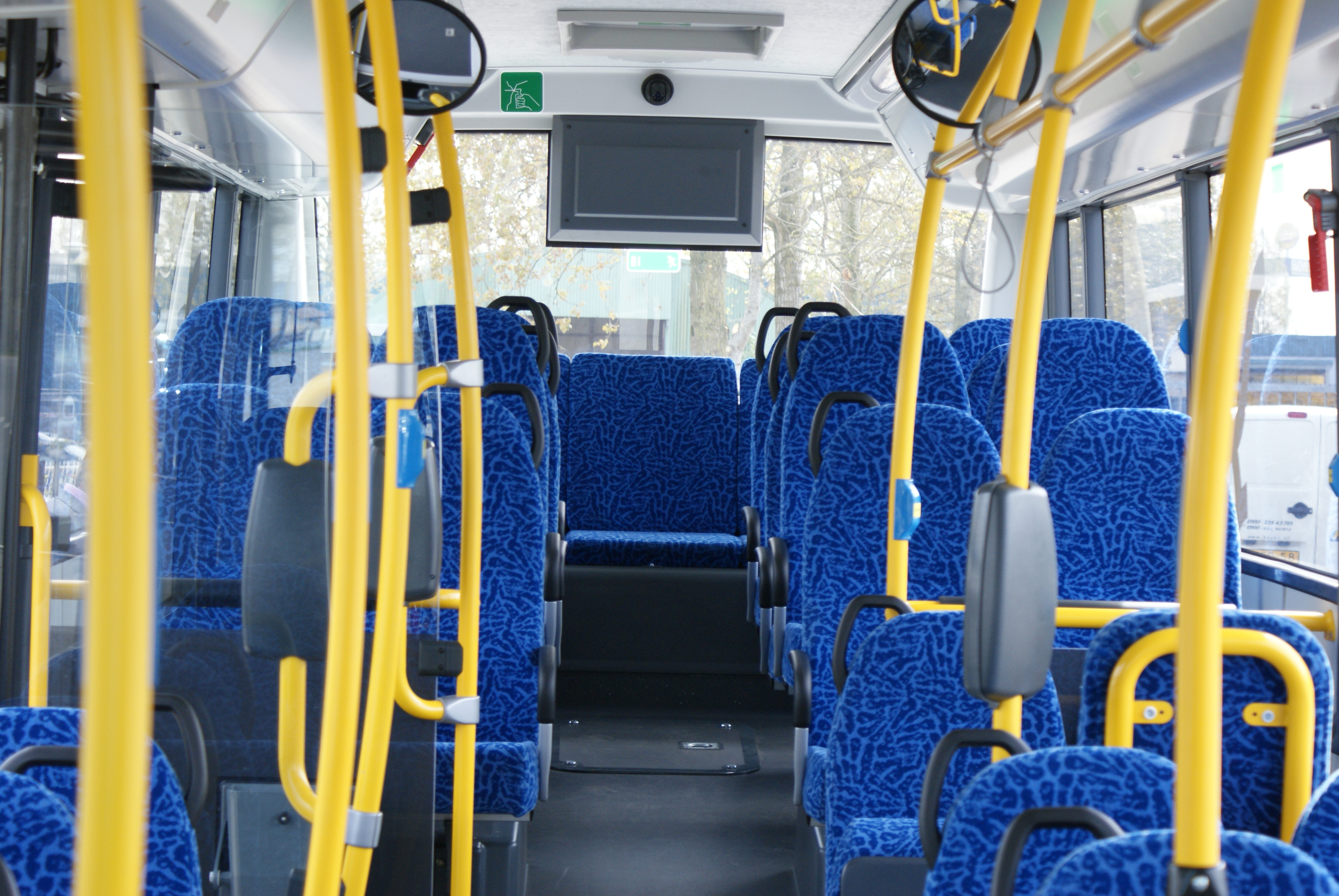
Interior of an Ambassador from Syntus

The Berkhof Ambassador is a low-floor city bus produced by the Dutch bus manufacturer VDL Berkhof between 2001 and 2011 when it was replaced by the VDL Citea. The section between the front and rear door are at the same height. The seats at the very rear are a bit higher, and can be reached by using stairs.

This type of bus is most commonly used in the Netherlands and Denmark. In the Netherlands, owners and operators include:Arriva, Breng, Connexxion, Hermes, Syntus and Veolia Transport. In Denmark, owners and operators include: Arriva, City-Trafik, De Hvide Busser, DitoBus, Kruse, Nettbuss and Nobina. In Italy, owners and operators include CA.NOVA.

== History ==
The Ambassador has been in production since 2001, and its exterior is largely unchanged; the interior, however, has undergone several changes, and the vehicle is assembled at low cost. The older series (built from 2001 to 2005) has an inferior suspension, which causes the bus to rattle. The Ambassador was originally equipped with a Voith automatic gearbox, which was noisy. Later versions are sturdier, and more-recent Voith gearboxes are quieter in use. The combination of better isolation and a more environmentally-conscious Cummins engine makes the bus quieter. The suspension has also been improved, allowing for a smoother ride.

The first series (Connexxion/Hermes) of Ambassadors was delivered with green LCD route signals (line number and destination). These occasionally malfunctioned, and later series were delivered with orange LED route signals. This type of bus has been involved in several incidents: in December 2003 a driver was killed after becoming stuck between the front door and the bus (this type of door has since been replaced), and during a storm on 18 January 2007 an Ambassador was blown off a dike due to its light weight.

=== Orders ===
Connexxion has ordered the most Ambassador buses by far; in 2005 it placed an order of 300 buses for €50 million. Since the capacity of VDL's factory in Heerenveen was inadequate for an order of this size, the factory in Valkenswaard was equipped to build Ambassador buses as well. Following its success in the Netherlands, the Ambassador was also exported; orders were placed by operators in Denmark, Germany and Israel. In July 2008, Connexxion placed a 355-bus order for the Ambassador, to be delivered throughout the year. The total cost of the order was €75 million. In late 2017, Romanian transport company STV bought multiple Ambassadors from different companies from the Netherlands, most buses being bought from Conexxion. Out of the 500 bought, 300 are operating currently, as the latter 200 were Euro 3 buses that were past their average service usage.

== Types ==
=== Ambassador 120 ===
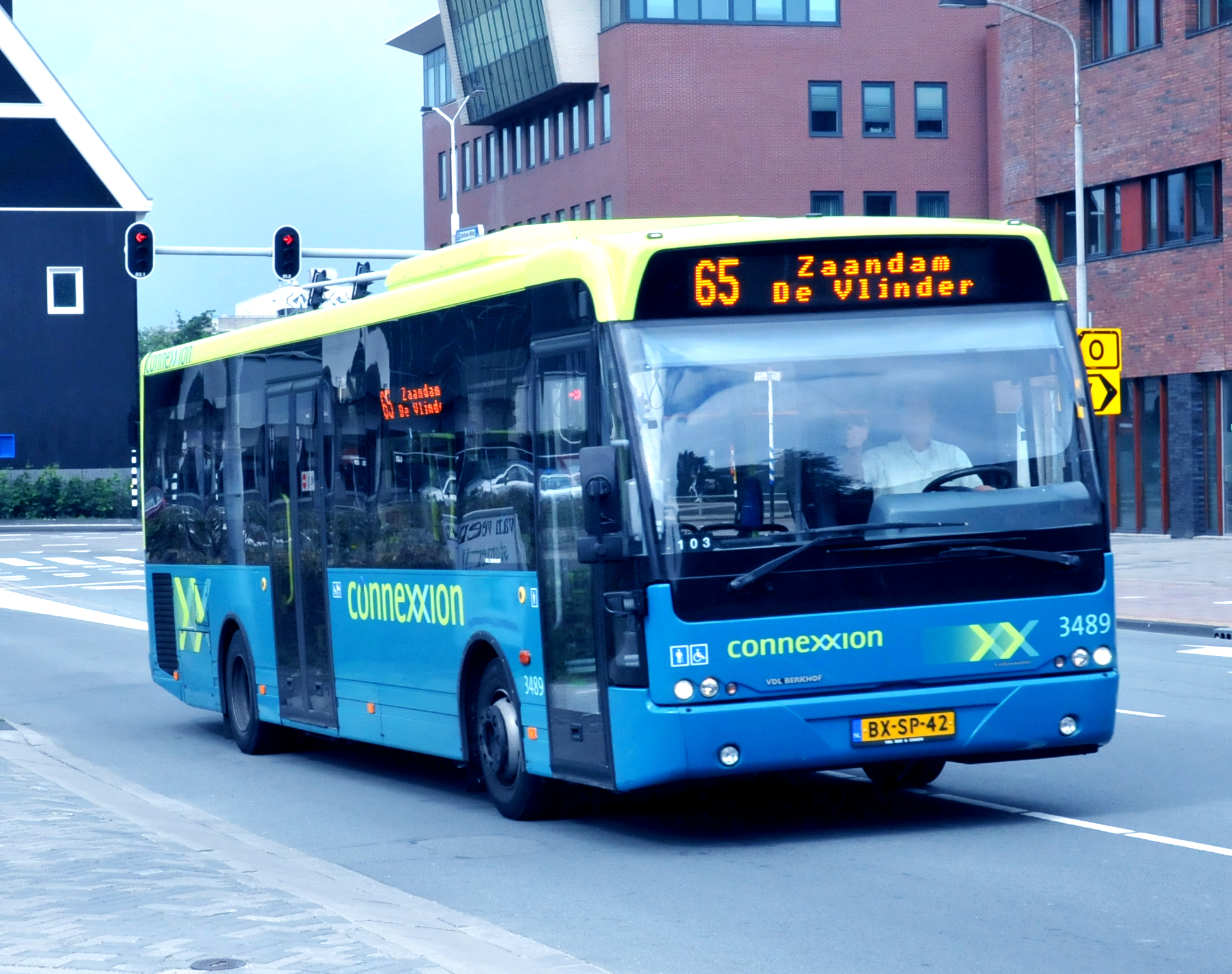
Connexxion ALE106 bus

Using knowledge and experience gained from the ALE120, VDL designed a 10-meter midibus which is designated Ambassador Low Entry 106 (ALE 106) (bus length 106 dm, or 10.6 m). These buses are primarily used in several cities in the Netherlands. The bus is built on a DAF/VDL SB120 chassis, which was also used for the Wright Cadet. In 2008, the DAF/VDL SB120 chassis was exchanged for a VDL SB180.

=== Ambassador 200 ===
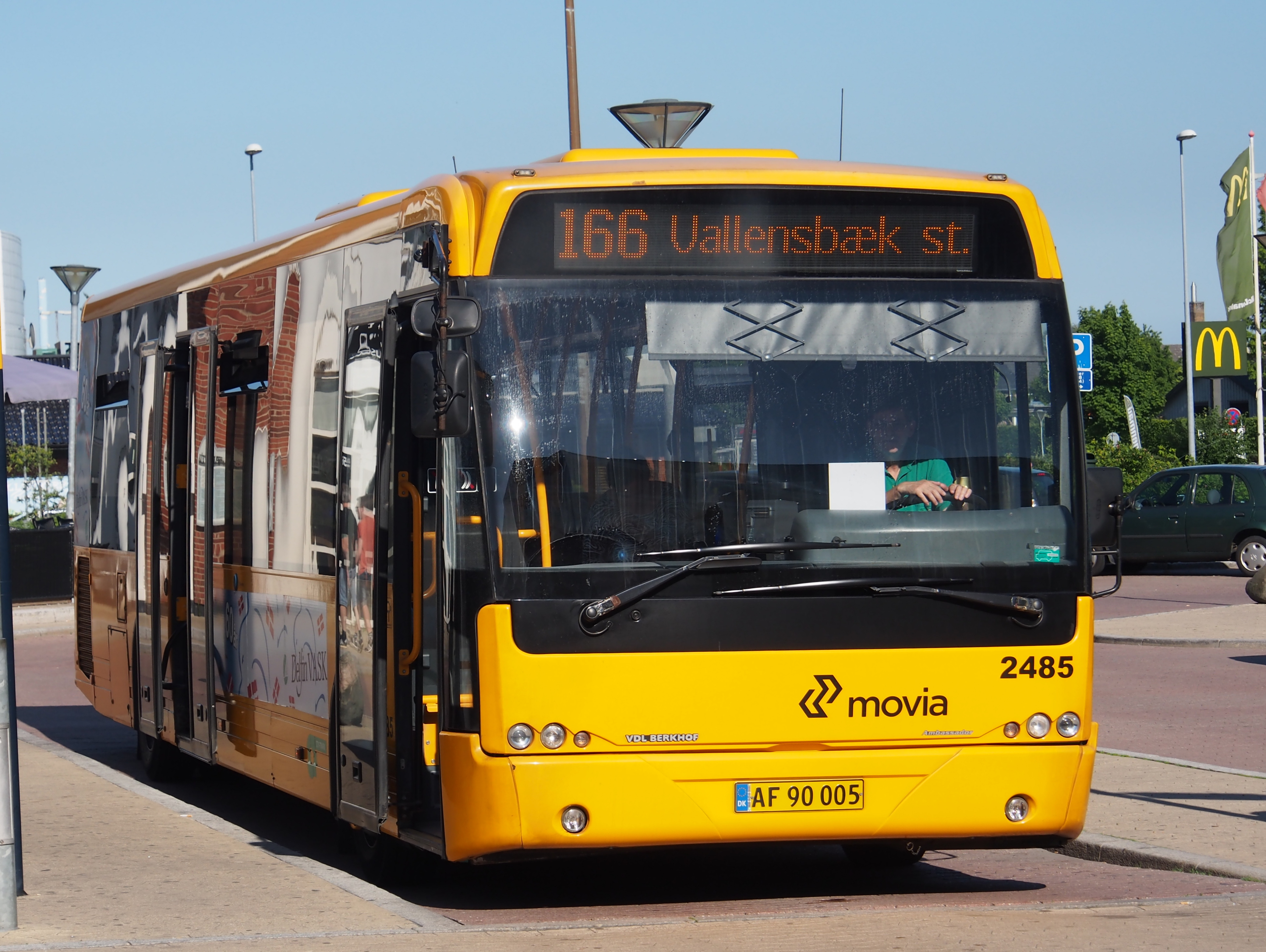
City-Trafik 2485 ALE120

The Ambassador 200 is a 12-meter-long lightweight bus made for local and long-distance transportation. Hundreds of buses from this type have been produced. It is designated as Ambassador Low Entry 120 (ALE 120) (the bus length is 120 dm, or 12 m). Its coachwork rests on a DAF/VDL SB200 chassis, which is also used for the Wright Commander from Wrightbus. The weight of the older buses differs from later models because of different materials and a different engine. Its interior varies by company. The passenger seats are made inexpensively; they are plastic cups with a layer of foam on the seat and fabric on top. Several buses have been equipped with more-luxurious seats.

== Overview ==
The following table shows the Ambassador 200 buses in service in the Netherlands and other countries:

Company	Amount	Series
Arriva Netherlands	323	Ex. Veolia: 0050–0051, 0053; Ex. Connexxion: 0207-0215; Ex. NoordNed: 6100–6109, 6171–6189, 8064-8069; Arriva: 3154, 3158, 3159, 8001–8069, 8201–8244, 8301–8382, 8401–8451, 8651–8670, 8851-8860
Arriva Danmark	19	1058–1060, 1302–1303, 1761–1762, 3040–3047, 3056–3057, 5640-5641
Veolia Transport Netherlands	393	Ex. BBA: 901–902, 5050–5057, Veolia: 5001–5049, 5058–5242, 5243–5342, 5343–5363, 5364, 5365–5367, 5368-5391 (5319,5320,5321 and 5367 are sold to "Zwaluw reizen")
Keolis Danmark	49	224–228, 2310–2314, 2431–2437, 2481–2499, 8515-8528 Ex. City-Trafik: 2431–2436, 2481-2498 Ex. Nettbuss: 224–228, 2499, 8515-8528 Ex. De Hvide Busser: 2437 (De Hvide Busser 8725) Ex. Umove: 2310-2314 (De Hvide Busser/Umove 8720, 8715, 8727, 8729 & 8731)
Connexxion Netherlands	1110 + 12 Ambassador 120	Ex. Hermes: 1734–1747, 1756–1760, 1761–1771, 1773–1776, 1777–1787, 1790–1791, 1811, 1815, 1828, 1836–1840, 1843, 1844, 1850-1860; Ex. Stadsvervoer Nederland: 5101-5131 (tot 01-01-2008 SVN-series 101–131); Connexxion: 4134–4229, 4230–4253, 4254–4277, 8100–8224, 8233–8254, 8278–8375, 8380–8728, 8792–8828, 8883-8976; Ambassador 120: 8226-8232 (Maassluis, Den Haag), 8225, 8376-8379 (urban transport Zaandam)
Nobina Danmark	11	6001-6011
DitoBus, Denmark	21	4656–4662, 4736-4749 Ex. Østrafik: 4746-4749 (Østrafik 7603–7606)
Hermes, Netherlands	196	1734–1793, 1801–1860, 3330–3404, 3479-3483
De Hvide Busser, Denmark	18	8715-8732 Sold to City-Trafik in 2014: 8725 (City-Trafik number 2437) Sold to Keolis in 2016: 8720, 8715, 8727, 8729 & 8731 (Keolis number 2310-2314) Stayed at Umove but got a new number: 8732 De Hvide Busser was sold to Umove in 2013 and the entire fleet followed over, in September 2015 De Hvide Busser changed name to Umove and in December 2015 the Ambassadors got replaced by brand new VDL Citea LLE
Umove, Denmark	1	7561 Ex. De Hvide Busser/Umove 8732
Besa Trans, Denmark	2	Ex. Kruse: 7122-7123
Kruse, Denmark	2	7124-7125
Millennium Transportation International	3	02–25, 02–26, 02-27 later as BBA InterHoMe 903–905, now Connexxion 3156-3157 and Snelle Vliet (Coaches) 204
Qbuzz	131	4401-4531
Syntus, Netherlands	243	2146–2148, 3046–3048, 3049–3060, 3248–3250, 3255–3256, 4001–4052, 4101–4146, 4150–4154, 5001–5024, 5101–5126, 5127–5152, 5301-5305
Taxi Centrale Renesse, Netherlands	14 Ambassador 120	419-432
Transportes Sul do Tejo, Portugal	37	
VBN / BVN, Germany	37	
CA.NOVA, Italy	12	CA.NOVA ex. Veolia, owned in 2011: from number 355 to number 366

A large number of buses have been exported to Denmark, Germany, Egged in Israel, Portugal and Sweden.

== Gallery ==
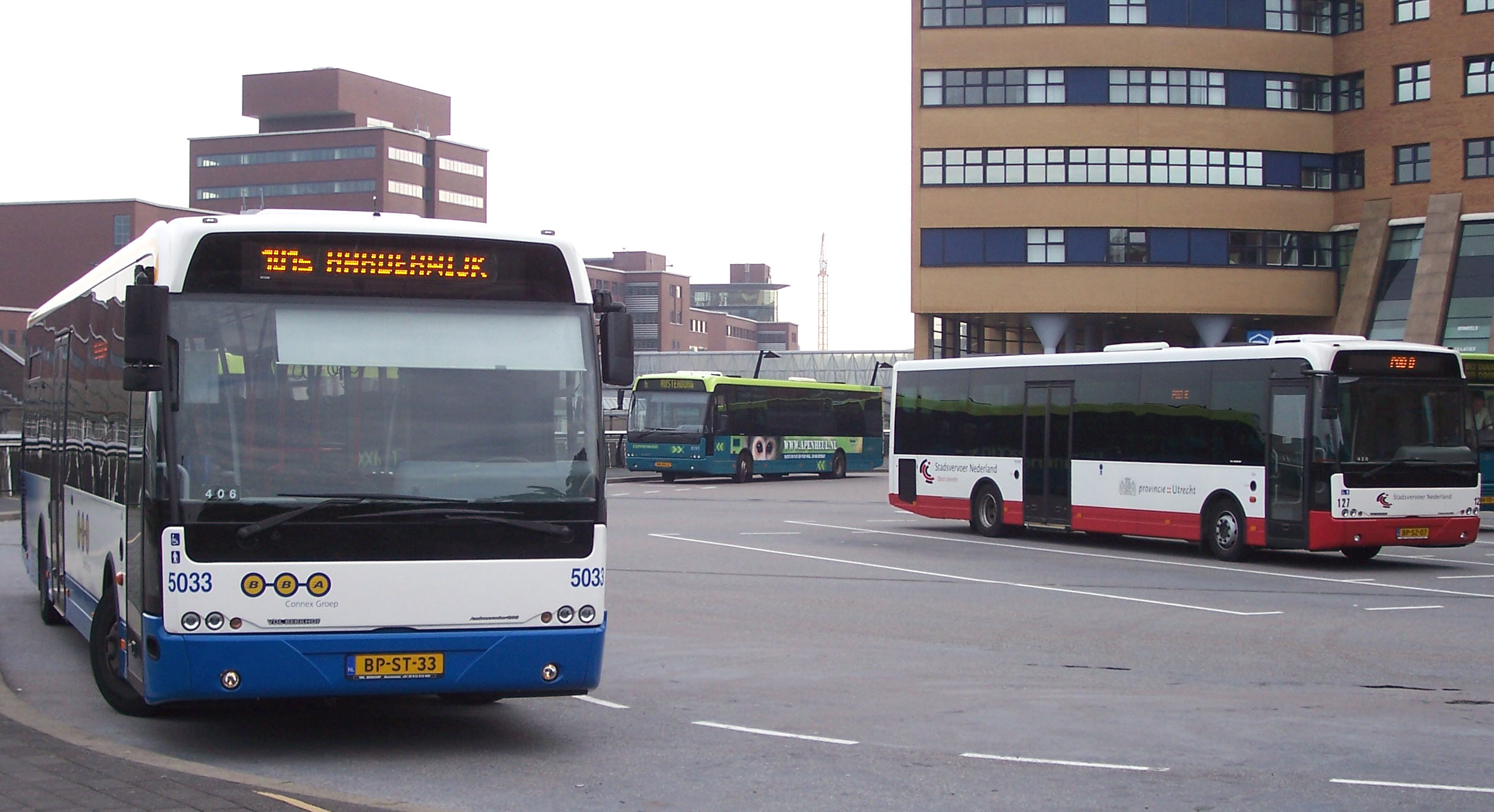
Three different Ambassador colours: BBA, Connexxion and Stadsvervoer Nederland

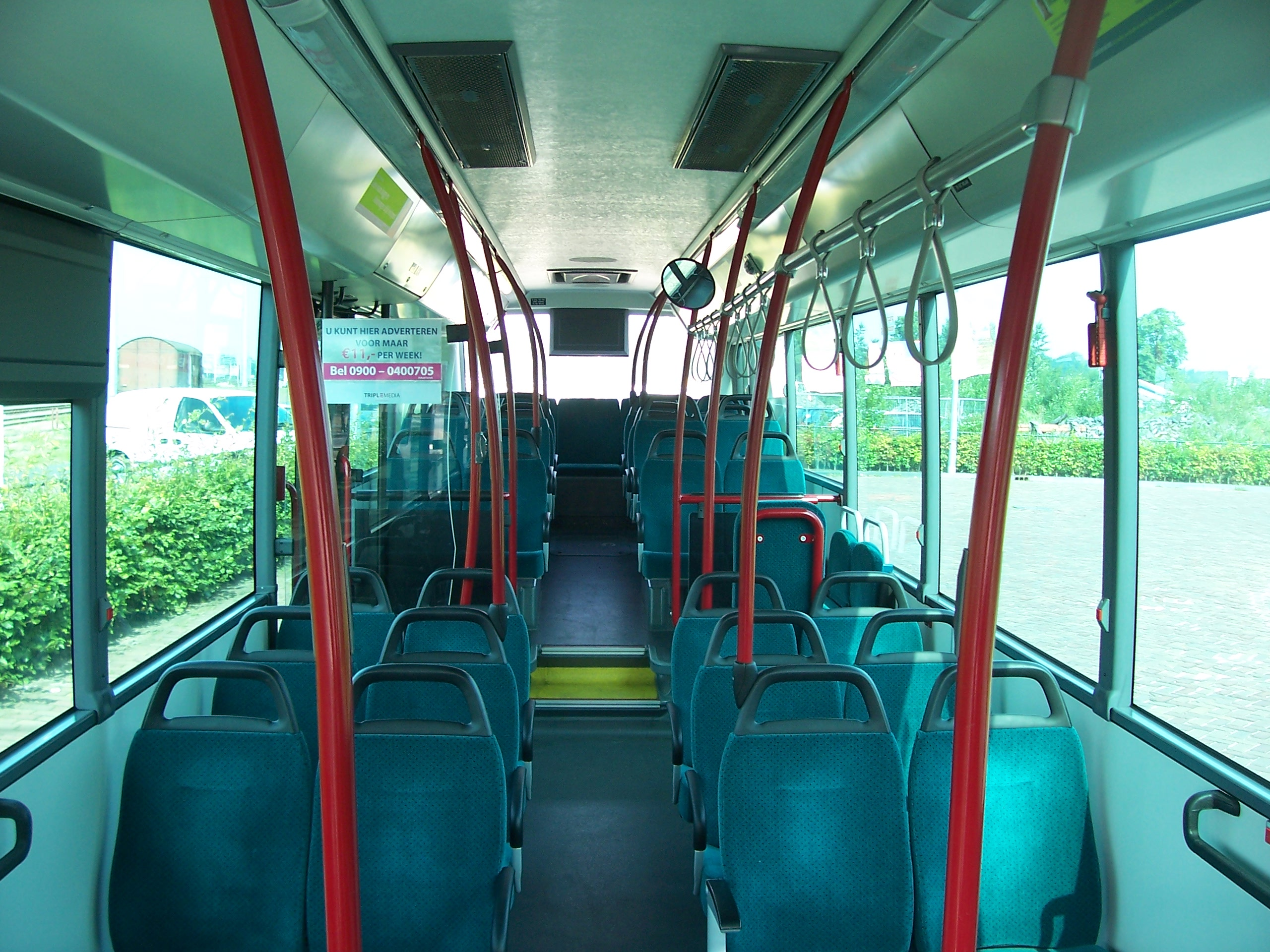
Interior of Ambassador 200

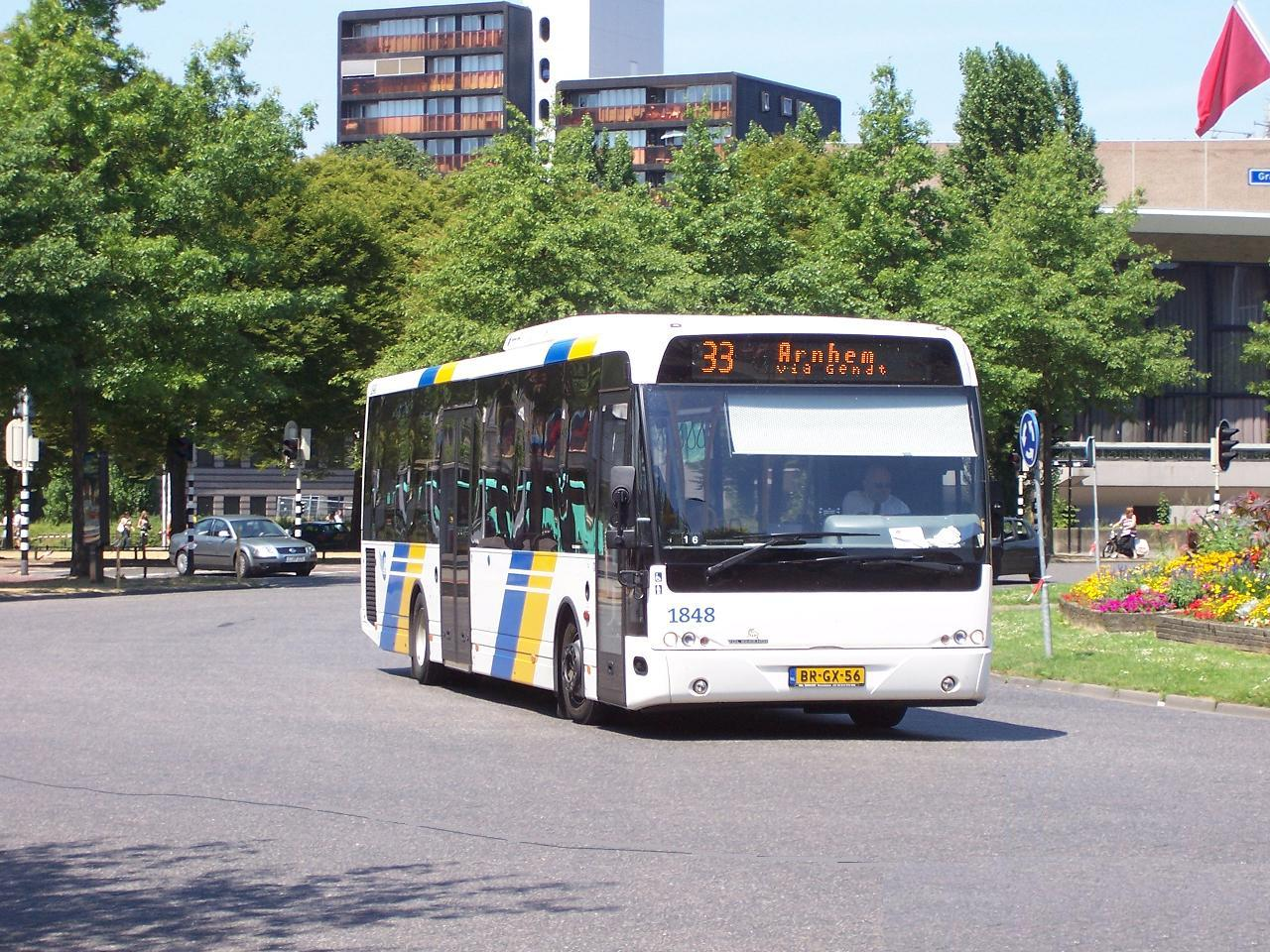
Ambassador 200 from Hermes

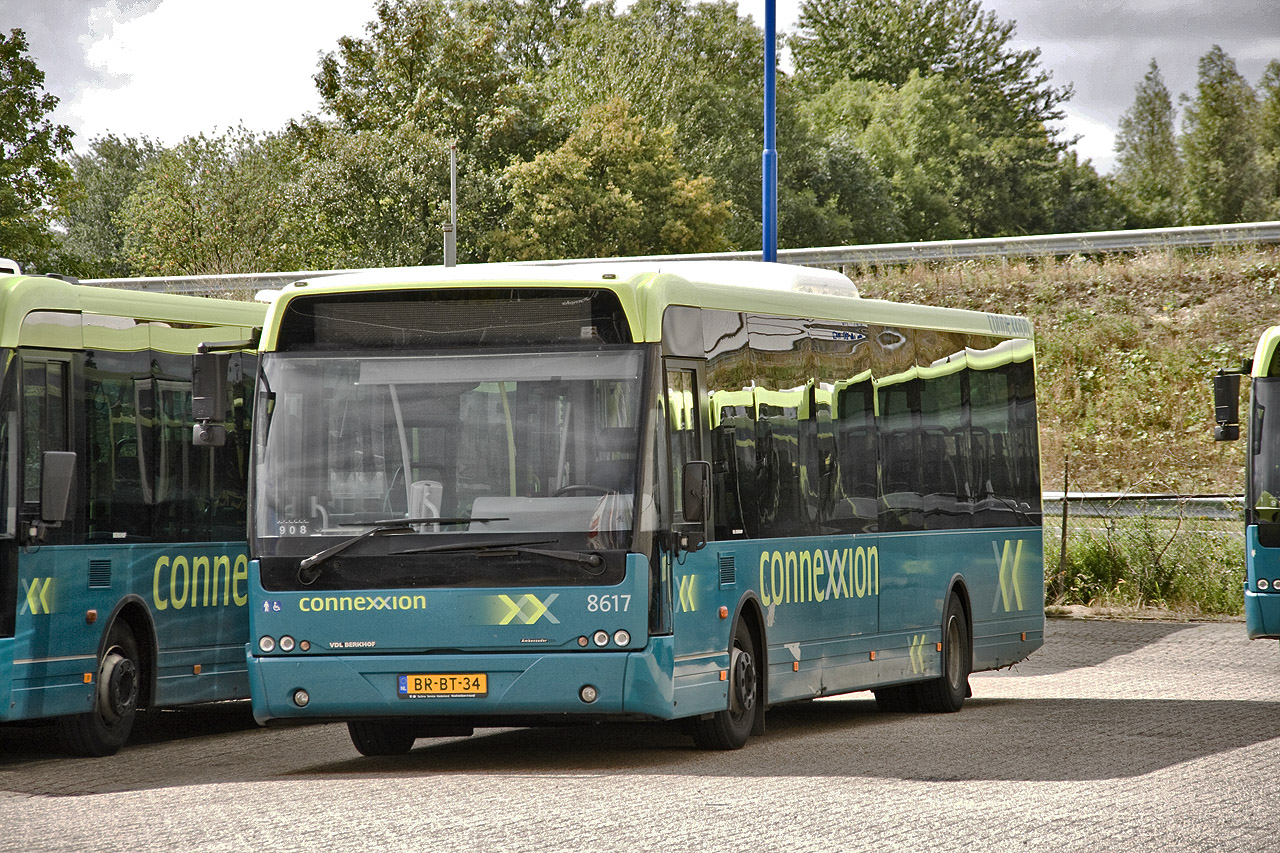
Ambassador 200 from Connexxion

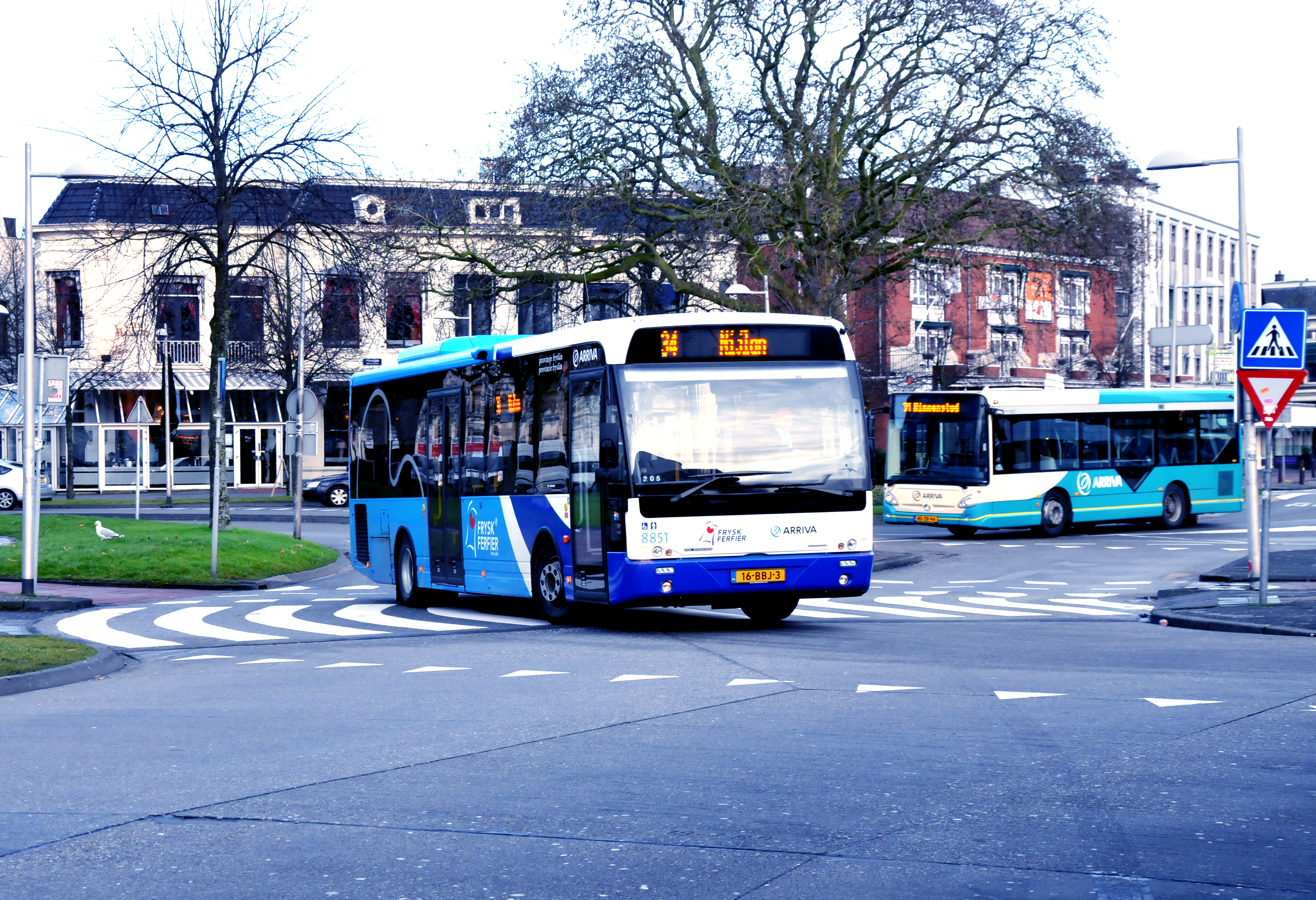
Ambassador 120 from Arriva

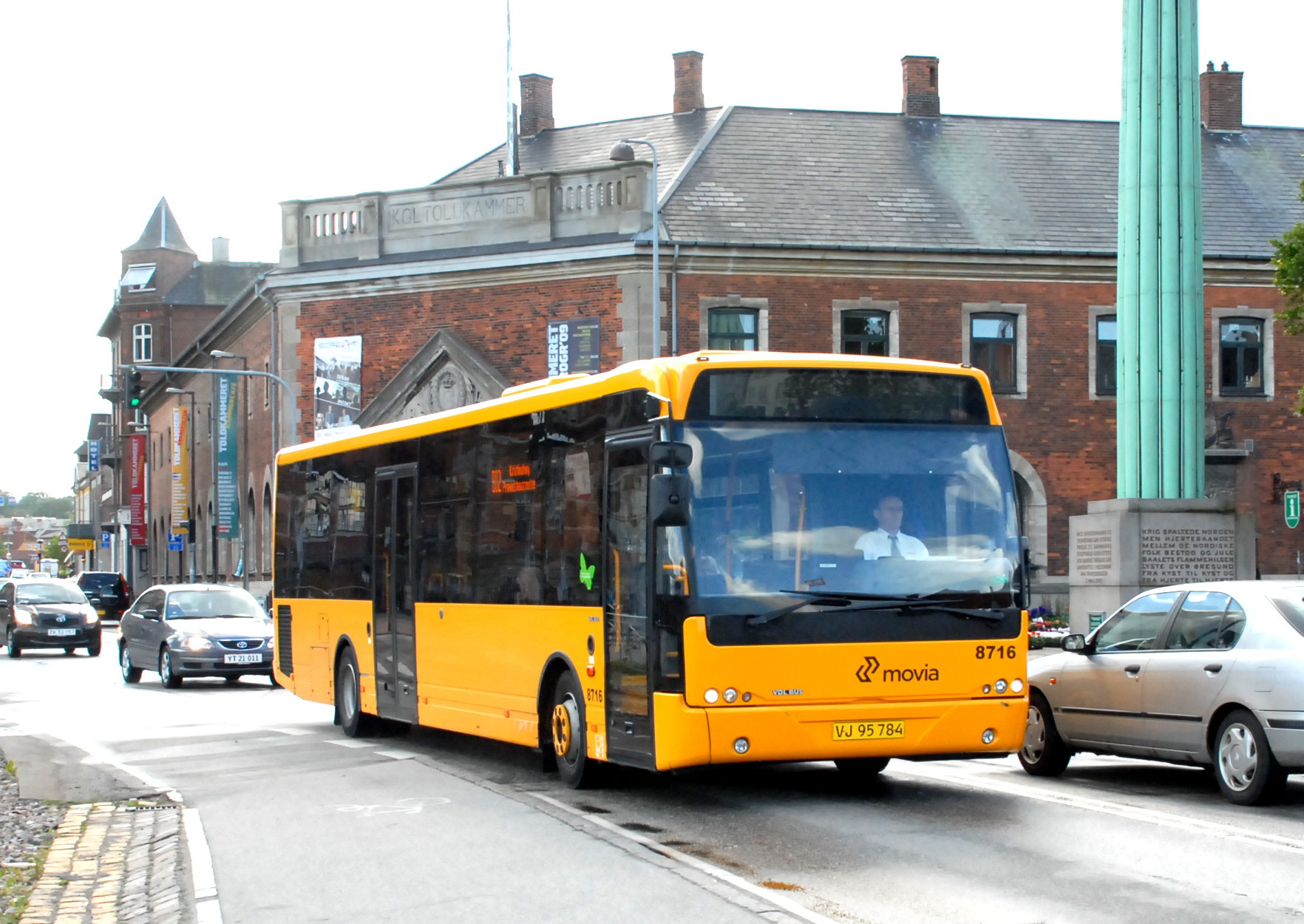
De Hvide Busser 8716 Ambassador 200

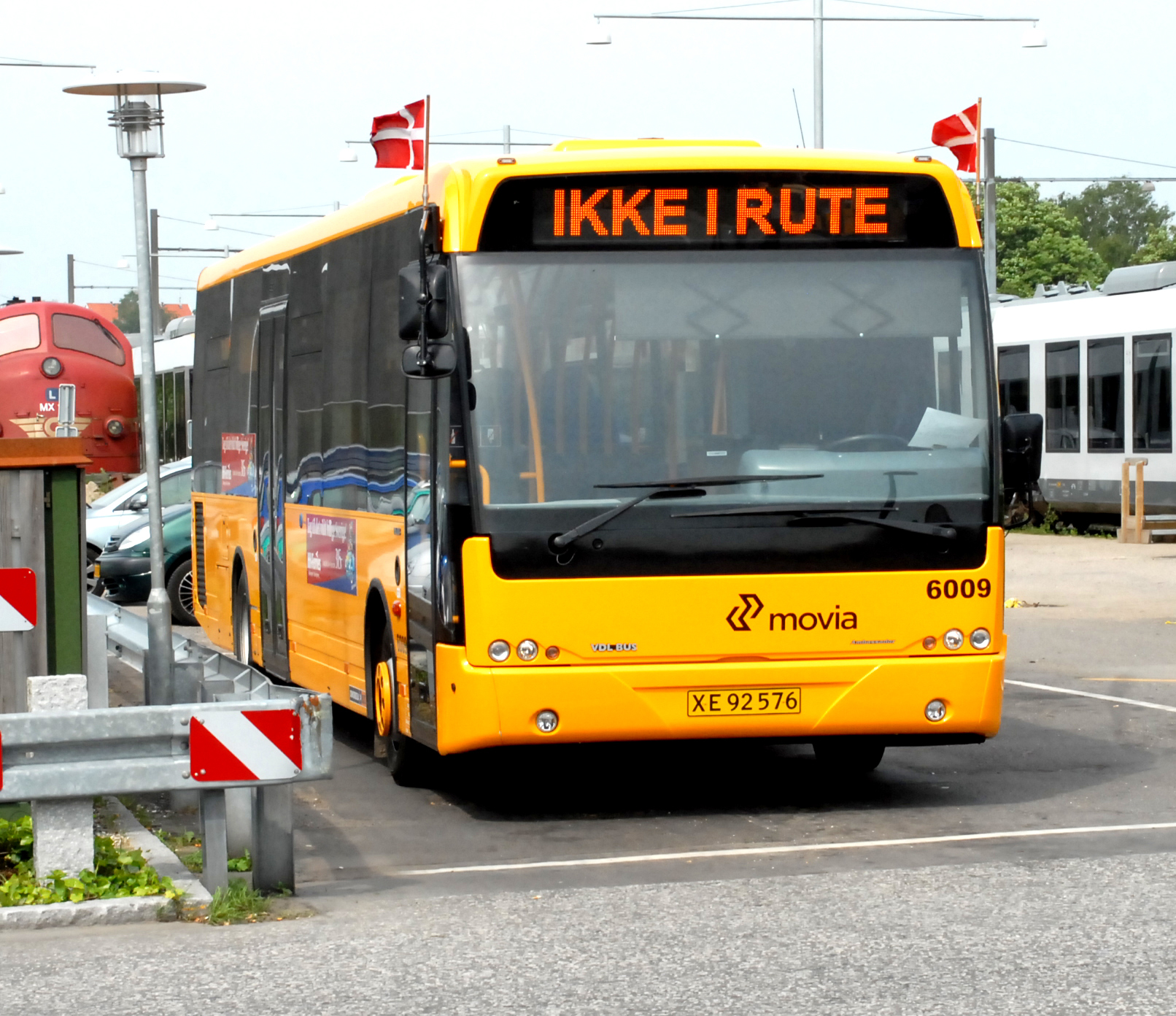
Nobina 6009 Ambassador 200

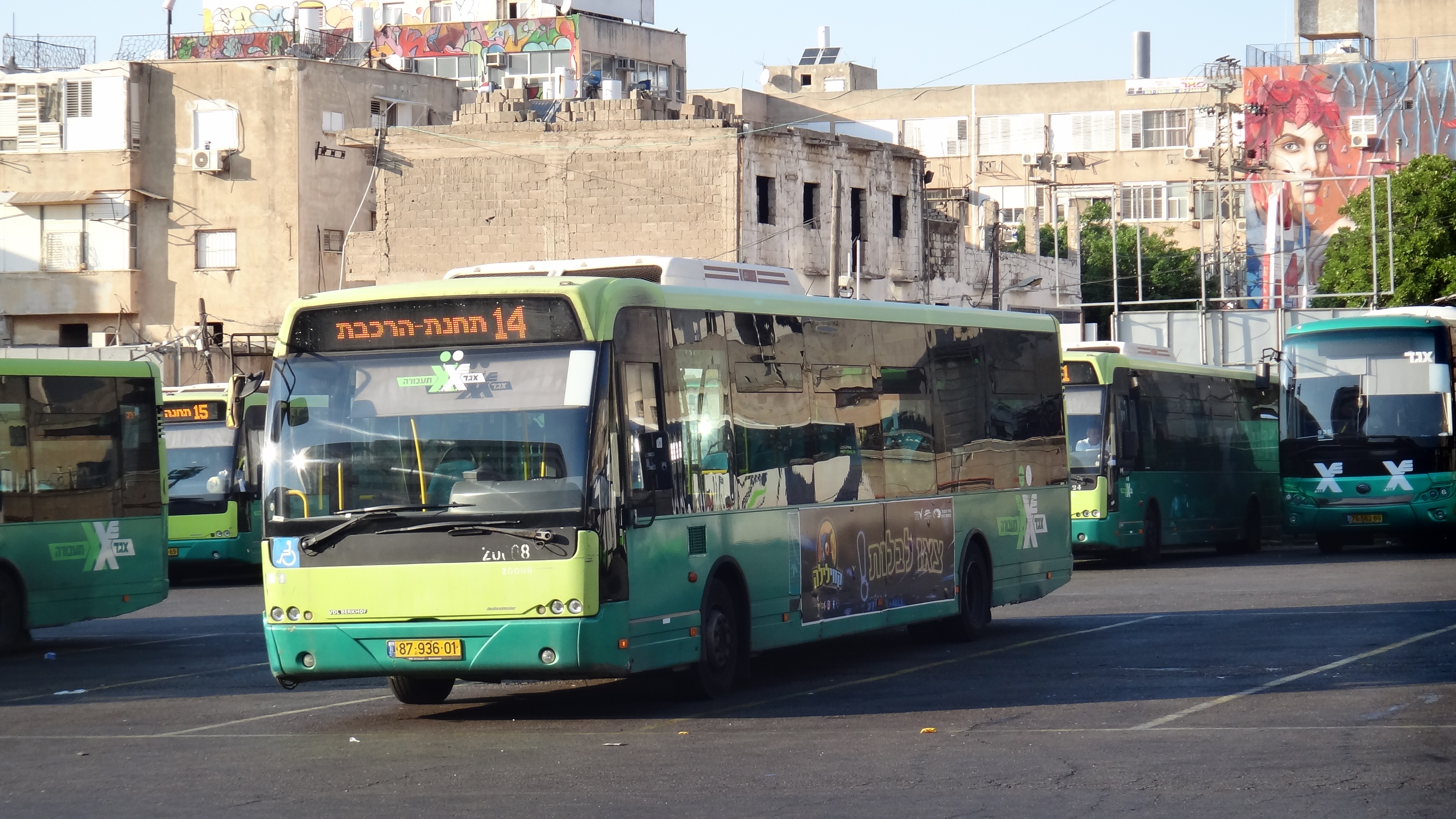
Ambassador 200 from Egged Ta'avura in Israel

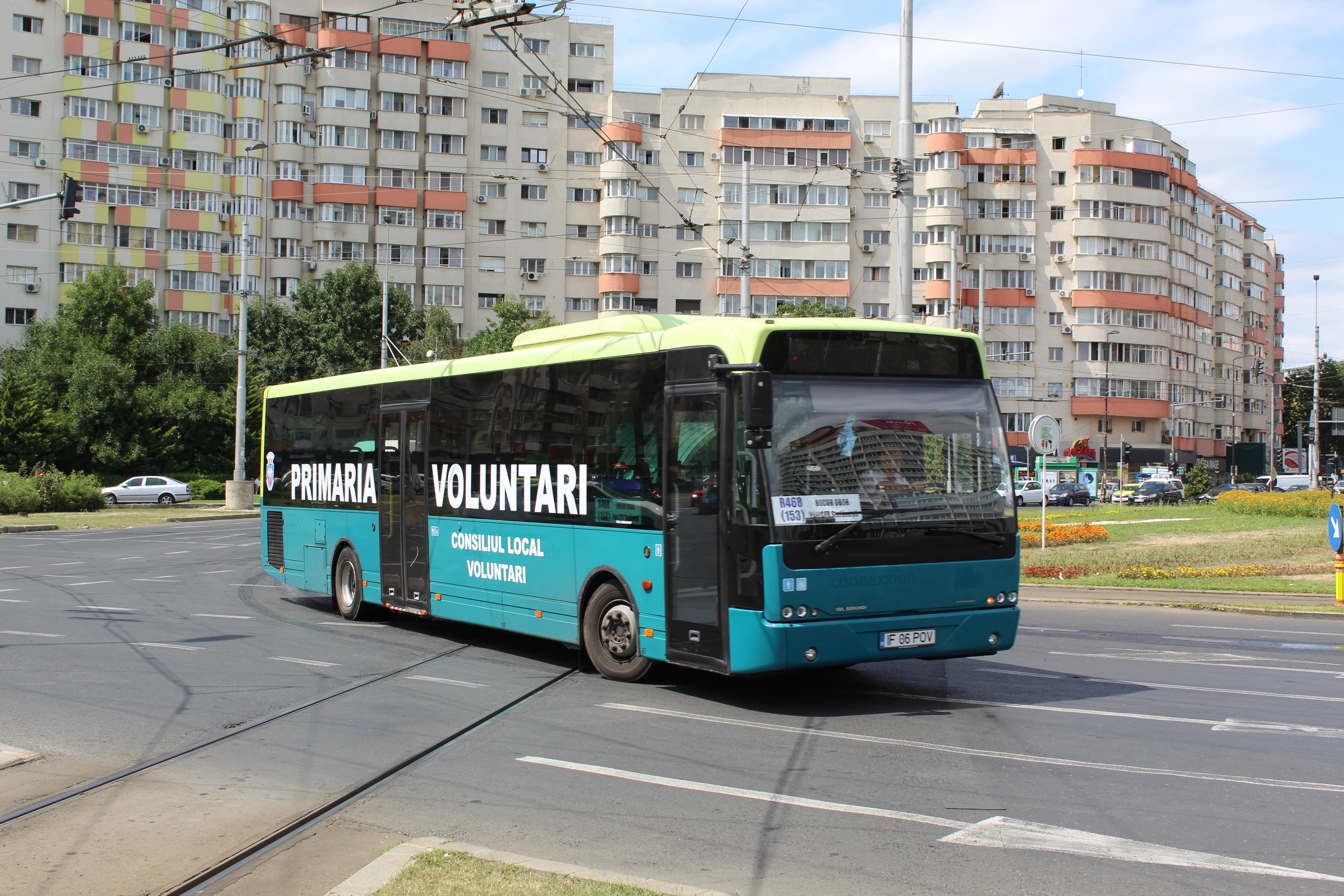
Ambassador 200 of the Voluntari Town Hall, used for interurban services in Bucharest, Romania

== See also ==
- List of buses
