= Wright Pulsar =

Low-floor bus body on VDL chassis

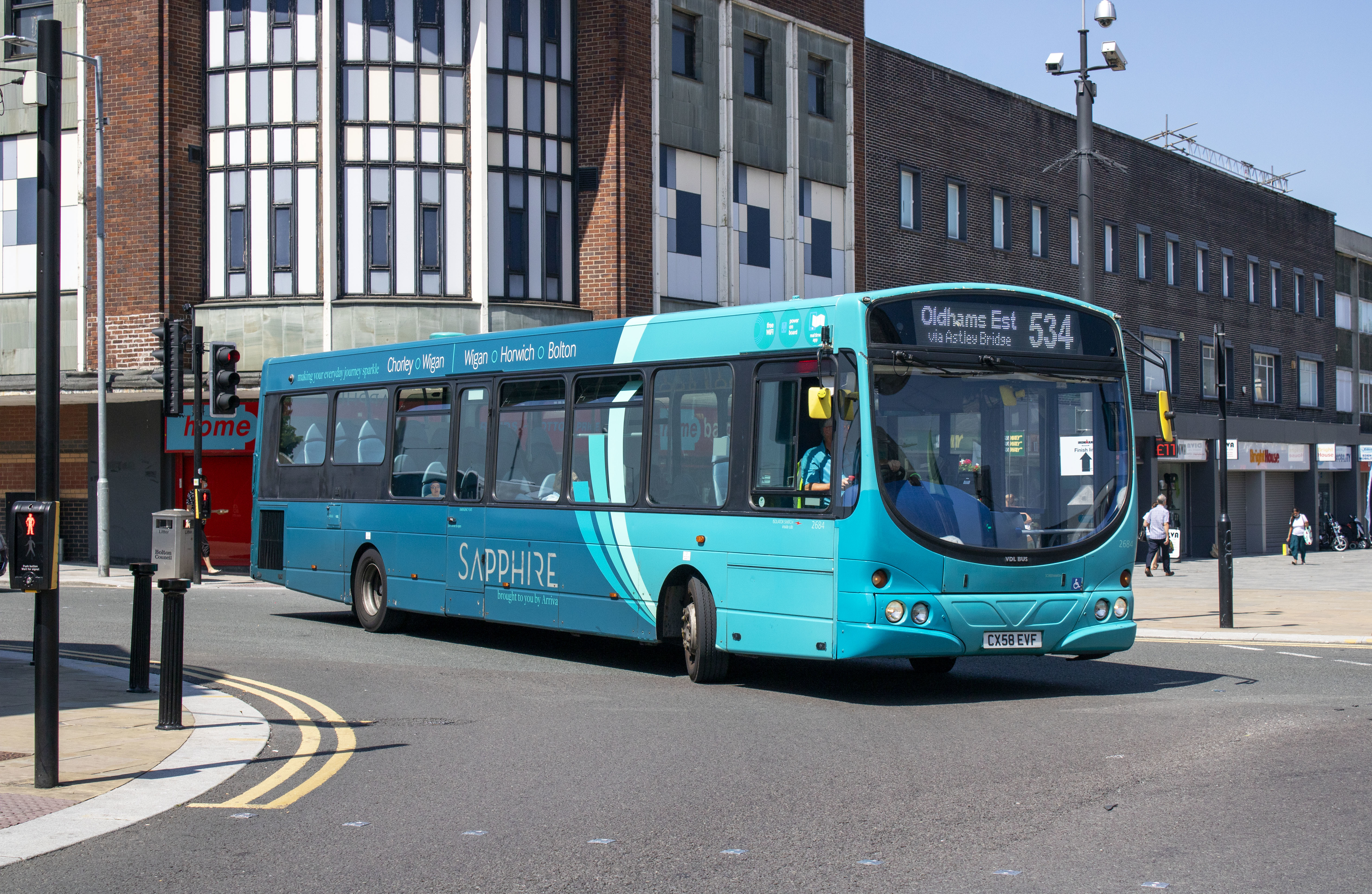
- Arriva North West Wright Pulsar bodied VDL SB200 in Bolton in May 2013

Overview
- Manufacturer: Wrightbus
- Production: 2006 - 2014
- Assembly: Ballymena, Northern Ireland

Body and chassis
- Doors: 1 or 2
- Floor type: Low floor Low entry
- Chassis: VDL SB200
- Related: Wright Pulsar Gemini

Powertrain
- Engine: Cummins ISBe; Hydrogen fuel cell

Dimensions
- Length: 11.90 metres
- Width: 2.50 metres
- Height: 3.00 metres

Chronology
- Predecessor: Wright Commander

The Wright Pulsar, a single-decker body on the VDL SB200 chassis, was built by Wrightbus between 2006 and 2014.

A total of 639 Pulsars were built. Arriva was the main customer, with large numbers entering service at its Kent Thameside, North West, Midlands, North East, and Yorkshire divisions. First London purchased eight hydrogen-powered Pulsars. Additionally a number of independent operators also purchased Pulsars. A double-decker version of the Pulsar was also produced as the Pulsar Gemini.

== First generation (2006–2013) ==
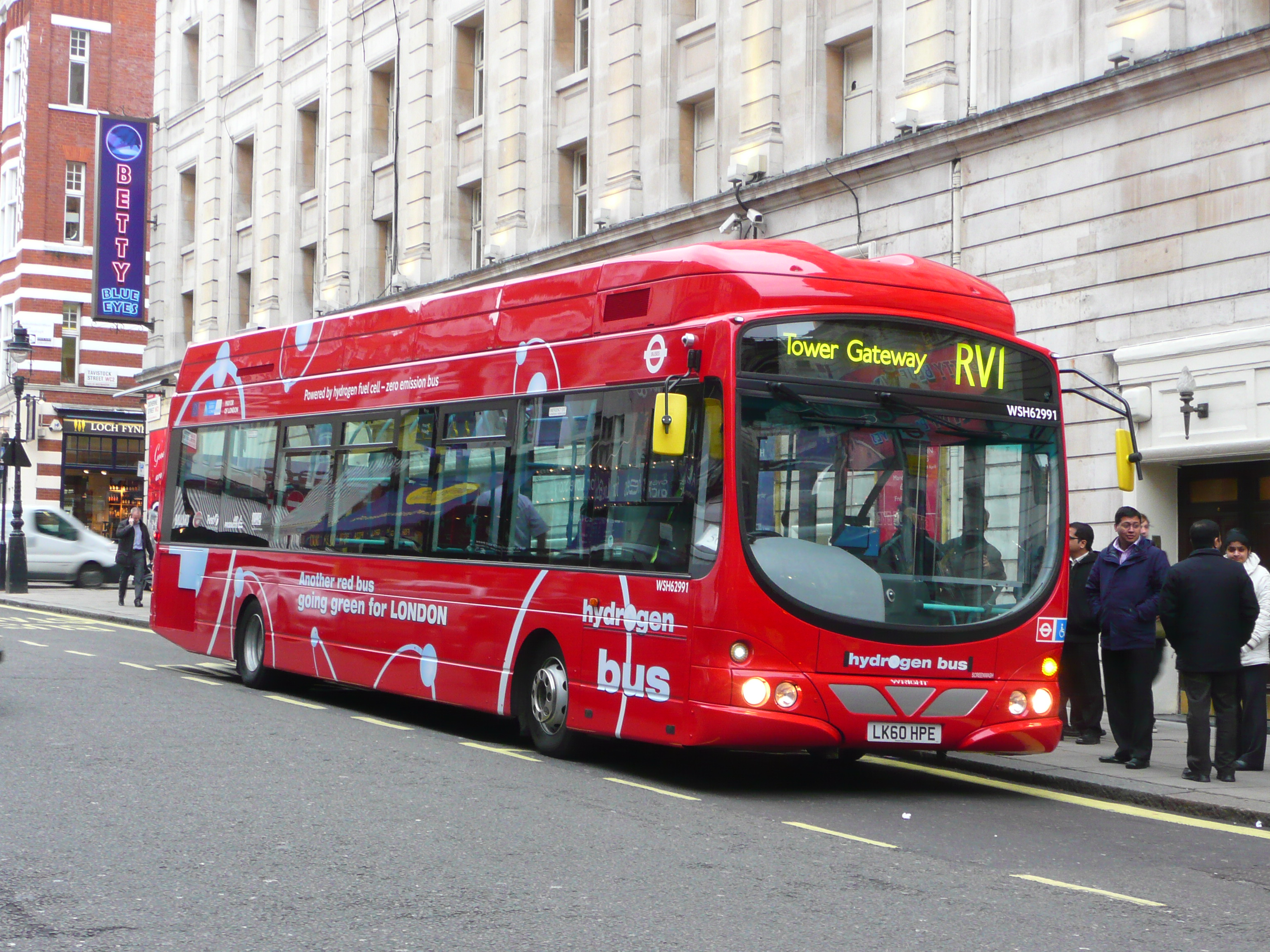
First London Wright Pulsar bodied VDL SB200 with hydrogen-power

The Pulsar was launched at the 2006 Euro Bus Expo as the replacement for the Commander. It was also intended to replace the VDL SB120 based Cadet midibus; however, no shorter Pulsars were built. Of the 114 produced, all bar eight entered service with Arriva; 13 of these were delivered to Arriva North West in 2008 for services in Bolton, and five were delivered to Arriva Midlands in 2007 for use on services running to and from Cannock Chase Hospital.

First London purchased eight hydrogen-powered Pulsar bodied VDL SB200s for use on route RV1 between 2010 and 2013. The hydrogen fuel pods are fitted to the whole length of the roof on top of the buses.

== Second generation (2009–2014) ==
The second generation Pulsar, known as the Pulsar 2, was launched in 2009. The Pulsar 2 features facelifted front and rear ends to match the new Eclipse 2.

The first examples were delivered to Arriva's North East and North West divisions in 2009. Of the 525 produced, Arriva purchased 462. The final two Pulsar 2s were delivered to Claribels Coaches of Birmingham in April 2014.

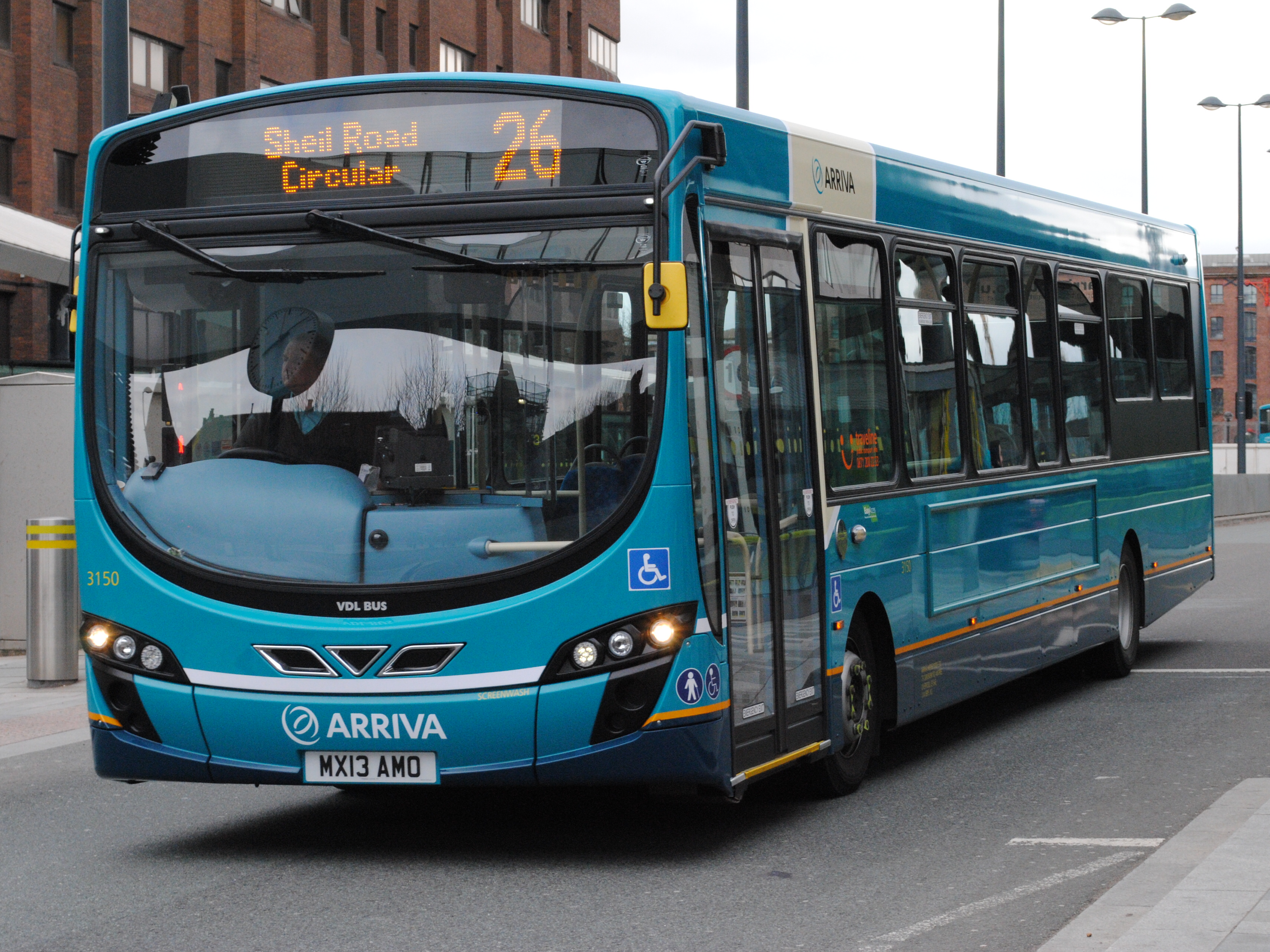
Arriva North West Wright Pulsar 2 in Liverpool in April 2013

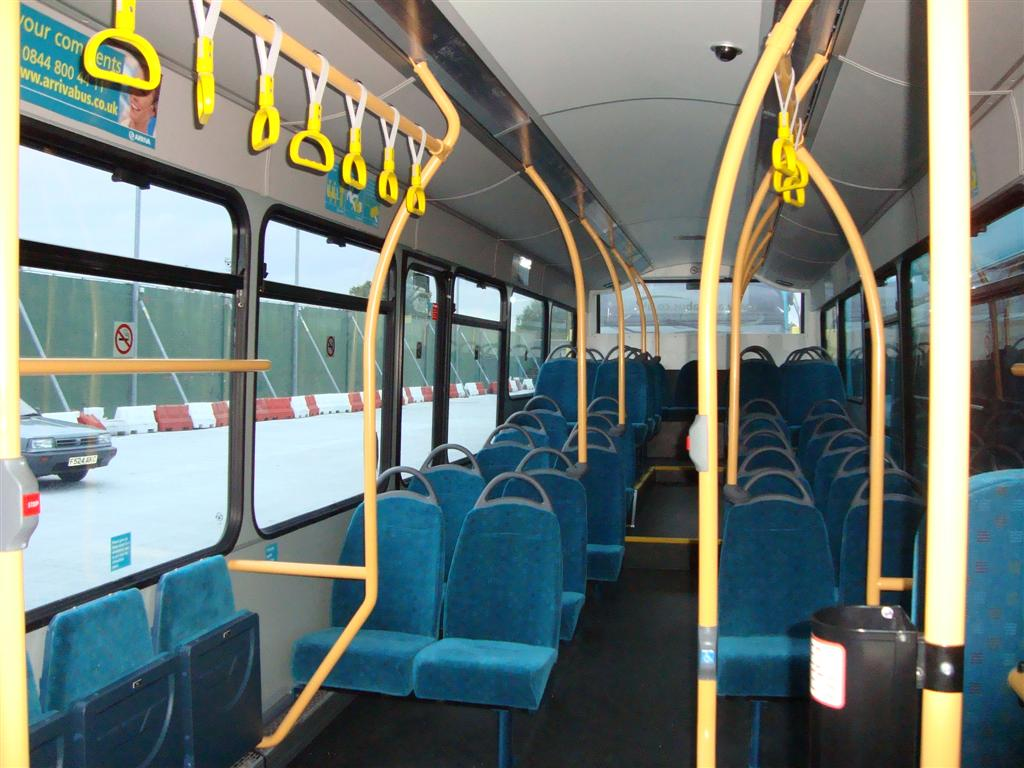
Arriva Southern Counties Wright Pulsar 2 interior at Covent Garden in January 2011
