= VDL SB250 =

DAF/VDL SB250
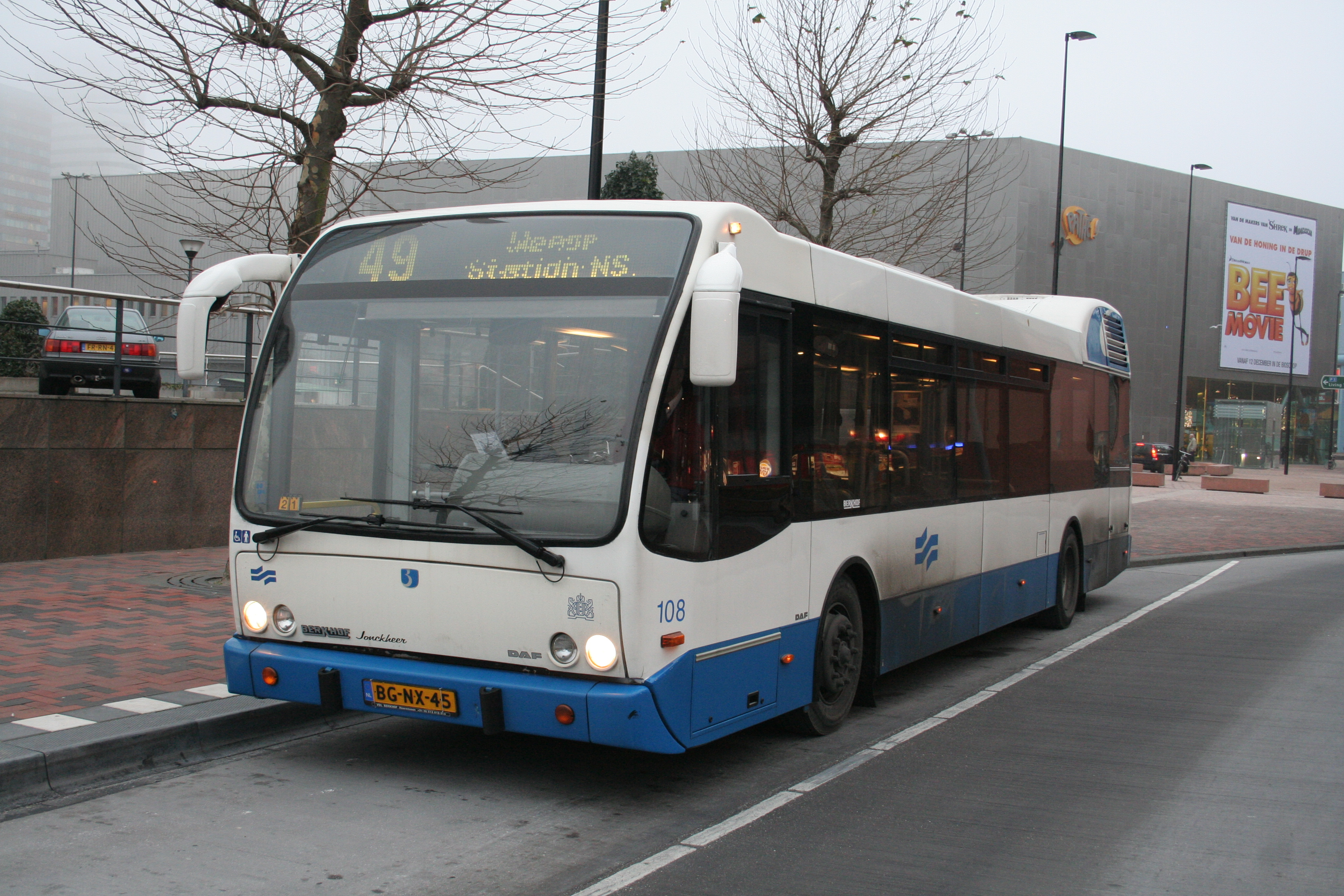
- Jonckheere bodied DAF SB250 in Amsterdam in December 2007

Overview
- Manufacturer: DAF / VDL
- Production: 1997 only
- Assembly: Eindhoven, Netherlands

Body and chassis
- Doors: 2/3
- Floor type: Low floor

The VDL SB250 (originally the DAF SB250) was a full-size low-floor single-decker bus launched in 1997, which was designed specifically for Continental Europe market by DAF.

The SB250 chassis could be fitted with bodywork supplied by fellow VDL Bus & Coach subsidiaries VDL Berkhof, Valkenswaard or Jonckheere), etc.

Like its competitor, the Volvo B7L, the engine was mounted at the left side of the rear overhang (thus the rear door can be located as rearward as possible), but the radiator was mounted on the roof.

A revised version of SB250 was launched in 2004 as the SB250+. The design has received a number of modifications, including the use of the independent front suspension.
