= London Buses route RV1 =

Former London bus route

RV1
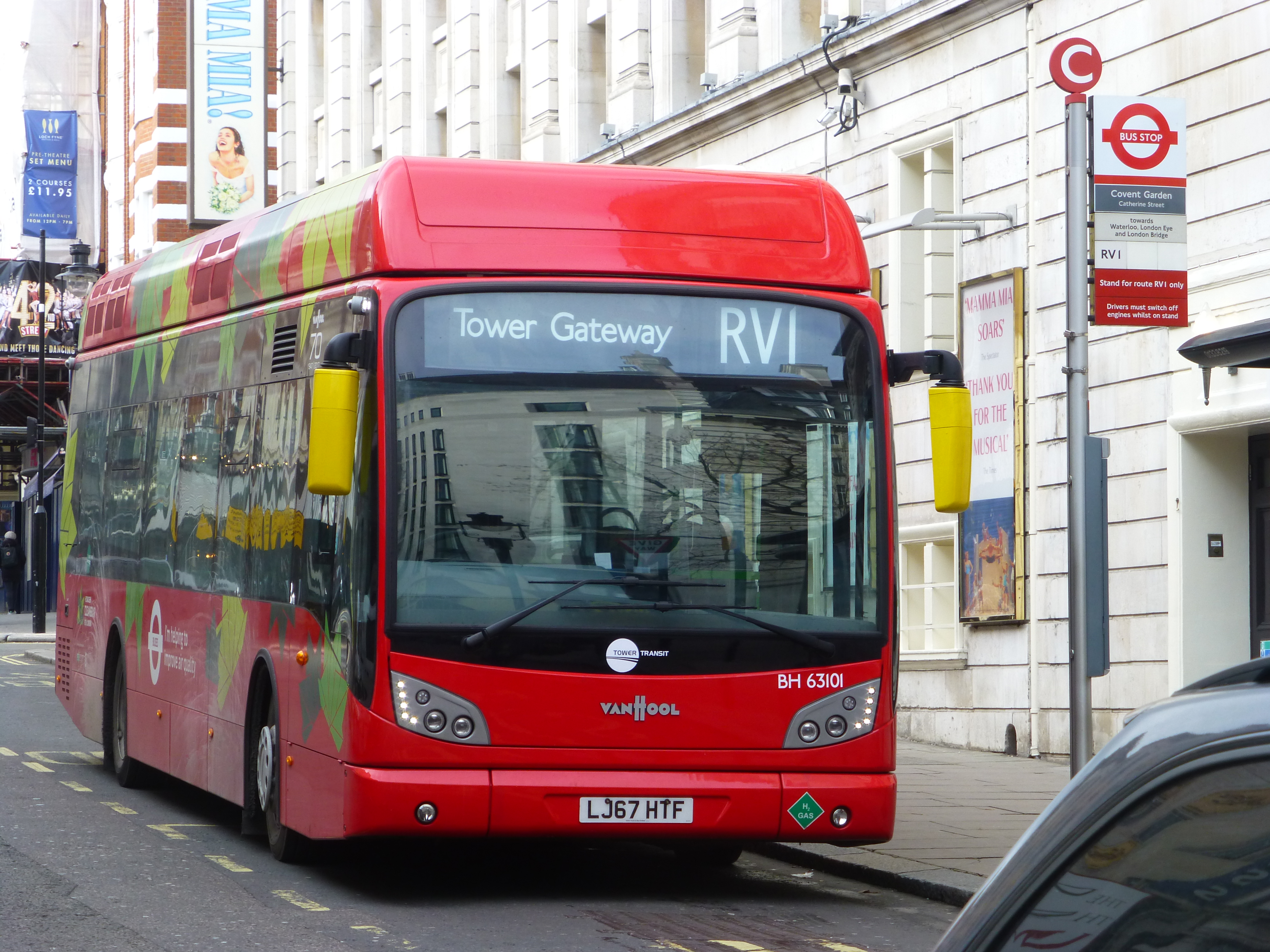
- Tower Transit Hydrogen Fuel Cell powered Van Hool A330FC in Covent Garden in February 2018

Overview
- Operator: Tower Transit
- Garage: Lea Interchange
- Vehicle: VDL SB200 Wright Pulsar 2 Hydrogen-powered; Van Hool A330FC Hydrogen Fuel Cell
- Peak vehicle requirement: 6
- Status: Defunct
- Began service: 27 April 2002
- Ended service: 15 June 2019
- Night-time: No night service

Route
- Start: Covent Garden
- Via: Waterloo; National Theatre; London Eye; Royal Festival Hall; Oxo Tower; Tate Modern; London Bridge; Tower Bridge
- End: Tower Gateway station
- Length: 6 miles (9.7 km)

Service
- Level: Daily

London Buses route RV1 was a Transport for London contracted bus route in London, England. It ran between Covent Garden and Tower Gateway station, and was last operated by Tower Transit.

== History ==
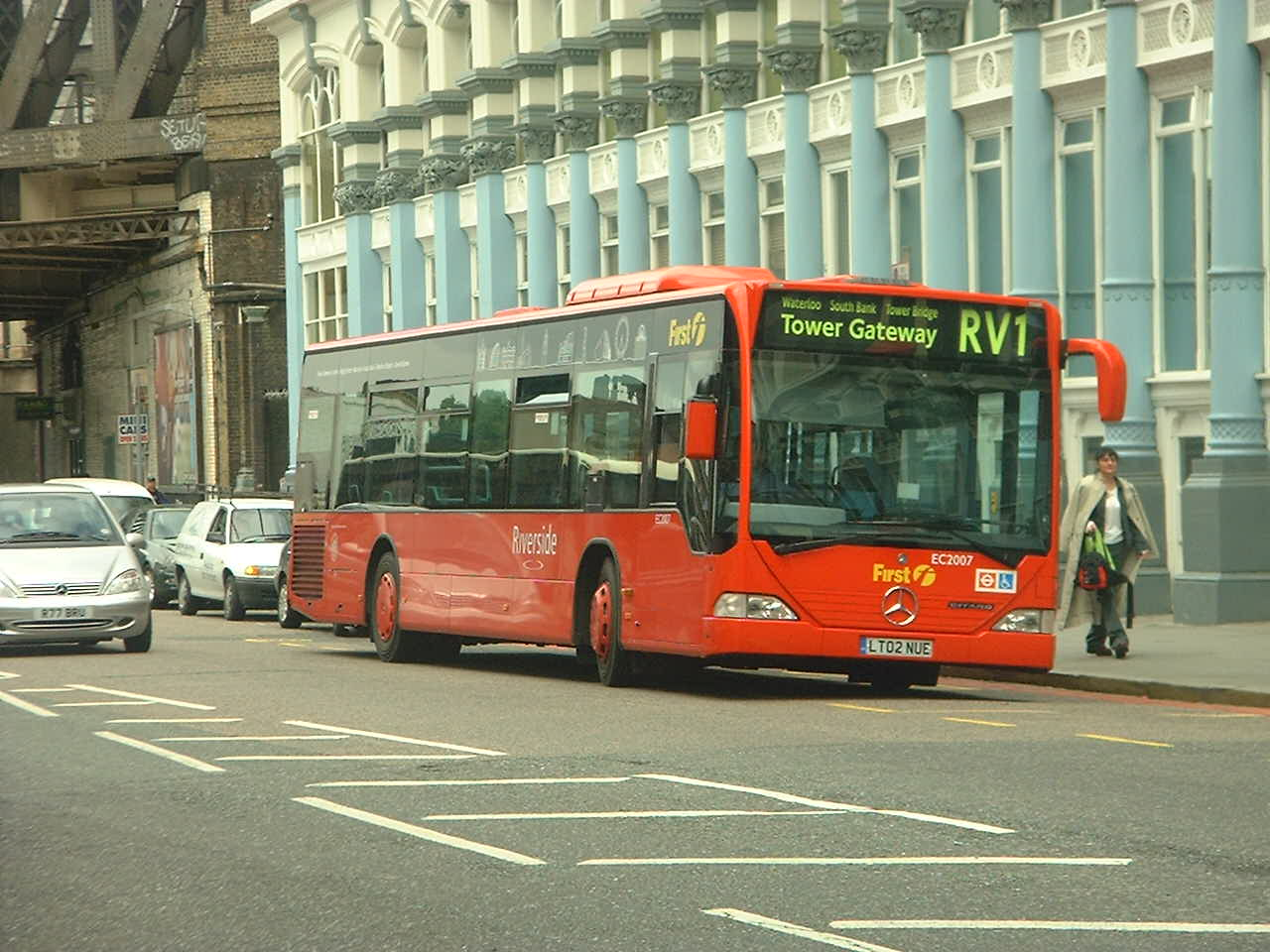
First London Mercedes-Benz Citaro in July 2002

Route RV1 commenced operating on 27 April 2002 between Covent Garden and Tower Gateway station. The service carried Riverside branding and was intended to open up the South Bank, connecting visitor attractions including the National Theatre, London Eye, Royal Festival Hall and Tate Modern. It served many streets that had, previously, not been served by buses.

The service was jointly promoted by Transport for London and the South Bank Employers' Group. The Daily Telegraph called the route one of the "best routes for sightseeing on a shoestring".

It was one of the first routes in London to use off-bus ticketing only, leading to quicker boarding and journey times, and unusually operated at the same frequency on Sundays as on other days of the week.

The route used to be operated by diesel fuelled Mercedes-Benz Citaros. Between September 2004 and January 2007, three trial fuel cell powered Mercedes-Benz Citaros were used on this route to compare their efficiency with their diesel equivalents. The fuel cell buses only operated in the mornings and early afternoon due to a lack of fuel capacity.

In November 2010, it was announced that the route would again be operated with hydrogen-powered vehicles. One new bus came into service in December 2010, and seven more were in service by the end of 2011.

On 22 June 2013, route RV1 was included in the sale of First London's Lea Interchange garage to Tower Transit. In August 2014, WiFi technology was introduced on one bus on route RV1. New passenger information screens were also introduced on one bus on the route.

In 2018, two Van Hool A330FC hydrogen fuel cell buses entered service on the route.

Following declining usage and a frequency cut in February 2018, it was proposed by Transport for London that the route be withdrawn. Although Southwark Council and local residents protested against the withdrawal of the route, the route was withdrawn on 15 June 2019 and partly replaced by route 343.

== Former route ==
Route RV1 operated via these primary locations:

- Covent Garden Catherine Street
- Aldwych
- Waterloo Bridge
- Waterloo station
- Royal Festival Hall
- Oxo Tower
- Southwark Street
- London Bridge station
- City Hall Tower Bridge
- Tower of London
- Tower Gateway station
