= VDL SB200 =

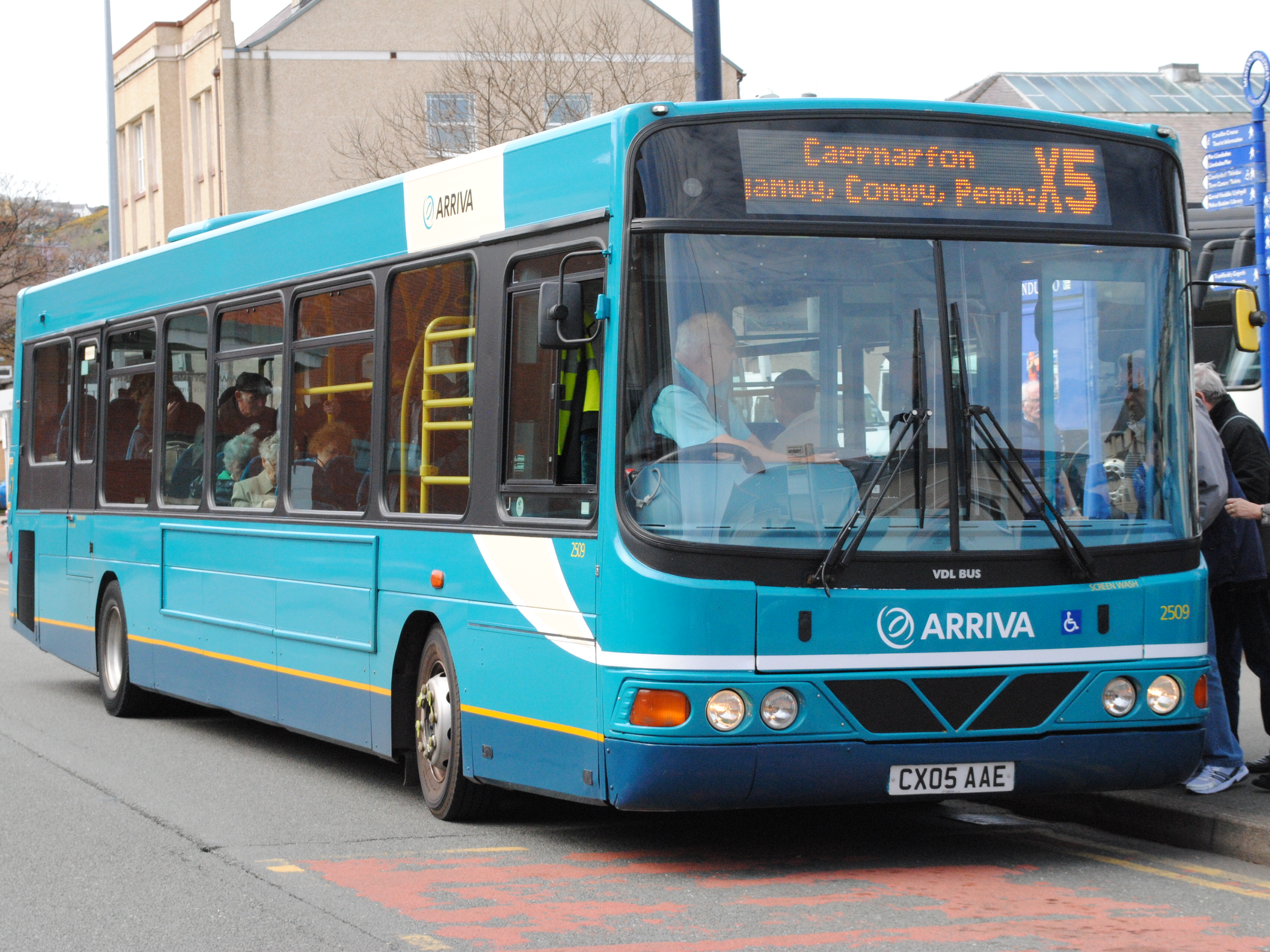
- Arriva Buses Wales Wright Commander bodied VDL SB200 in Llandudno in May 2013

Overview
- Manufacturer: DAF / VDL
- Production: Eindhoven, Netherlands
- Assembly: 2001 - 2014 (LHD), 2001 - present (RHD)

Body and chassis
- Doors: 1-2
- Floor type: Low floor
- Related: VDL SB120, VDL SB180

Powertrain
- Engine: Cummins ISBe Series 6.7L (Euro 4 - 6)
- Power output: 225hp/255hp
- Transmission: Voith DIWA.5/.5E/.6 (D854.5/D854.5E/D854.6) Auto 4-Speed , ZF Ecolife (6AP1000B) Auto 6-Speed

Dimensions
- Length: 12.0 m (39 ft 4 in)
- Width: 2.5 m (8 ft 2 in)
- Height: 3.0 m (9 ft 10 in)

Chronology
- Predecessor: DAF SB220

The VDL SB200 (originally the DAF SB200) is a 12 m (39 ft 4 in) light-weight, low floor single decker bus chassis that was produced from 2001 (to 2014 for the UK) by VDL Bus & Coach (formerly DAF Bus International). It superseded the SB220.

The SB200 sold very well in VDL's home market, the Netherlands mainly using VDL Berkhof type Ambassador and VDL Citea LLE bodywork. They were operated by all large transport companies in the Netherlands, Connexxion (including Hermes), Veolia Transport and Arriva. Arriva also used SB200s with Wright Commander bodywork.

Of the 831 built for United Kingdom operators, Arriva purchased 704, Tellings-Golden Miller 30 and John Fishwick & Sons 23.

Initially the SB200 built for the UK was only available with Wright Commander bodywork, but from 2006 it was available with the Plaxton Centro or Wright Pulsar bodywork, the latter being succeeded in late 2009 by the facelifted Wright Pulsar 2.

One VDL SB200 was fitted with an MCV Evolution body in 2012 as a static demonstrator for Arriva Bus & Coach, it was sold in 2014 to Richards Brothers in Wales.
