= VDL SB120 =

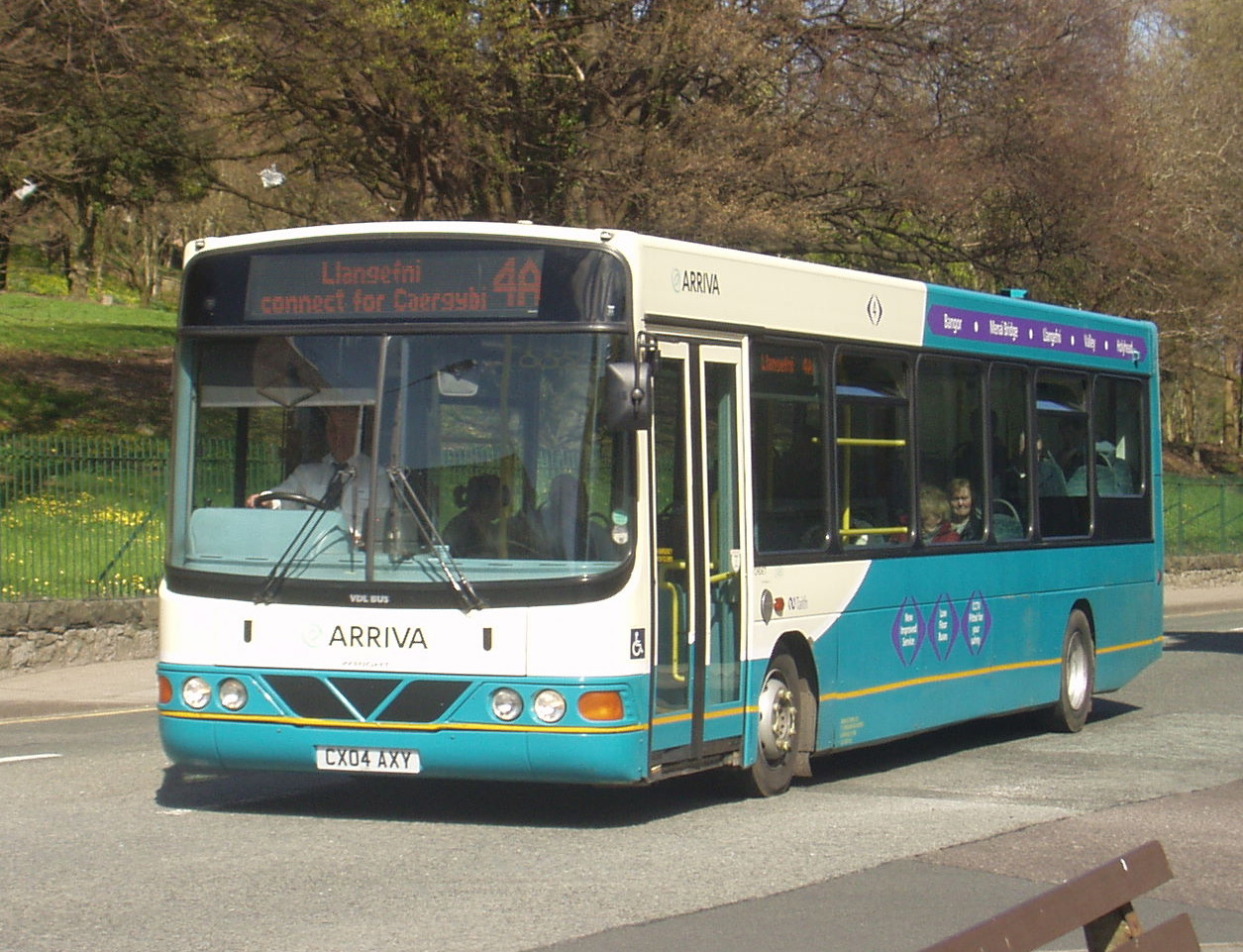
- Arriva Buses Wales Wright Cadet bodied VDL SB120 in Llandudno in May 2013

Overview
- Manufacturer: DAF/VDL
- Production: Eindhoven, Netherlands
- Assembly: 1999 -

Body and chassis
- Doors: 1-2
- Floor type: Low floor
- Related: VDL SB200

Powertrain
- Engine: Cummins B Series/ISBe

Dimensions
- Length: 9.5 to 10.8 metres
- Width: 2.5 metres
- Height: 3.0 metres

Chronology
- Successor: VDL SB180

The VDL SB120 (previously known as the DAF SB120) was a low floor light-weight midibus produced from 1999 by VDL Bus & Coach (formerly DAF Bus International) of the Netherlands primarily for the United Kingdom market.

The SB120 was similar to its major competitor, the Dennis Dart SLF. Powered by a Cummins B series 6-cylinder Euro II engine (later Cummins ISBe 4-cylinder Euro III engine), the SB120 was available in lengths from 8.5 to 10.8 metres. It was initially only available with the Wright Cadet body, but from February 2006, the Plaxton Centro body was also offered.

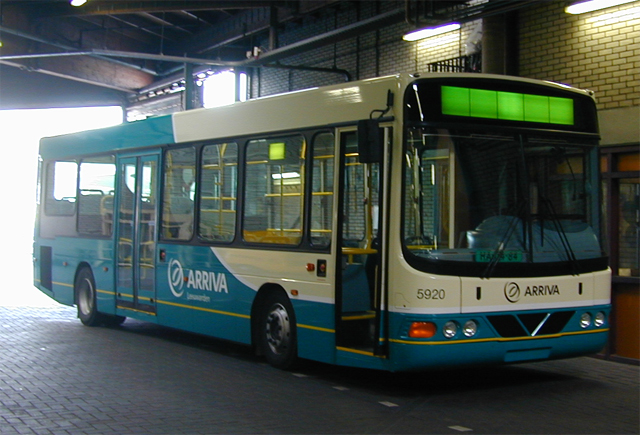
Wright Cadet bodied VDL SB120 in the Netherlands in 2002

Unlike the larger VDL SB200, the SB120 found a sizeable market, especially with Arriva (VDL importer in the UK) in both its UK (377) and the Netherlands operations. Other sizeable customers included Warrington Borough Transport (48), East Thames Buses (37) and Bus Éireann (35). The SB120 sold very well in VDL's home market, the Netherlands mainly using VDL Berkhof type Ambassador bodywork.

The SB120 was also sold in the United Kingdom by Volvo with the Wright Cadet body. This version, however, was sold as the Merit and did not carry either Wrightbus, VDL or Volvo branding. This version was sold to several operators including Yellow Buses, Bournemouth. However, with the change to Euro IV emissions from October 2006, Volvo and VDL ended this arrangement.

The SB120 was also sold for use in the Netherlands. In 2002, eight SB120 with Wright Cadet dual door bodywork were delivered to Arriva in the Netherlands for citybus service in Leeuwarden.

The SB120 chassis was also adopted by Wrightbus for the development of its hybrid-powered midibus, Wright Electrocity. The SB120 was superseded by the VDL SB180.
