= VDL Bus Group =

Netherlands based bus manufacturer

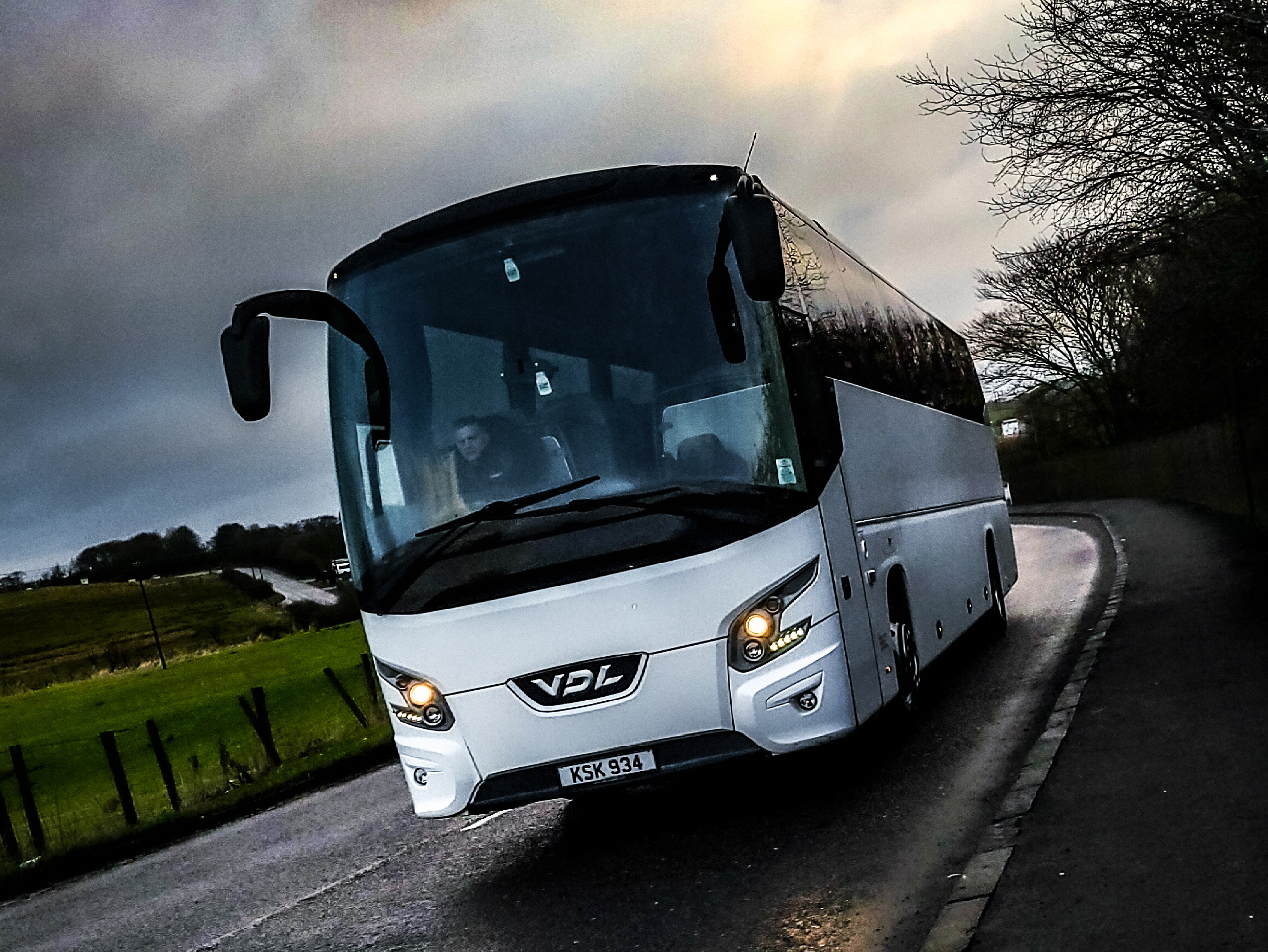
- A VDL Futura coach near Newhouse, Scotland.
- Industry: Automotive
- Predecessor: Berkhof; Bova; DAF Bus; Hainje; Jonckheere; Kusters
- Founded: 1993
- Headquarters: Valkenswaard, Netherlands
- Key people: Rolf-Jan Zweep (CEO)
- Products: Buses and Coaches
- Parent: VDL Groep
- Website: www.vdlbuscoach.com

VDL Group (also previously called as DAF Bus) is a Dutch vehicle manufacturer. It is an amalgamation of several bus building companies within the VDL Groep. VDL Bus Group has manufacturing plants in Belgium and the Netherlands. By 2018 VDL Bus & Coach sold 500 electric buses.

== History ==
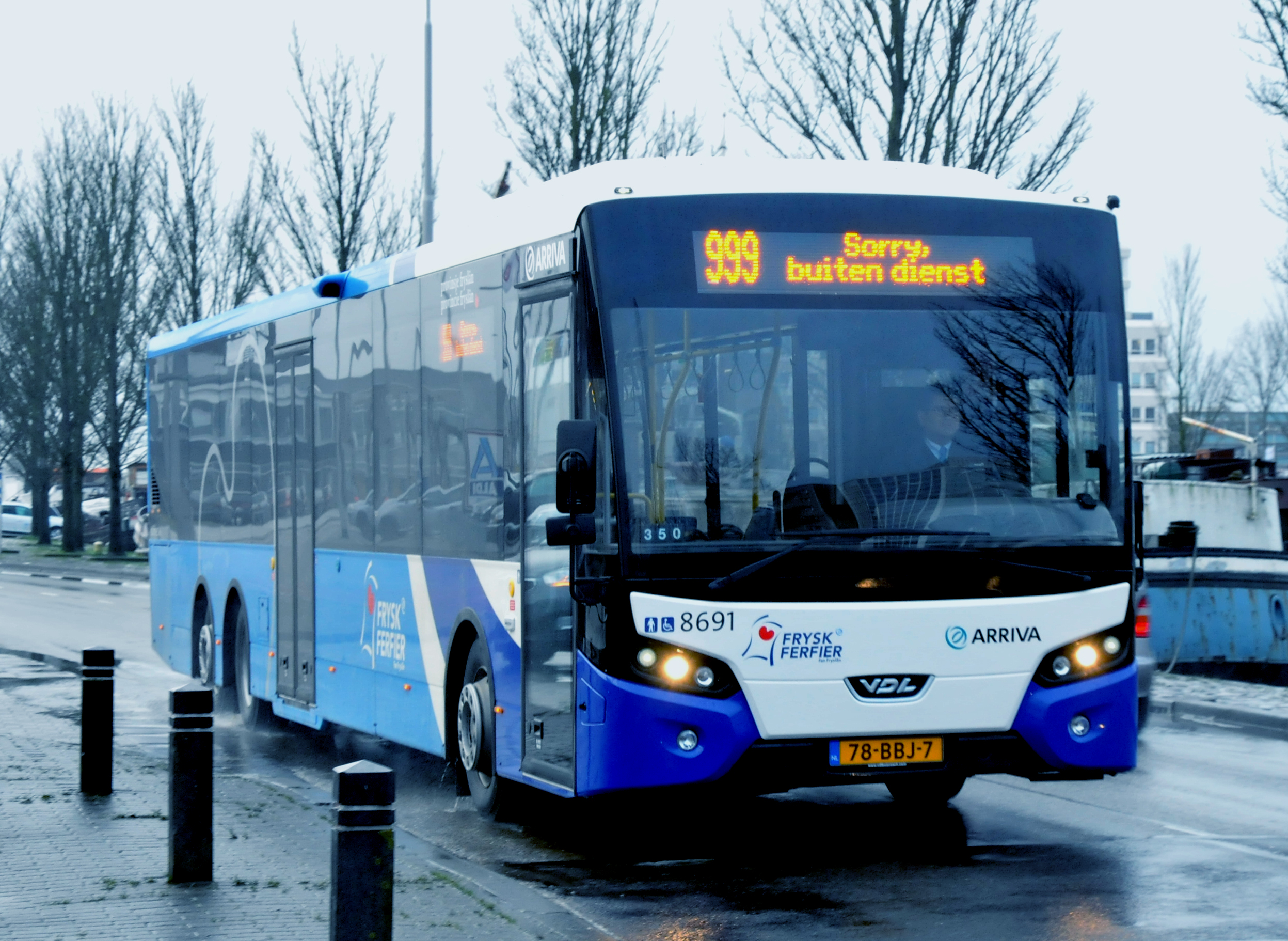
VDL Citea XLE-145

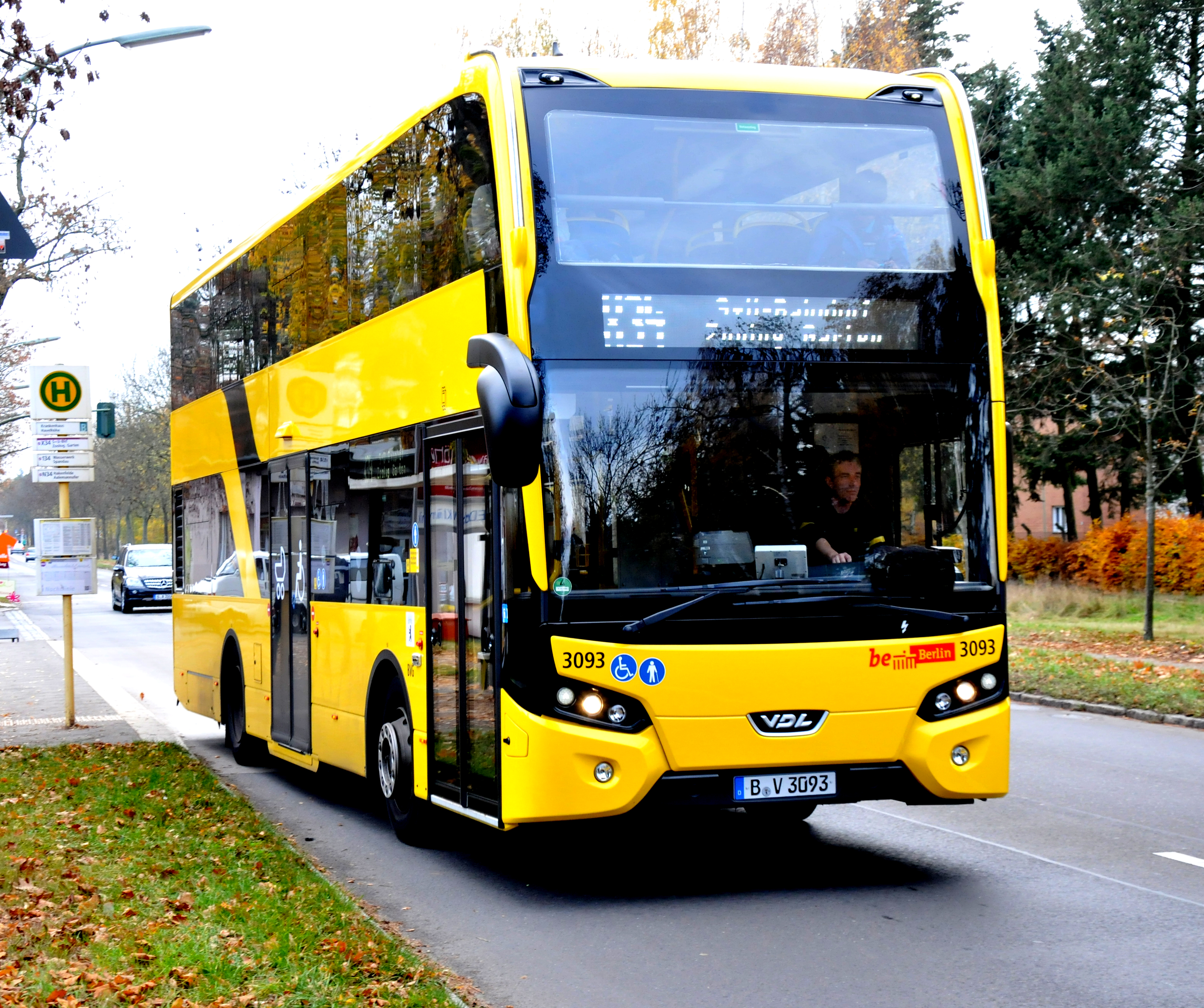
VDL Citea DLF-114

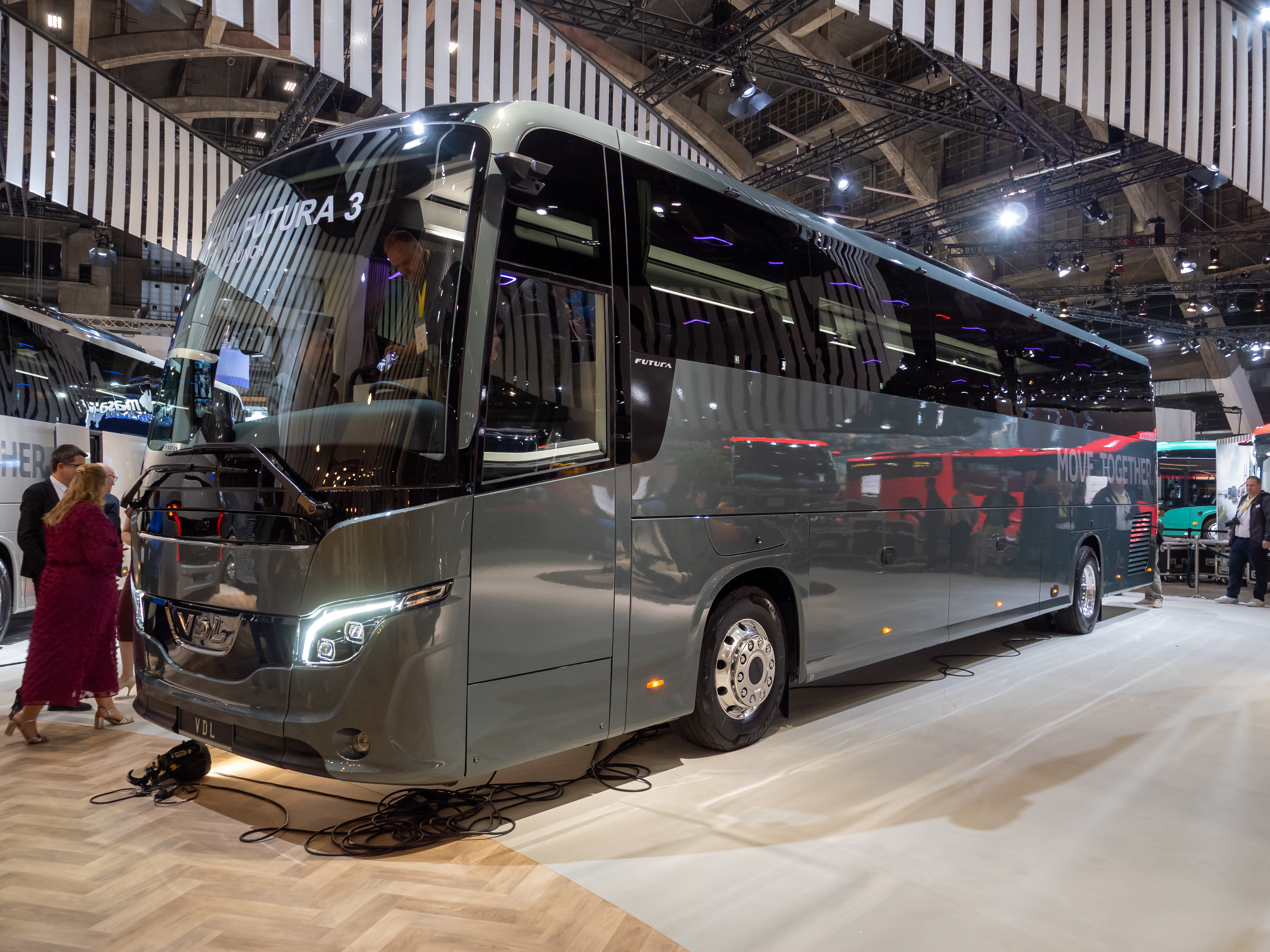
VDL Futura FHD3

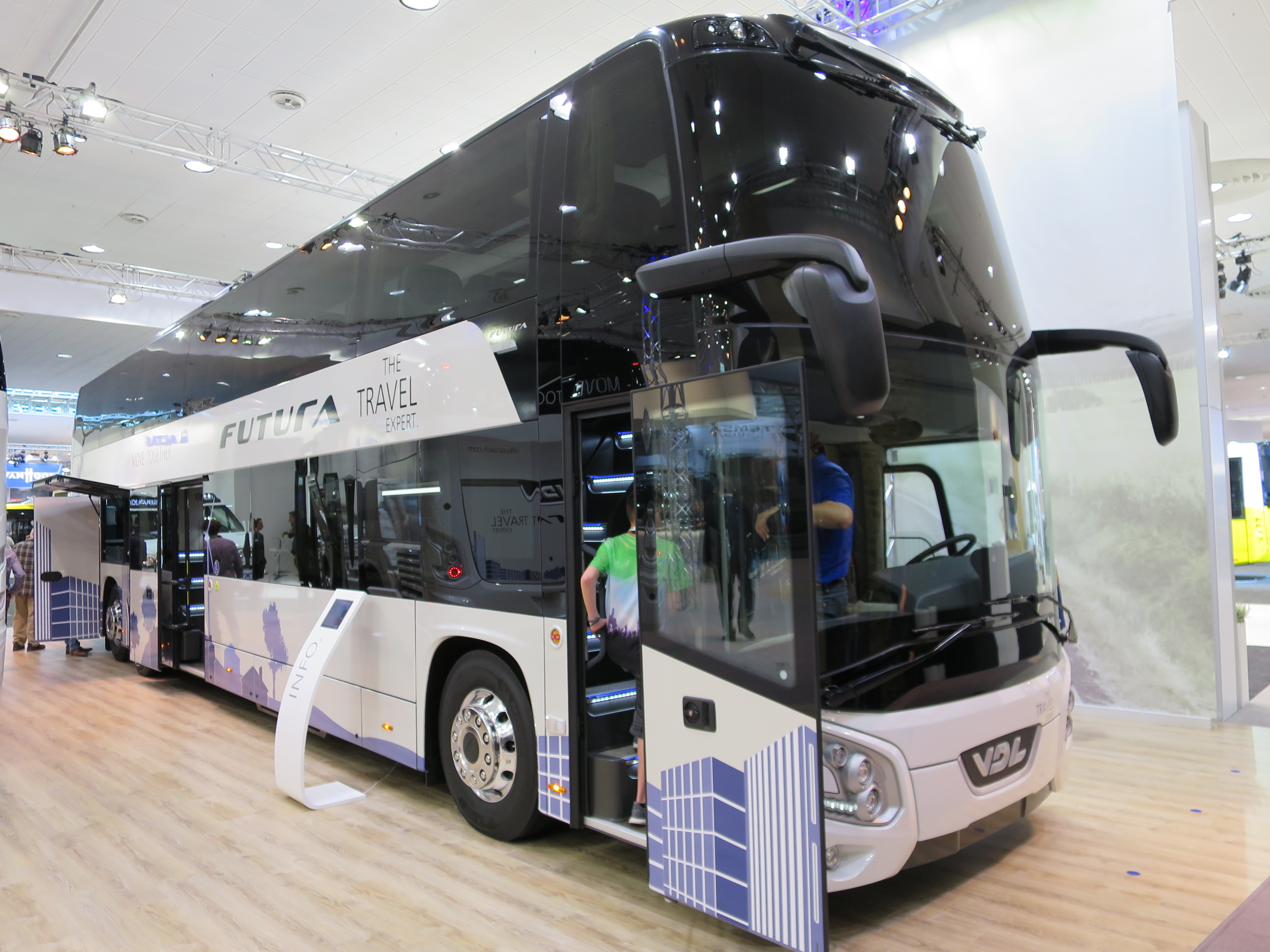
VDL Futura FDD2-141

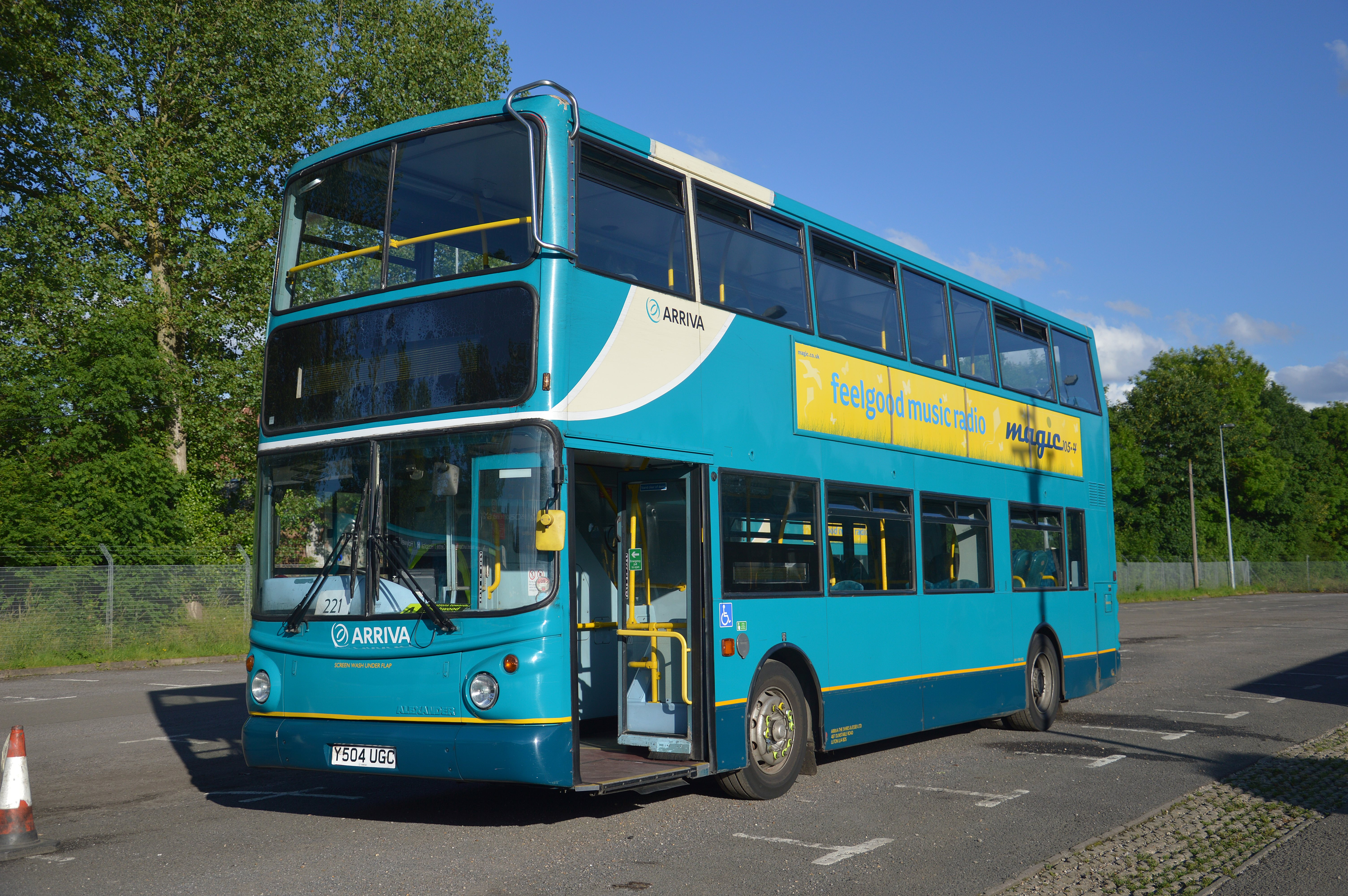
Arriva Shires & Essex Alexander ALX400 bodied DAF DB250LF at Northwood tube station in June 2014

Plaxton Paramount bodied DAF MB200

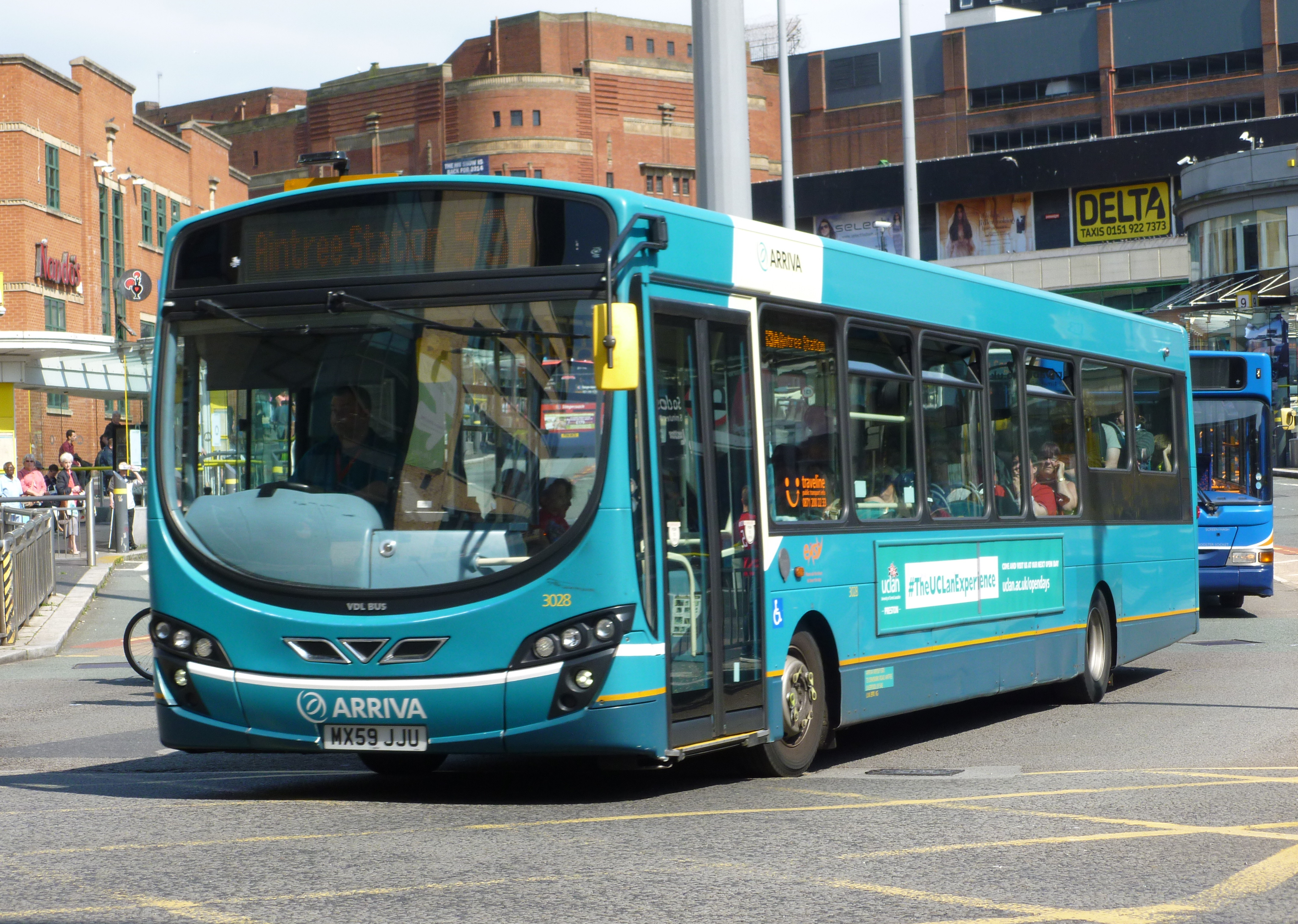
Arriva North West Wright Pulsar 2 bodied VDL SB200 in Liverpool

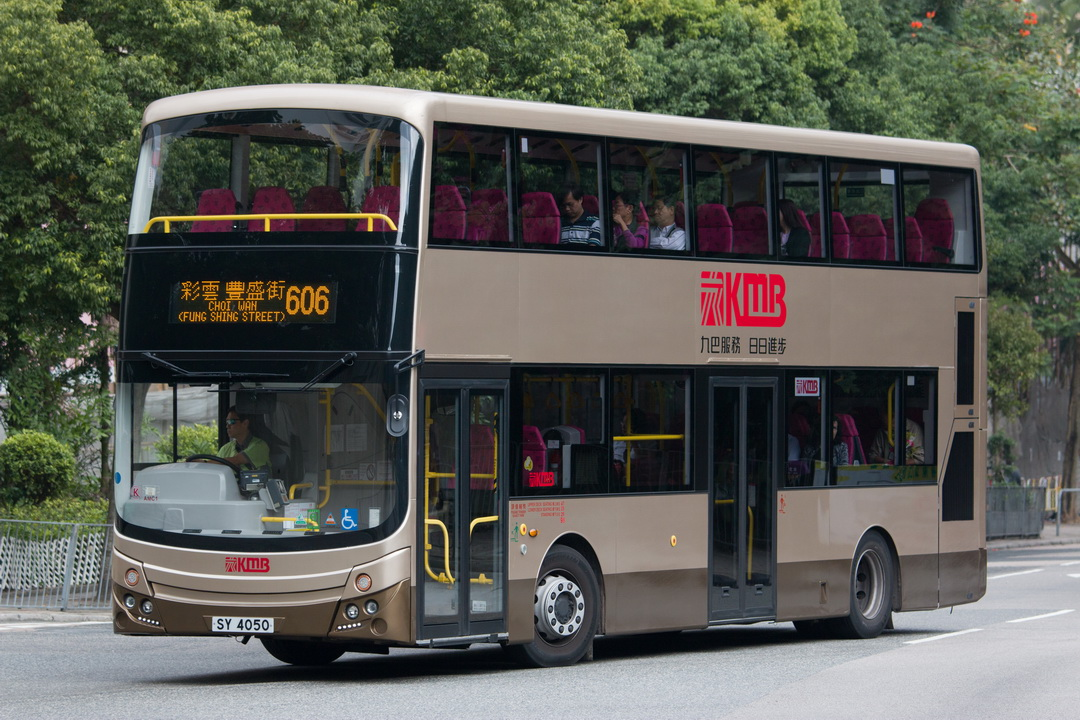
Kowloon Motor Bus MCV DD102 bodied VDL DB300 in Hong Kong in November 2014

VDL Bus & Coach originates from the VDL Groep acquiring the following bus building companies in the Netherlands and Belgium:

- Berkhof (acquired in 1998, based in Valkenswaard, became VDL Bus Modules). Formerly part of Berkhof Jonckheere Groep, which VDL Groep acquired in 1998.
- Bova (acquired in 2003, based in Valkenswaard, became VDL Bus Valkenswaard).
- DAF Bus (acquired in 1993, based in Eindhoven, became VDL Bus Chassis). Originally named DAF Bus International after being separated from the truck-building business of DAF, it joined United Bus in 1990. It became a subsidiary of VDL Groep after United Bus collapsed in 1993. DAF Bus International was renamed VDL Bus International in September 2003. In 2008, VDL Bus International was renamed VDL Bus Chassis.
- Hainje (acquired in 1998, based in Heerenveen, became VDL Bus Heerenveen). Formerly part of Berkhof Jonckheere Groep, which VDL Groep acquired in 1998.
- Jonckheere (acquired in 1998, based in Roeselare, became VDL Bus Roeselare). Formerly part of Berkhof Jonckheere Groep, which VDL Groep acquired in 1998.
- Kusters (acquired in 1998, based in Venlo, became VDL Bus Venlo). Formerly part of Berkhof Jonckheere Groep, which VDL Groep acquired in 1998.
- Van Hool (acquired in 2024). Acquired the bus building part of the company after the company became bankrupt. Performed a merger with Van Hool afterwards, changing their name from "VDL Bus & Coach" to "VDL Bus Group".

== Leadership ==
- Rémi Henkemans (2017)
- Henk Coppens (2017–2021)
- Paul van Vuuren (2021–2023)
- Rolf-Jan Zweep (2023–present)

== Products ==
=== Current ===
==== Integral buses and coaches ====
- Citea
- Futura
- Midcity

==== Chassis ====
- SB180 - Low entry
- SB200 - Low entry
- SB230 - Low entry
- SBR230 - Low entry
- DB300 - Double deck
- TB2175 - Heavy duty (front engine)
- TBR2175 - Heavy duty (front engine)
- SB4000 - Intercity / Coach
- SBR4000 - Coach

==== Van conversions ====
- MidCity
- MidEuro

=== Historical (including DAF bus models) ===
==== Integral coaches and whole vehicles ====
- Lexio (interurban bus body on VDL SB4000 chassis, marketed as VDL Bova Lexio)
- Magiq (integral coach, ex Bova, renamed VDL Bova Magiq)
- Synergy (double deck coach body on VDL SBR4000 chassis, marketed as VDL Bova Synergy)

==== Chassis ====
- B62
- B1100
- B1300
- B1500
- B1502
- B1600
- DB250
- MB200
- MB205
- MB210
- MB230
- MBG200
- MBG205
- SB120
- SB201
- SB210
- SB220
- SB225
- SBR235
- SB250
- SB260 - Chassis modules for VDL Citea SLF
- SB1600
- SB1602
- SB1605
- SB2000
- SB2005
- SB2100
- SB2300
- SB2305
- SB2700
- SB2705
- SB2750
- SB3000
- SBG220
- SBR3000/SBR3015
- TB100
- TB102
- TB160
- TB163
- TB300
- TB2100
- TB2105
