= Wright Commander =

Low-floor bus body on VDL SB200 chassis

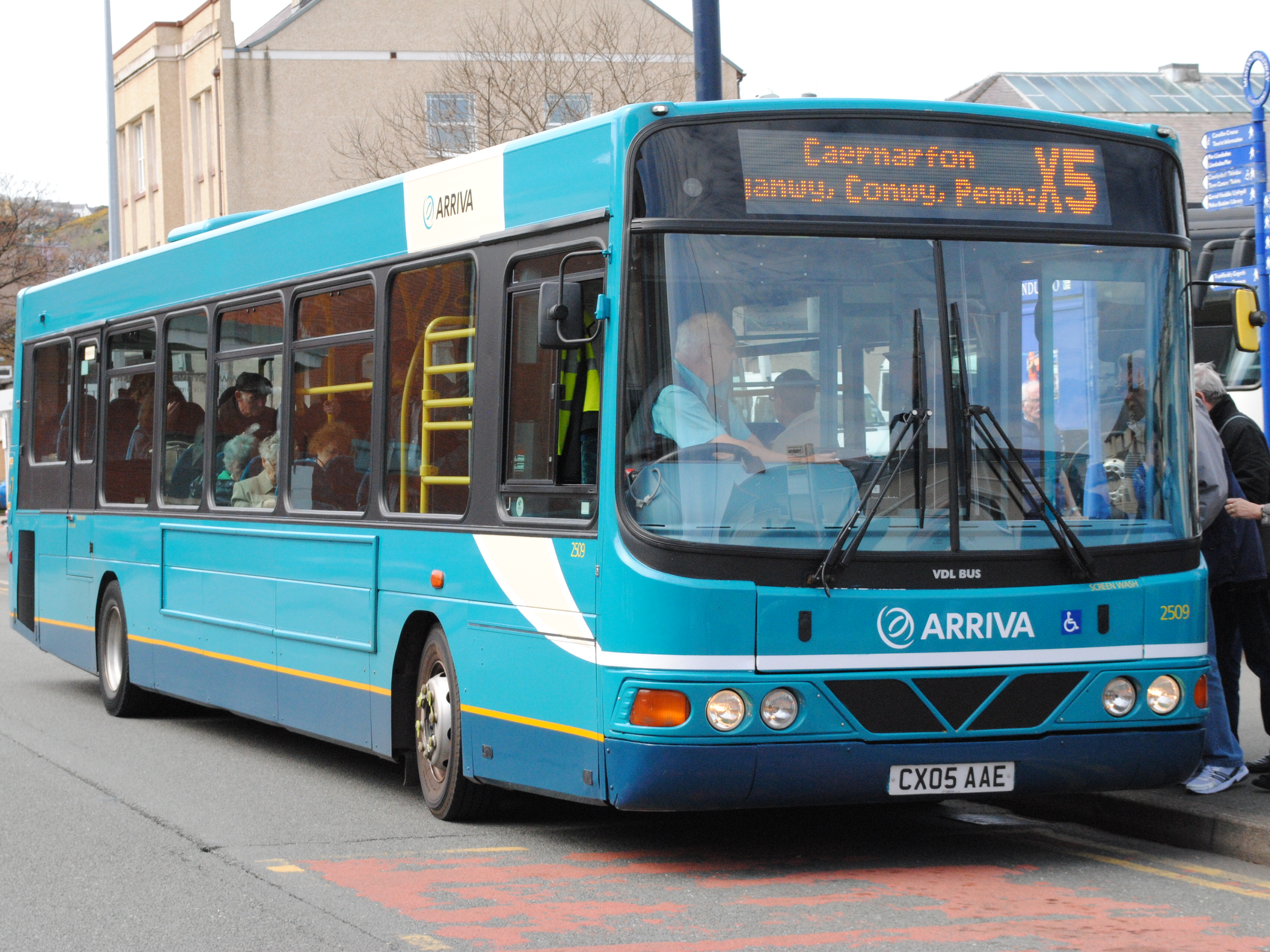
- Arriva Buses Wales Wright Commander bodied VDL SB200 in Llandudno in May 2013

Overview
- Manufacturer: Wrightbus
- Production: 2002 - 2007
- Assembly: Ballymena, Northern Ireland

Body and chassis
- Doors: 1 or 2
- Floor type: Low floor Low entry
- Chassis: DAF/VDL SB200
- Related: Wright Cadet

Powertrain
- Engine: Cummins ISBe
- Transmission: Voith

Dimensions
- Length: 12.0 metres
- Width: 2.5 metres
- Height: 3.0 metres

Chronology
- Successor: Wright Pulsar

The Wright Commander was a low-floor single-decker bus body built on the DAF/VDL SB200 chassis by Wrightbus between 2002 and 2007.

== History ==
Visually and structurally, it is a larger version of the Wright Cadet. Along with the Cadet, it perpetuated the 'Classic' styling for several years after the Scania (Axcess-Floline) and Volvo (Renown) based equivalents had been phased out. Of the 315 produced, 288 were purchased by Arriva, the first 14 delivered to Arriva Midlands North for services in Telford. 188 of these Arriva Commanders were exported to the Netherlands in left-hand drive configuration for use by the group's Netherlands subsidiary.

The Commander was superseded by the Pulsar.
