= Wright Cadet =

Low-floor midibus bodywork on DAF/VDL SB120 chassis

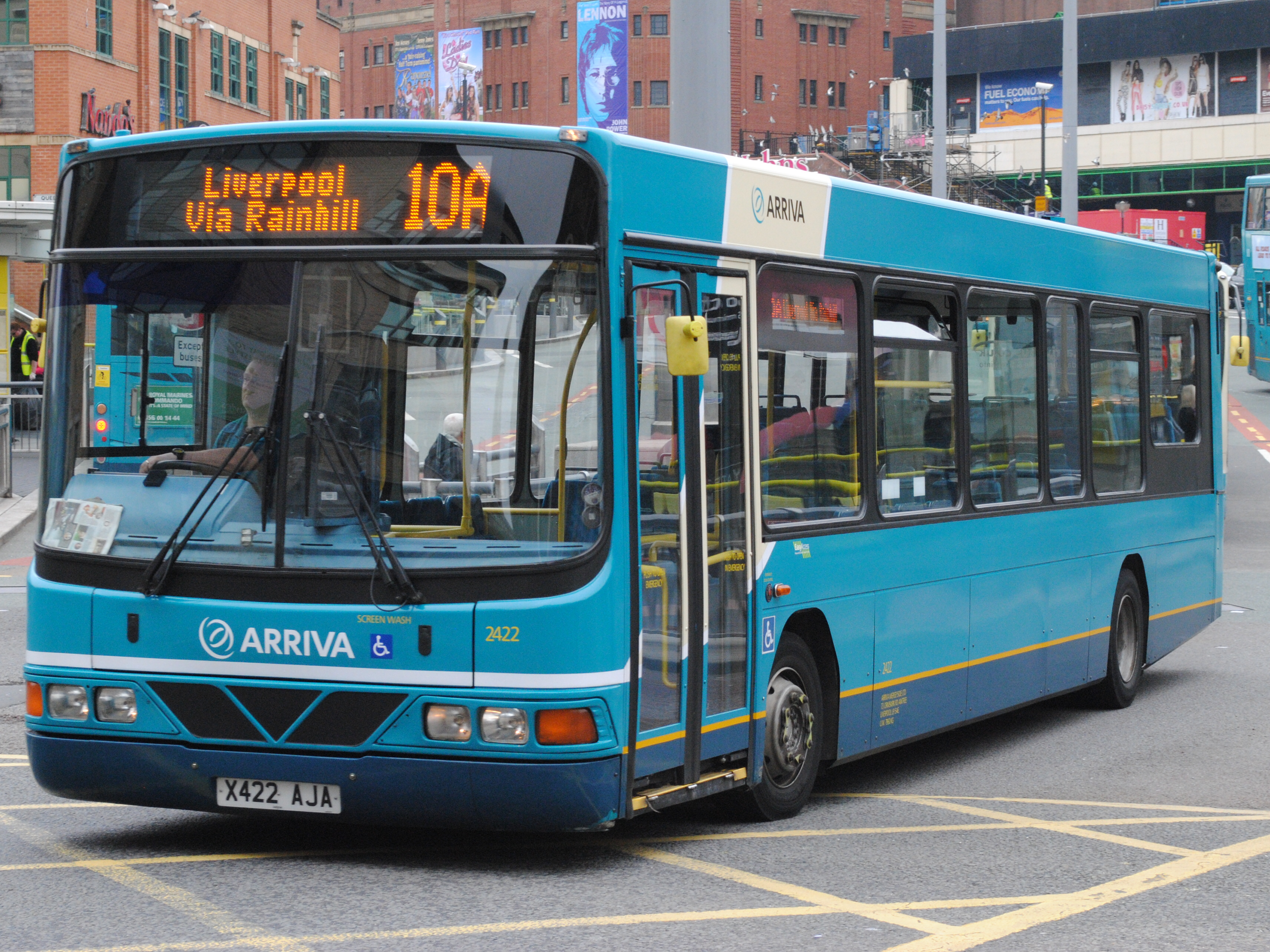
- Arriva North West Wright Cadet bodied DAF SB120 in Liverpool in May 2013

Overview
- Manufacturer: Wrightbus
- Production: 2000 - 2008
- Assembly: Ballymena, Northern Ireland

Body and chassis
- Doors: 1 or 2
- Floor type: Low floor
- Chassis: DAF/VDL SB120
- Related: Wright Commander

Powertrain
- Engine: Cummins B Series/ISBe

Dimensions
- Length: 9.4 m (30 ft 10 in), 10.2 m (33 ft 6 in) & 10.8 m (35 ft 5 in)
- Width: 2.5 m (8 ft 2 in)
- Height: 3.0 m (9 ft 10 in)

Chronology
- Predecessor: Wright Crusader

The Wright Cadet was a low floor midibus body built on the DAF/VDL SB120 chassis by Wrightbus between 2000 and 2008. It was sold via VDL dealer Arriva Bus & Coach. Of the 681 produced, 366 were for Arriva subsidiaries, including eight for its Netherlands subsidiary. Bus Éireann purchased 35, and UniversityBus of Hatfield purchased five between 2000 and 2001.

== Volvo Merit ==
The SB120/Cadet combination was also sold through Volvo Buses for a time following the withdrawal from sale of its own B6BLE chassis in 2002 without a direct replacement. Cadets sold through Volvo had all DAF/VDL badging removed and were marketed as the Volvo Merit, although they were visually identical to Cadets sold through Wrightbus; forty-eight were sold in this way to Warrington Borough Transport between 2003 and 2008.
