= Berkhof Groep =

- Industry: Automotive
- Founded: 1970
- Founder: Arthur Berkhof; Henk Berkhof
- Defunct: 2010
- Successor: VDL Bus & Coach
- Headquarters: The Netherlands
- Products: Buses
- Parent: VDL Groep
- Subsidiaries: Jonckheere
- Website: www.vdlberkhof.com

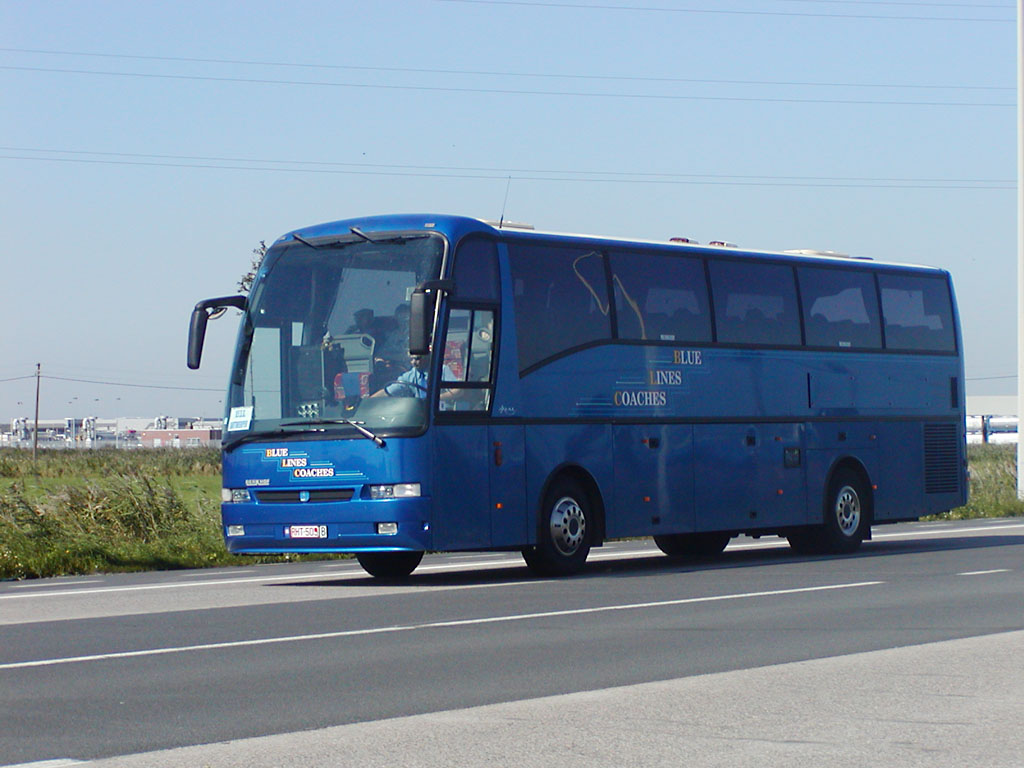
A Blue Line Coaches, Belgium Berkhof Axial 70 in September 2002

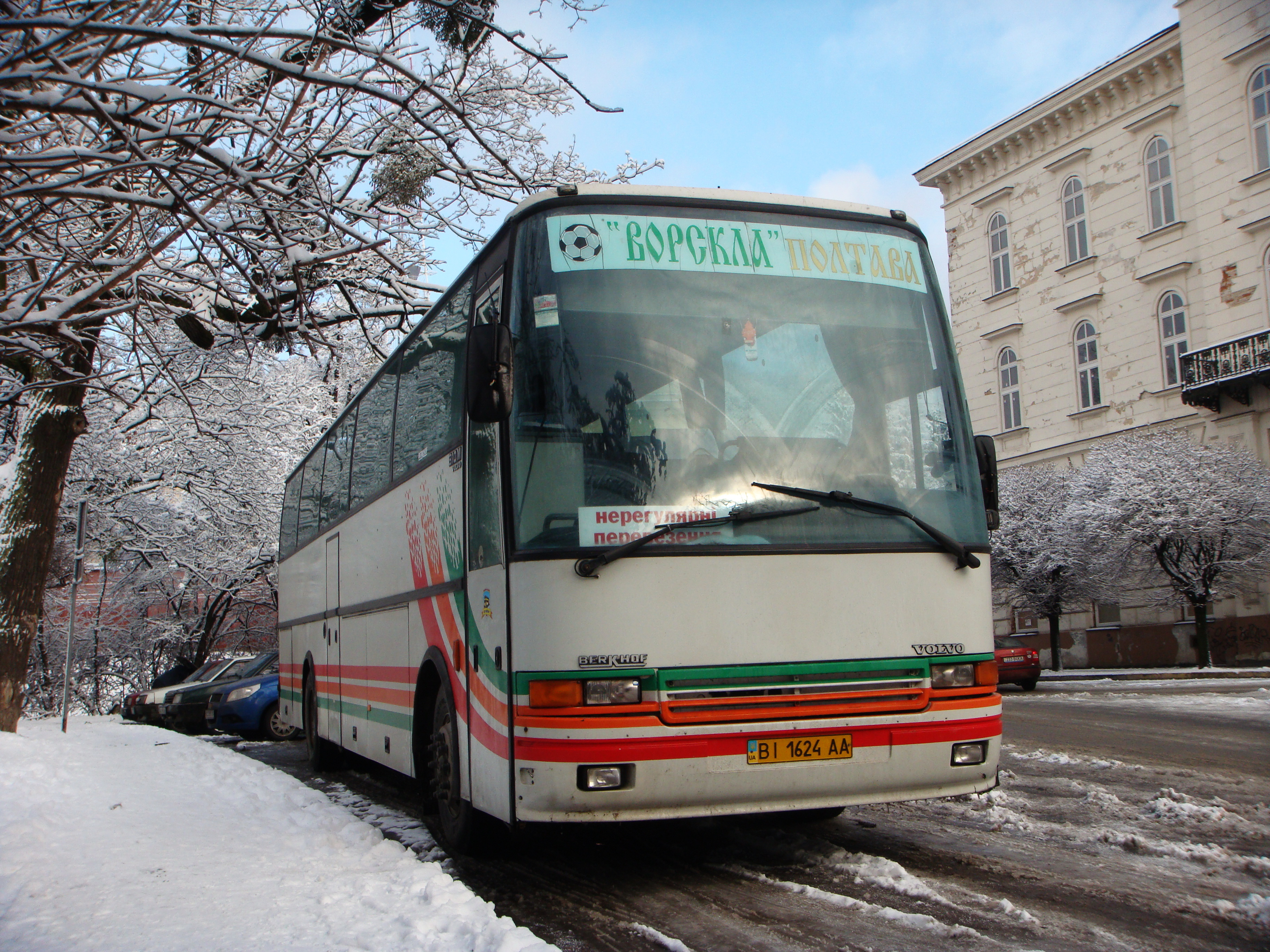
Berkhof Excellence 1000 coach with Volvo chassis in Lviv, Ukraine

Berkhof Groep (later Berkhof Jonckheere Groep and VDL Berkhof) was a Netherlands based bus and coach builder, founded in 1970 by Arthur Berkhof and his son Henk. It started with only 10 employees in a 1,000 m^{2} factory. During the first 18 months the company only carried out bus repairs.

In 1985, the operation moved to a brand new 10,000 m^{2} facility in Valkenswaard. The number of employees was now 132. The factory expanded in 1989 by an additional 10,000 m^{2} resulting in a production capacity of 350 units a year following the acquisition of Hainje.

In 1994 Belgium bus and coach manufacturer Jonckheere with a total sales of 400 units per year and 500 employees, was acquired. The total staff number of employees of the Berkhof Groep now reached 1,200.

In 1997, the company changed its name from Berkhof Groep to Berkhof Jonckheere Groep. In 1998 it was bought by the VDL Groep and in 2010 was subsumed by VDL Bus & Coach.

The company has also built low-floor articulated trolleybuses for Arnhem in the Netherlands, and Solingen in Germany.

== Former models ==
- Ambassador
- Axial 50
- Axial 70
- Axial 100 DD
- Eclipse
- Excellence 500
- Excellence 1000
- Excellence 2000 HL / HLE
- Excellence 3000
