= Wright Crusader =

Low-floor bus body on Dennis Dart SLF, Volvo B6LE and B6BLE chassis

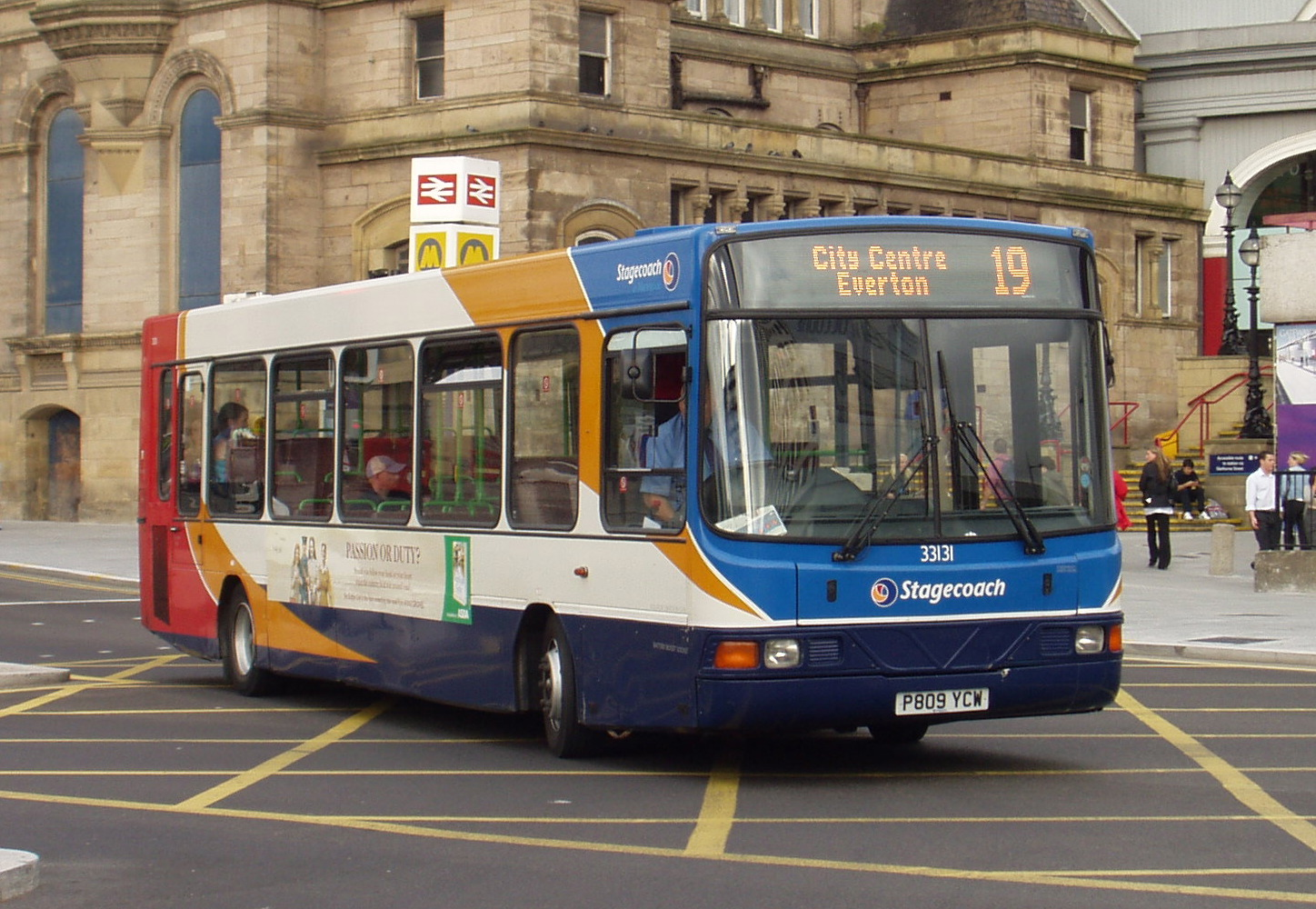
- Stagecoach Merseyside Wright Crusader bodied Dennis Dart SLF in Liverpool in September 2007

Overview
- Manufacturer: Wrightbus
- Production: 1995-2002
- Assembly: Ballymena, Northern Ireland
- Designer: Trevor Erskine

Body and chassis
- Doors: 1 or 2
- Floor type: Low floor
- Chassis: Crusader; Dennis Dart SLF; Volvo B6LE; Crusader 2; Volvo B6BLE
- Related: Wright Pathfinder

Powertrain
- Engine: Cummins B Series (Dennis Dart SLF); Volvo (Volvo B6LE/Volvo B6BLE)
- Capacity: 51-63 passengers

Dimensions
- Length: 9.4–10.8 metres (31–35 ft)
- Width: 2.4 metres (7 ft 10 in)
- Height: 2.95 metres (9 ft 8 in)

Chronology
- Predecessor: Wright Handybus
- Successor: Wright Cadet

The Wright Crusader was a single-deck midibus body built on Dennis Dart SLF, Volvo B6LE and Volvo B6BLE chassis by Wrightbus between 1995 and 2002.

== First generation (1995–2000) ==
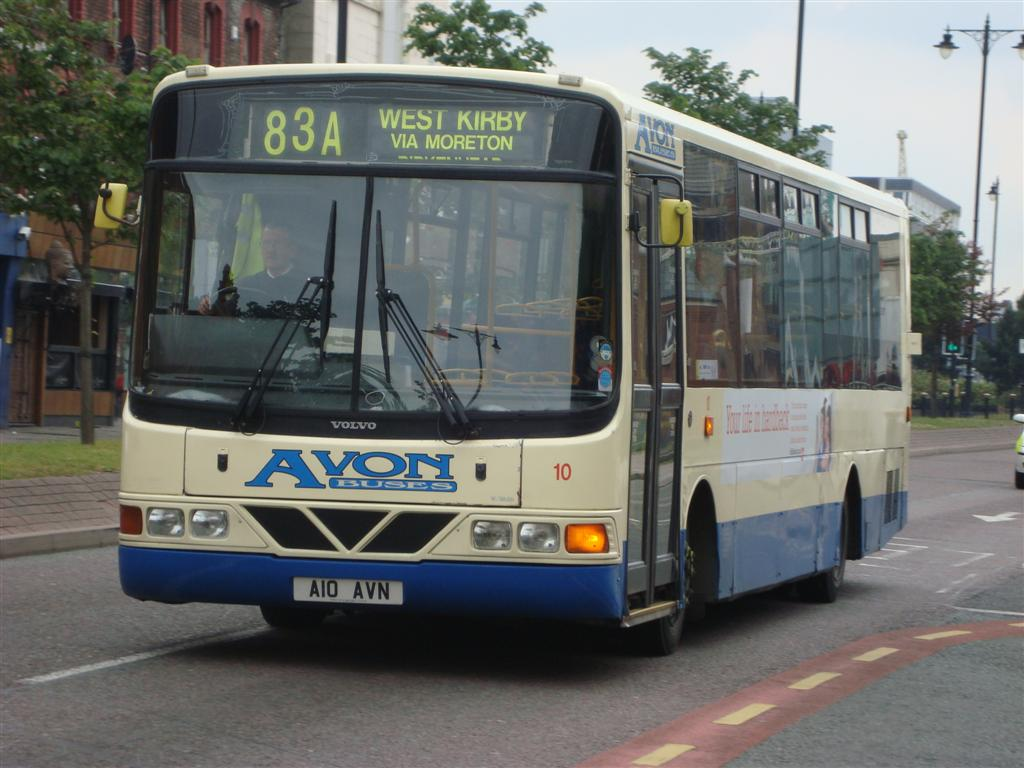
Avon Buses Wright Crusader bodied Volvo B6LE built with bonded windows

The Wright Crusader was first introduced on the 10.6 metres (35 ft) Volvo B6LE chassis in 1995, intended to replace the step-entrance Volvo B6 and Dennis Dart-based Wright Handybus. The first generation Crusader shared design characteristics from other Wright products of the time, being built with a Alusuisse bolted aluminium frame and bonded window glazing, and the interior could be configured to carry 54 passengers, including wheelchair users. The 325 millimetres (12.8 in) low entrance step was capable of being lowered to 235 millimetres (9.3 in) at the kerbside via the 'kneeling' function of the chassis, and a shallow ramp from the entrance door to the passenger compartment was present on Crusader bodied B6LEs to accommodate for the front axle while remaining compliant with the recommendations of the Disabled Persons Transport Advisory Committee (DiPTAC) on improving wheelchair and pushchair access.

The Crusader body was also launched on the Dennis Dart SLF chassis in June 1996, available in lengths of 9.4 metres (31 ft), 10.2 metres (33 ft) and 10.8 metres (35 ft) to compete with other midibuses entering the low-floor market. Compared to the Volvo B6LE-based Crusader, this variant could carry a total of 51 to 63 passengers depending on length, and was built with a flat floor and 'kneeling' suspension as standard; the only steps in the interior were two that led to raised seats situated on raised rear wheel arches. Notably, the Crusader bodied Dart SLF was the first low-floor Wright body to feature rubber gasket windows, made possible due to the improved rigidity of the Dart SLF chassis.

Following the construction of one prototype and a demonstrator, the first ten production Crusaders, built on Volvo B6LE chassis, were delivered to Mainline Buses during 1996.

Of the 425 first generation Crusaders produced, 154 were on Dennis Dart SLF chassis and 272 on Volvo B6LE chassis. Travel West Midlands purchased 149 B6LEs, 23 of which went to subsidiary Travel Merry Hill, and GM Buses North purchased 46 Crusaders on the B6LE chassis. The only London bus operator to take delivery of Crusaders throughout its production run was London United, who took eight Crusaders on Dart SLF chassis for use on route H25 in Hounslow in November 1996, while the only export order for the first-generation Crusader was to ACTION of Canberra, Australia, who purchased 25 Crusaders on Dart SLF chassis in 1997.

== Second generation (1999–2002) ==
The second generation Crusader, known as the Crusader 2, was introduced in 1999 and built exclusively on the Volvo B6BLE chassis, the successor to the B6LE. In contrast to early first generation Crusaders, all Crusader 2s have shallower windows with a deeper panel above, bringing them in line with other Wrightbus designs like the Endurance and Pathfinder; some of the later built first generation Crusaders shared this characteristic however, making the two designs indistinguishable except for the different chassis.

The first Crusaders 2s were delivered to Mainline in April 1999; the delivery included one rebodied B6LE with prototype Crusader 2 bodywork, as well as nine newly built Crusader 2s. Of the 267 Crusader 2s produced, FirstGroup purchased 86, Arriva 61 and Dublin Bus 52.

== Gallery ==
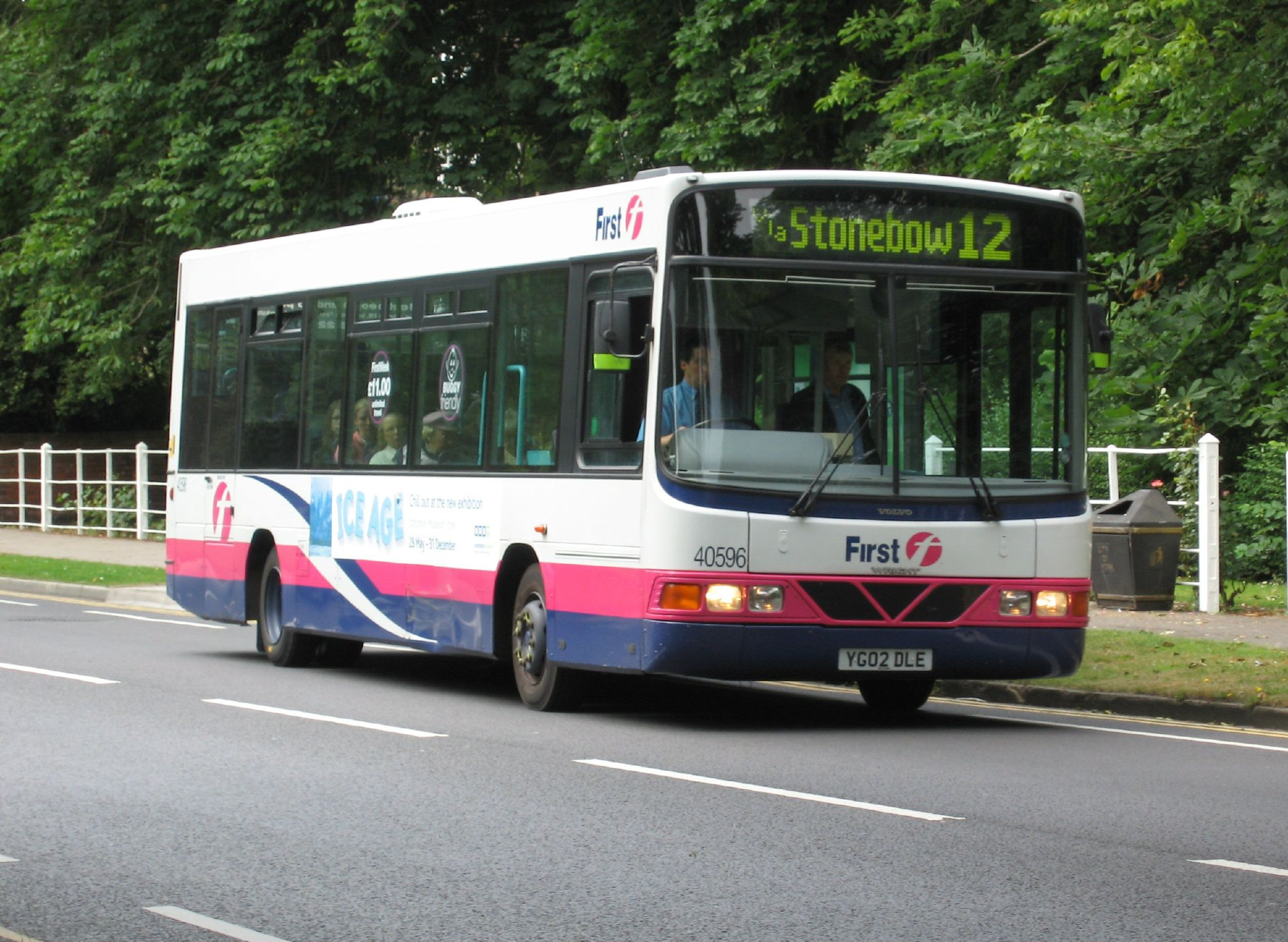
Wright Crusader 2 bodied Volvo B6BLE

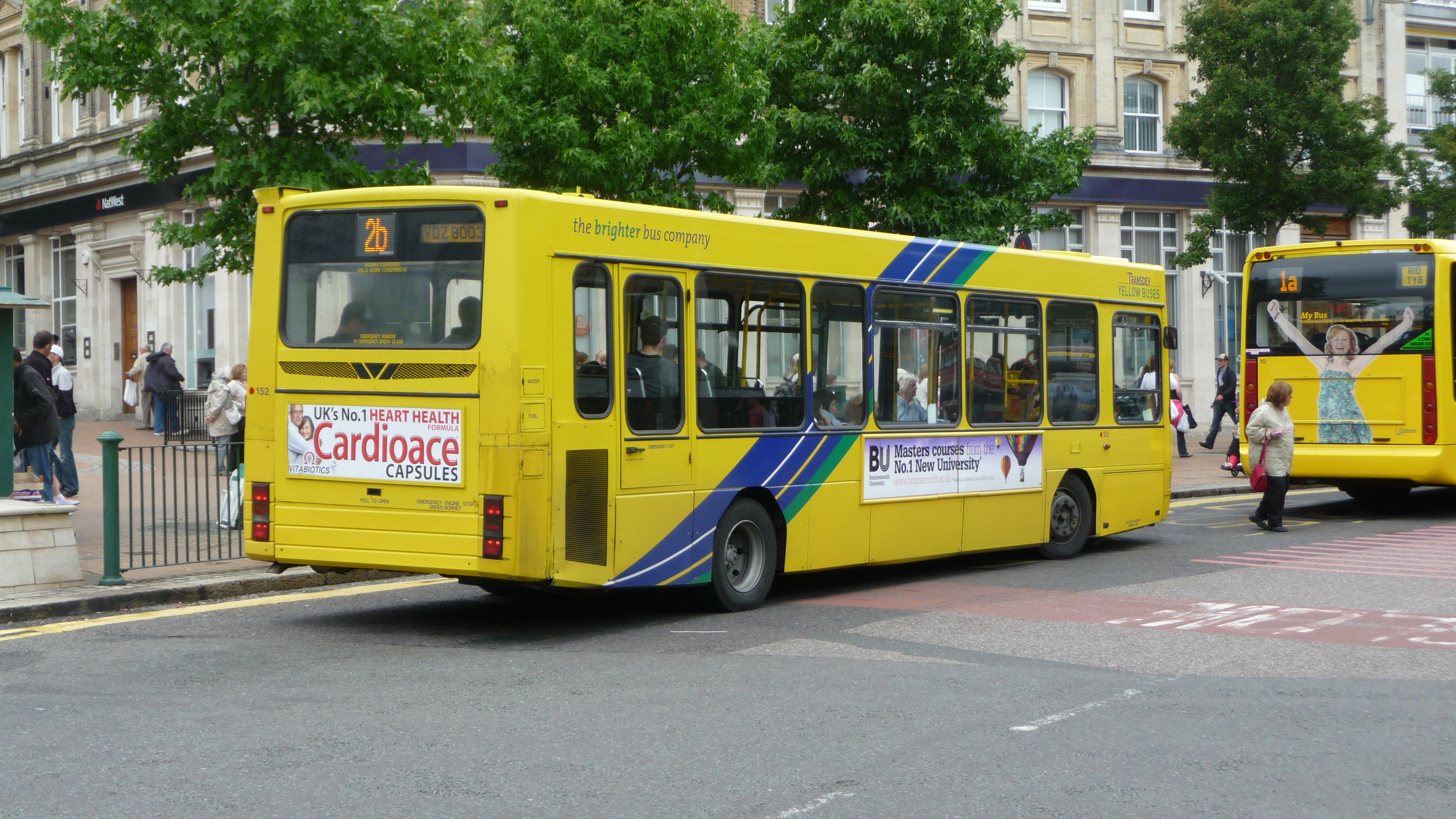
Wright Crusader bodied Dennis Dart SLF rear
