= Wright Handybus =

Step-entrance midibus body on Dennis and Leyland chassis

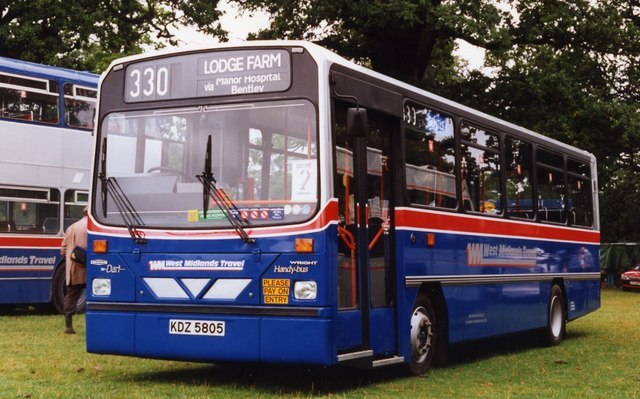
- West Midlands Travel Wright Handybus bodied Dennis Dart with flat driver's windscreen at Transport Museum Wythall in 1995

Overview
- Manufacturer: Wrightbus
- Production: 1990–1995
- Assembly: Ballymena, Northern Ireland
- Designer: Trevor Erskine

Body and chassis
- Doors: 1
- Floor type: Step entrance
- Chassis: Dennis Dart; Leyland Swift

Powertrain
- Engine: Cummins B Series (Dennis Dart)
- Capacity: 29 to 37 seated

Dimensions
- Length: 8.5 m (27 ft 11 in), 9 m (29 ft 6 in) and 9.8 m (32 ft 2 in)
- Width: 2.52 m (8 ft 3 in)
- Height: 3.02 m (9 ft 11 in)

Chronology
- Successor: Wright Crusader

The Wright Handybus was a single-deck bus body built primarily on Dennis Dart chassis and a small number of the higher-floor Leyland Swift chassis by Wrightbus between 1990 and 1995.

== Design ==
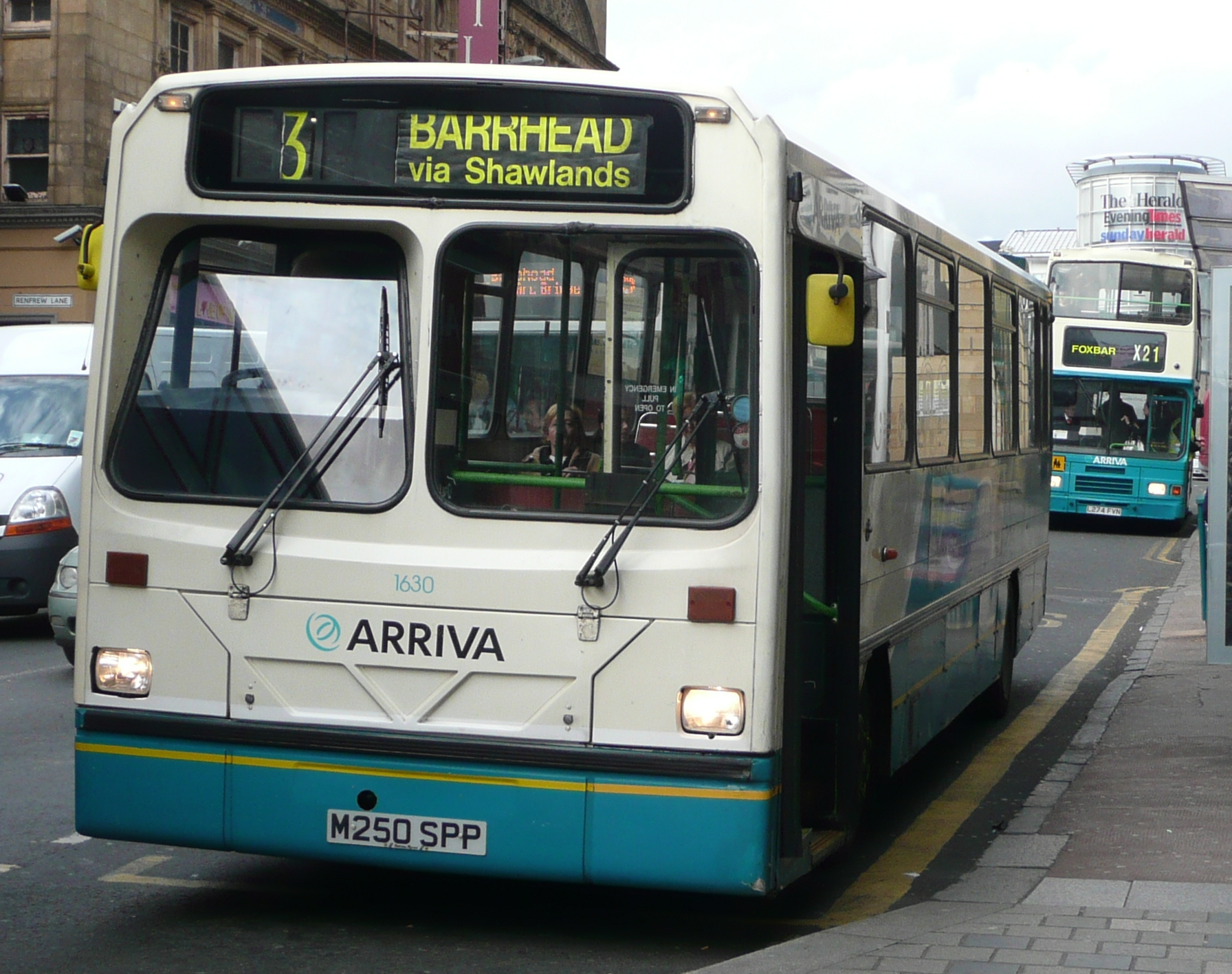
Arriva Scotland West Wright Handybus bodied Dennis Dart with raked driver's windscreen in Glasgow in April 2008

Launched in 1990 on the Dennis Dart chassis after a year of design in consultation with London Regional Transport, the Wright Handybus was built with an Alusuisse bolted aluminium structure incorporating alloy body panels, gasket side windows and two windscreen styles: some Handybuses had a single-piece flat windscreen, while London Regional Transport specified a Leyland Lynx-like design of two separate flat windscreens, with the glass on the driver's side being raked back. The outward styling of the Handybus was quite plain, with a flat front, a large front destination display, a flexibly-mounted front bumper and a Wright logo moulded into the front fascia.

Internally, the Handybus was built with accessible features to the suggested specifications of the Disabled Persons Transport Advisory Committee (DIPTAC), including anti-slip flooring and low-height split-step entrance, wide gangways and luggage pens, painted handrails and an illuminated 'bus stopping' sign. Additional internal design elements developed specifically for London Regional Transport included a driver's alarm in the cab and an assault screen, while other features included underseat heating, moquette-trimmed seats, carpeted walls and ceilings.

The Handybus was succeeded in 1995 by the low-floor Wright Crusader.

== Operators ==
London Regional Transport was the first and also the largest customer, buying nearly 200 Handybus bodied Dennis Darts for its various subsidiaries; the first 43 were delivered at launch to CentreWest, with a total of 107 delivered to the subsidiary between 1990 and 1993. One CentreWest Handybus has since been preserved by the London Transport Museum in Acton.

Go-Ahead Northern were the second-largest operator of Handybuses, taking delivery of over 80 between 1992 and 1994, and Ulsterbus and Citybus had 40 between them which were delivered in 1994. Thirteen were delivered to County Bus & Coach between 1992 and 1994, and five were delivered to Red Bus of North Devon. Five were also delivered to West Midlands Travel for evaluation use on services in Walsall in 1991.

Operators of the Handybus on Leyland Swift chassis included Stevensons of Uttoxeter, who took delivery of four during 1992.
