= South Yorkshire Transport =

Bus operator in South Yorkshire, England

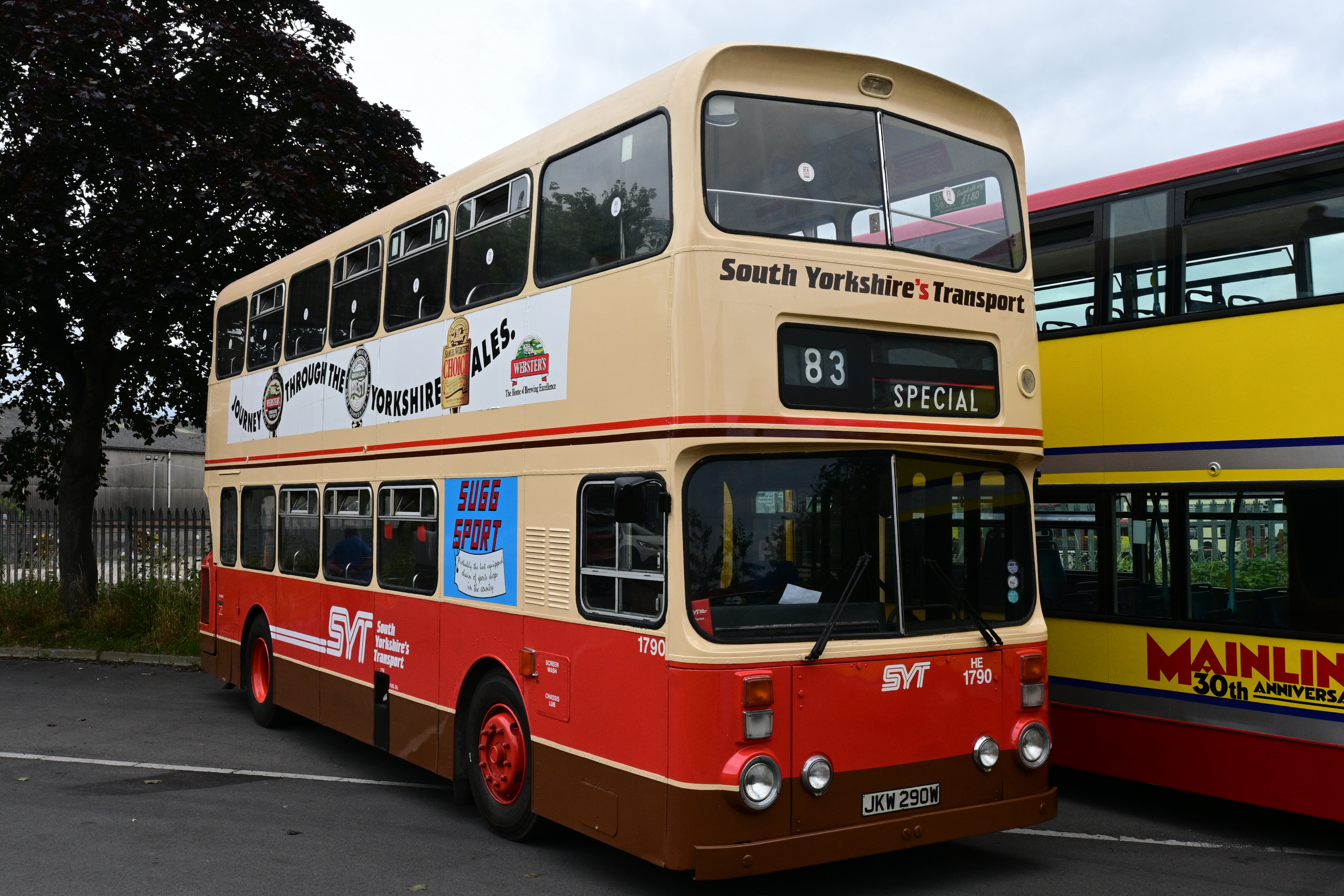
- Preserved Alexander bodied Leyland Atlantean in Aldwarke, Rotherham in July 2024
- Founded: 1986
- Defunct: 1998
- Headquarters: Doncaster
- Service area: South Yorkshire
- Service type: Bus operator
- Depots: 8
- Fleet: 1000+ (1985); 700+ (1998)

South Yorkshire Transport (SYT) was a bus operator that provided services around South Yorkshire and outlying areas. The company was formed as an 'arm's-length' successor to the South Yorkshire Passenger Transport Executive (SYPTE) in 1986, which was broken up as a result of the deregulation of bus services. South Yorkshire Transport operated buses in and around Doncaster, Rotherham and Sheffield with some services extending to Chesterfield, Leeds and Barnsley.

In November 1993 South Yorkshire Transport, now rebranded Mainline, was sold in a management buyout. A 20% stake in the company was divested to FirstBus from the Stagecoach Group in 1995, and eventually in 1998, First purchased Mainline, later rebranding the operation to First South Yorkshire.

== History ==
The South Yorkshire Passenger Transport Executive (SYPTE) was formed in 1974 under the provisions of the Local Government Act 1972, and until 1986, ran a majority of bus services in South Yorkshire. In 1986, bus services were deregulated following the passage of the Transport Act 1985, with local authorities in the United Kingdom required to sell the operations of their passenger transport executives (PTEs) to private companies. South Yorkshire PTE was rebranded to 'South Yorkshire Transport' (stylised as South Yorkshire's Transport) shortly before deregulation, with a large red band and smaller red and brown stripes being applied onto buses in the existing brown and cream livery, as well as new 'SYT' logos replacing the PTE's 'flying duck' logo on all company property.

In the months prior to deregulation, fare increases of up to 300% were enacted and staff redundancies across the company were carried out in order to cover running costs commercially. This included the withdrawal or conversion of conductor operated buses to one-person operation by 1986, which saw conductors either trained to become drivers or be made redundant from the company.

On 26 October 1986, deregulation went into effect, and South Yorkshire Transport, now established as an 'arm's-length' operator by the local authority, began operations. However, the company was not sold into privatisation immediately following deregulation, causing South Yorkshire to become the first former PTE to be issued an ultimatum to privatise or be broken up by the Department of Transport in 1989. South Yorkshire Transport was eventually sold in a management buyout in November 1993, following the relaxing of another ultimatum which stipulated that operators must be sold by the end of the year to retain the complete proceeds of their sale.

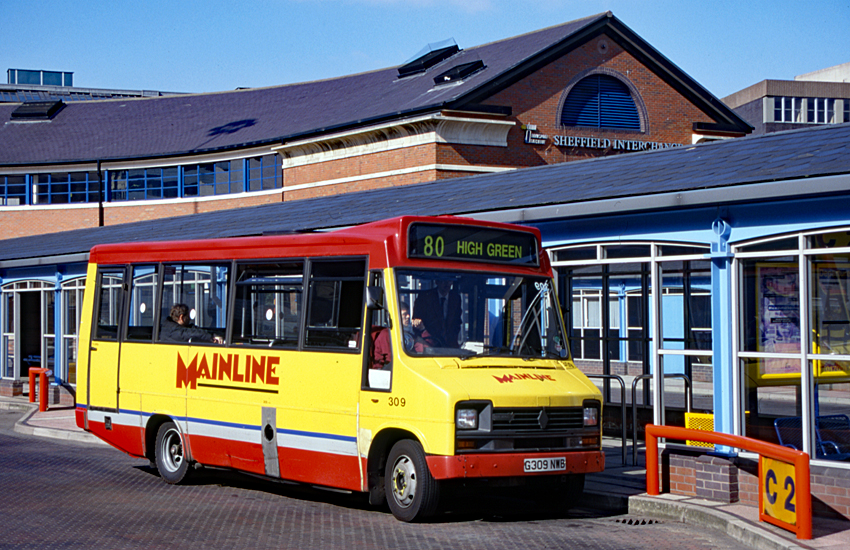
Mainline Renault 50 midibus at Sheffield Interchange

Throughout the late-1980s and early-1990s, South Yorkshire Transport faced serious competition from a number of independent operators and group subsidiaries in and around Sheffield. The most notorious of these included Sheffield Omnibus, Andrews and Yorkshire Terrier, which was founded by former SYT employees. Like many post-deregulation operators at the time, South Yorkshire Transport promptly began to operate midibuses in competition with these other independents in 1988, known as the 'Eager Beaver' and 'Little Nipper' services, initially operated using a mixed fleet of new and former Lincoln City Transport Reeve Burgess Beaver-bodied Renault 50 series minibuses. 240 of these Reeve Burgess/Dodge midibuses were acquired for these competing routes between 1987 and 1991 by South Yorkshire Transport. At its peak in 1992, 13 operators were running competing services in and around Sheffield, with up to 350 buses an hour entering the city centre.

South Yorkshire Transport eventually went on to acquire the business of some of their competitors, including Sheffield United Tours (SUT) and Sheafline, who subsequently became a merged subsidiary of the company following an aborted attempt three years prior before eventually having their operations absorbed into SYT. South Yorkshire's acquisitions, creating an operating area of 1.65% of the United Kingdom, had previously attracted the attention of the Office of Fair Trading and the Monopolies and Mergers Commission, with the company being referred to the House of Lords and the mergers of both SUT and Sheaf Line being ruled as against the public interest at the time.

However, competition between Andrews, Sheffield Omnibus and Yorkshire Terrier still remained. Yorkshire Terrier and Andrews was later purchased by Yorkshire Traction, who themselves were eventually purchased by the Stagecoach Group to become Stagecoach Yorkshire. Sheffield Omnibus, meanwhile, competed independently until 1995, managing to purchase fleets of Alexander PS types on Volvo chassis and Alexander-bodied Leyland Olympians on lease before it was merged into the Traction Group with Andrews.

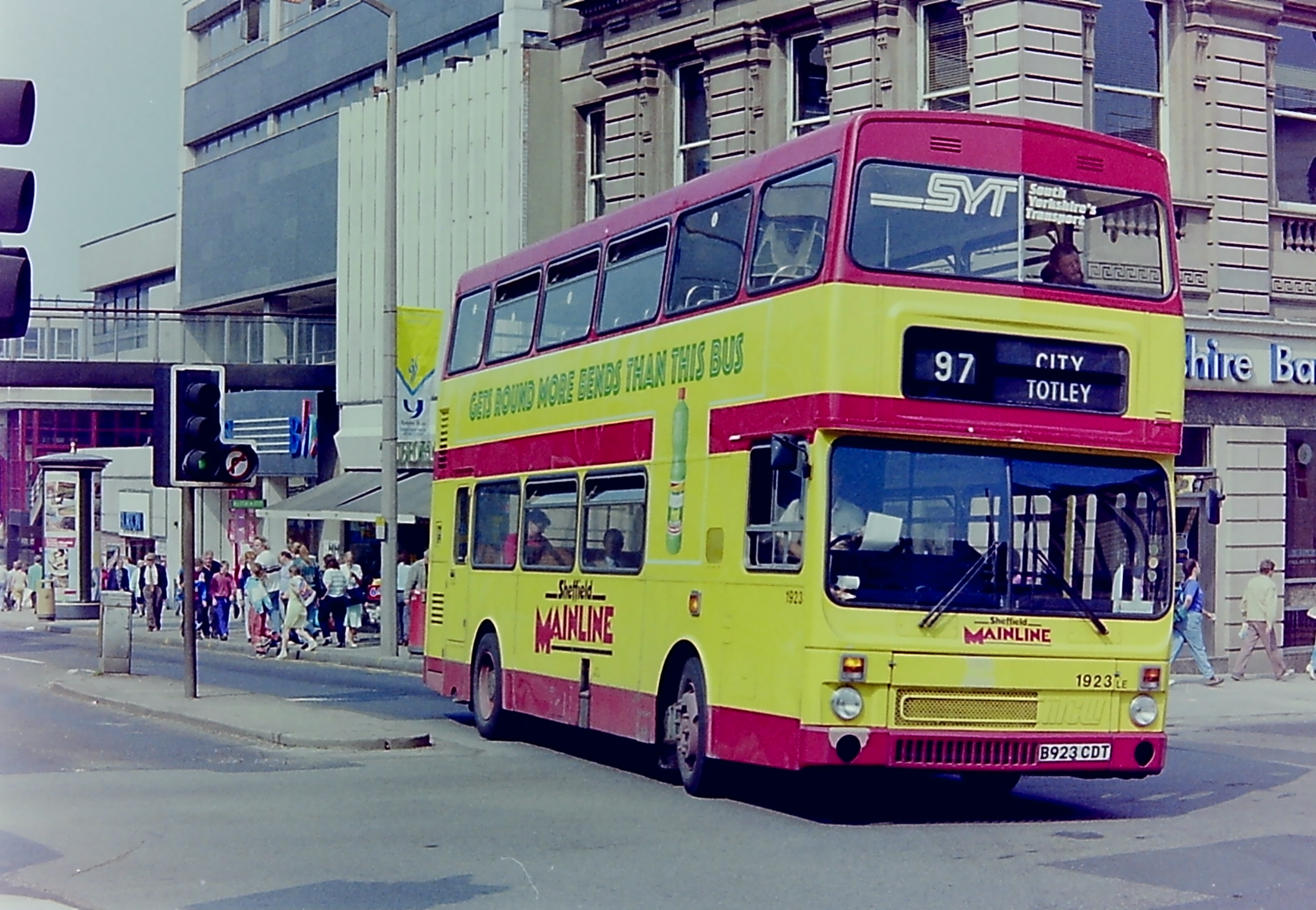
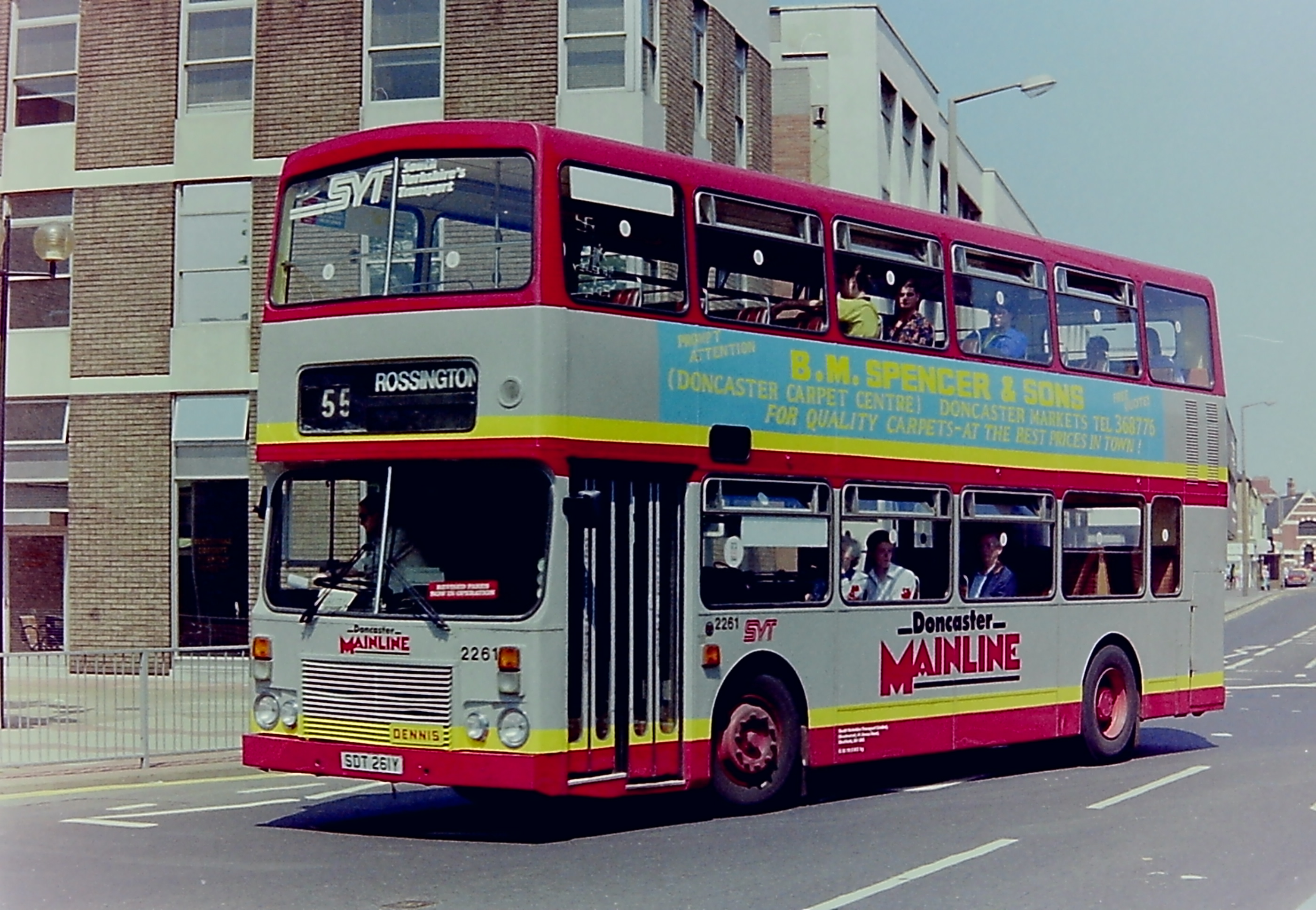
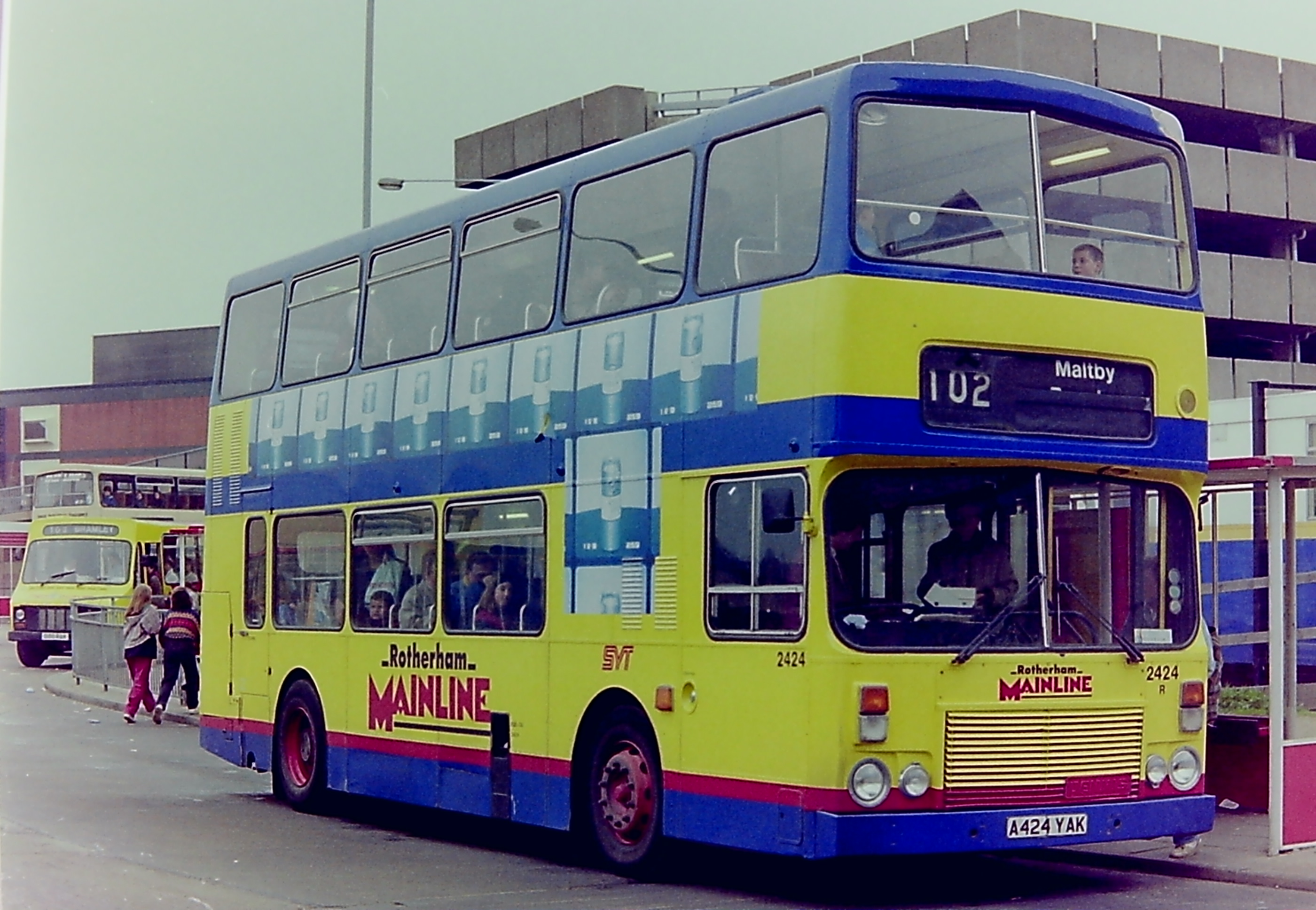
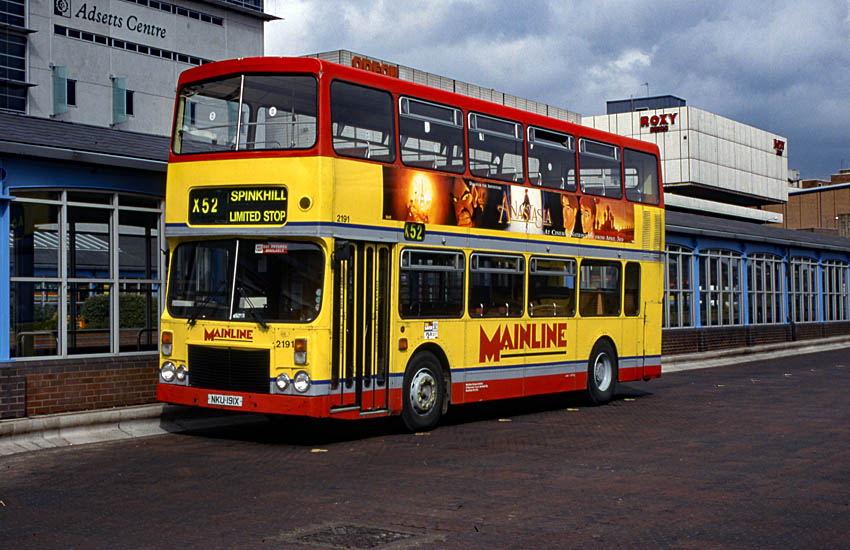
Clockwise from top left: Dennis Dominators and an MCW Metrobus in the liveries of Sheffield Mainline, Doncaster Mainline, Rotherham Mainline and the merged Mainline livery

South Yorkshire Transport began the process of branding its operations to 'Mainline' in June 1989, adopting a predominantly yellow livery with regional identifiers for its Sheffield, Doncaster and Rotherham divisions initially as route branding. These regional identifiers were then dropped in 1992 and the Mainline name was adopted across the company in a £750,000 (equivalent to £1,655,000 in 2025) pre-privatisation publicity drive, with a new red and yellow livery combining the blue and silver elements of the Doncaster and Rotherham liveries being introduced to the bus fleet. On 7 June 1993, prior to South Yorkshire Transport's sale into privatisation, the company was renamed 'Mainline Group Ltd'.

Mainline was eventually sold to FirstBus in 1998. The Stagecoach Group had purchased a 20% stake in the company in 1995, however the Office of Fair Trading ordered this stake to be divested from the group in January 1996. The 20% stake was acquired by FirstBus, who would later purchase the entirety of the company for £29.7 million (equivalent to £57,649,000 in 2025) in 1998. By 2000, a new group livery was introduced and the company was renamed First South Yorkshire, phasing out both the Mainline name and livery.

== Operations ==
=== Doncaster ===
Buses in Doncaster were based at two garages in the borough. The main depot was the former Doncaster Corporation garage on Leicester Avenue, close to Doncaster Racecourse, where an experimental trolleybus had been previously trialled before deregulation. A second, smaller garage was located on Bootham Lane in Dunscroft.

In the 1980s, a new workshop building was erected at the rear of the yard behind the Leicester Avenue garage. In the early 1990s, the main depot building was demolished and the land was sold. This made way for a new Wickes DIY store. The new workshop, yard and a small section of the old garage building, which contained a bus-wash facility, remained.

=== Rotherham ===
Buses in Rotherham were based at a large garage on Midland Road, which was also home to the central engineering works of South Yorkshire Transport. In 1992, the Midland Road works were contracted to refurbish 220 of London Buses' AEC Routemasters with new drivelines and interiors. Following the sale of the company to FirstBus, the Midland Road works were retained and later repurposed as the FirstGroup's Commercial Unit for the repainting and refurbishment of the group's buses. The Midland Road garage and FirstGroup's Commercial Unit closed in 2017, with demolition of the Midland Road site commencing in 2023 following the site's use as an armed police training facility and a COVID-19 mass testing centre.

Midland Road garage was also latterly home to Coachline, South Yorkshire Transport's coaching operation, which was initially founded by SYPTE in the 1980s at Leadmill Road garage through merging the PTE's multiple coach operating licences. After deregulation, Coachline expanded with the acquisitions of SUT and Sheaf Line, moving to the former's Charlotte Road garage before moving eventually back to Leadmill Road in 1993 amid Mainline's rationalisation of the merged subsidiary. In May 1996, Coachline, by then having moved to Midland Road, was sold to former Scancoaches managing director Glen Harrison and former Yorkshire Traction depot manager Alan Draisey. A new company named South Yorkshire Coachline Ltd was formed, operating from a section of Midland Road garage until the company entered receivership.

=== Sheffield ===
Buses in Sheffield were initially operated from five garages; East Bank, Greenland Road, Halfway, Herries Road and Leadmill, with the latter two closed by Mainline in 1994. East Bank garage was also closed in 1994, however it was reopened later in 1994 and renamed Olive Grove.

=== Ipswich ===
A newly privatised Mainline had planned to operate services in Ipswich in competition with local municipal bus operator Ipswich Buses in 1994. Ten Volvo B6s with Plaxton Pointer bodywork were purchased and planned to operate on routes run by Ipswich Buses to compete for passengers, intended to be based at a Volvo commercial dealership. However, Mainline soon decided not to commence services and pulled out of Ipswich, selling their operations and the ten Volvo B6s to Eastern Counties.

== Fleet ==
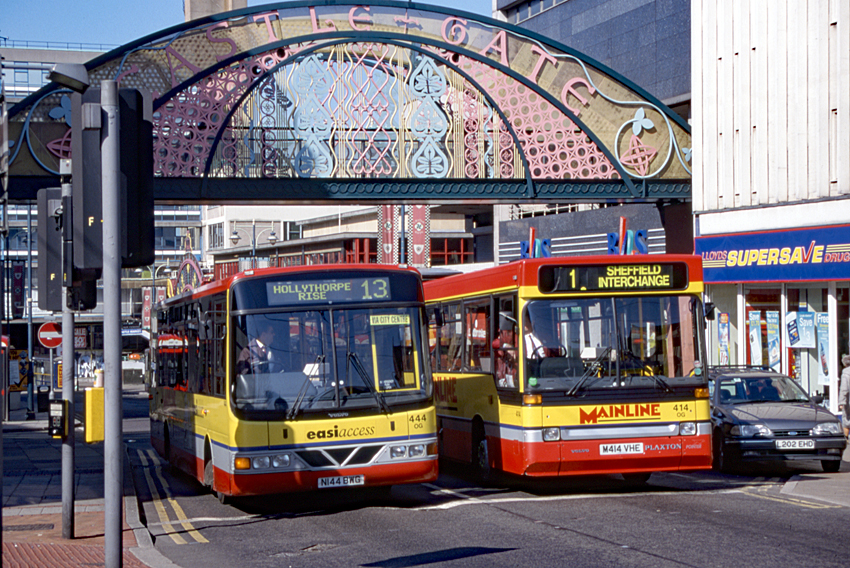
Mainline Volvo B6s at Castlegate, Sheffield

An initial fleet of over 1,000 buses, including 321 Dennis Dominators, 274 Leyland Atlanteans and 176 Daimler Fleetlines, 170 MCW Metrobuses, as well as some Volvo Ailsas, Leyland Nationals and Leyland-DAB articulated buses were inherited from SYPTE. By the time of First's purchase of the company in 1998, this had been reduced to over 700 buses.

Prior to the acquisition of Mainline by FirstBus, the company had amassed a total of 180 Volvo B10M single-deck buses with Alexander PS type bodywork from 1990 to 1996. These were initially acquired to lower running costs and reduce vandalism, and by 1996, Mainline were the second-largest operator of the type in the United Kingdom, with only the Stagecoach Group operating more nationwide. Following comparative trials against a Dennis Dart with Northern Counties Paladin bodywork two years prior, Mainline also purchased 35 Volvo B6s with Plaxton Pointer bodywork, as well as a further 10 for the cancelled Ipswich operation.

The company acquired its first low-floor buses in January 1996, progressively entering service in the fleet throughout the year. These were eleven Wright Crusaders on the Volvo B6LE chassis. All but two of these were branded 'easiaccess' buses and entered service on services connecting Sheffield city centre with Hillsborough. The latter two were branded for Goole town services contracted to Mainline by Humberside County Council.

== See also ==
- South Yorkshire Passenger Transport Executive
- First South Yorkshire
- South Yorkshire Transport Museum
