= Avon Buses =

Bus operator in Merseyside and Cheshire, England

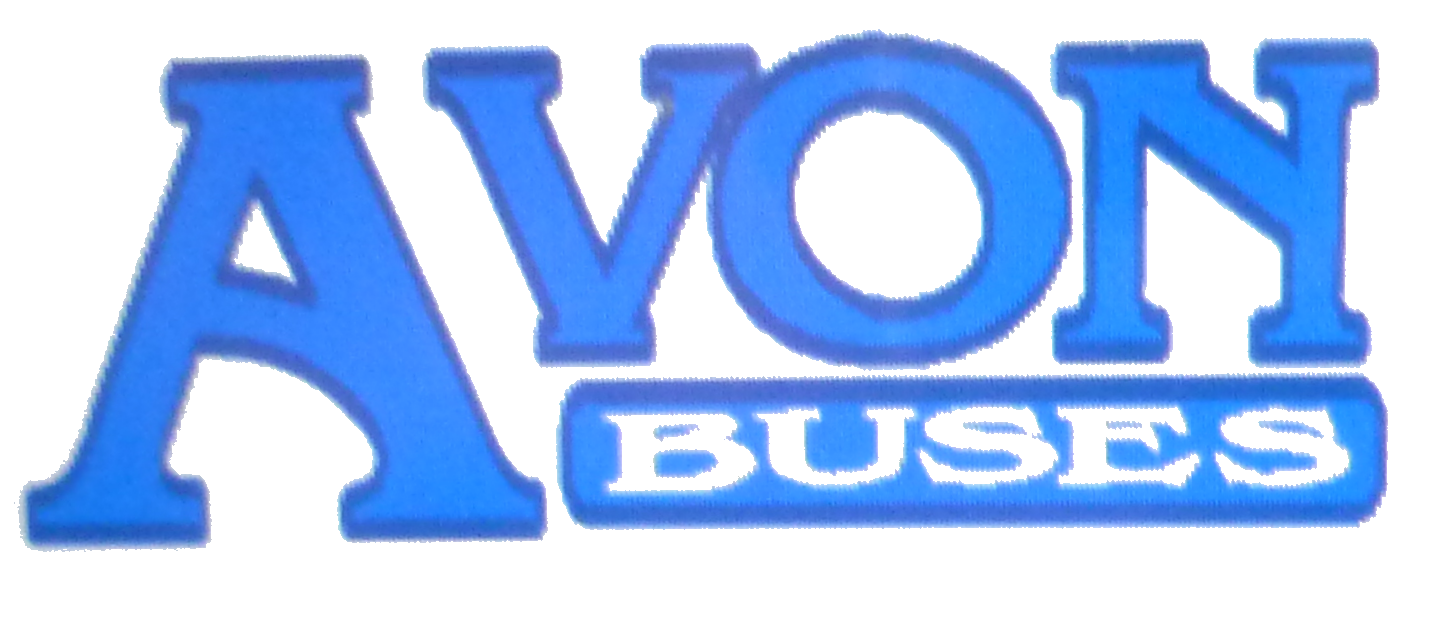

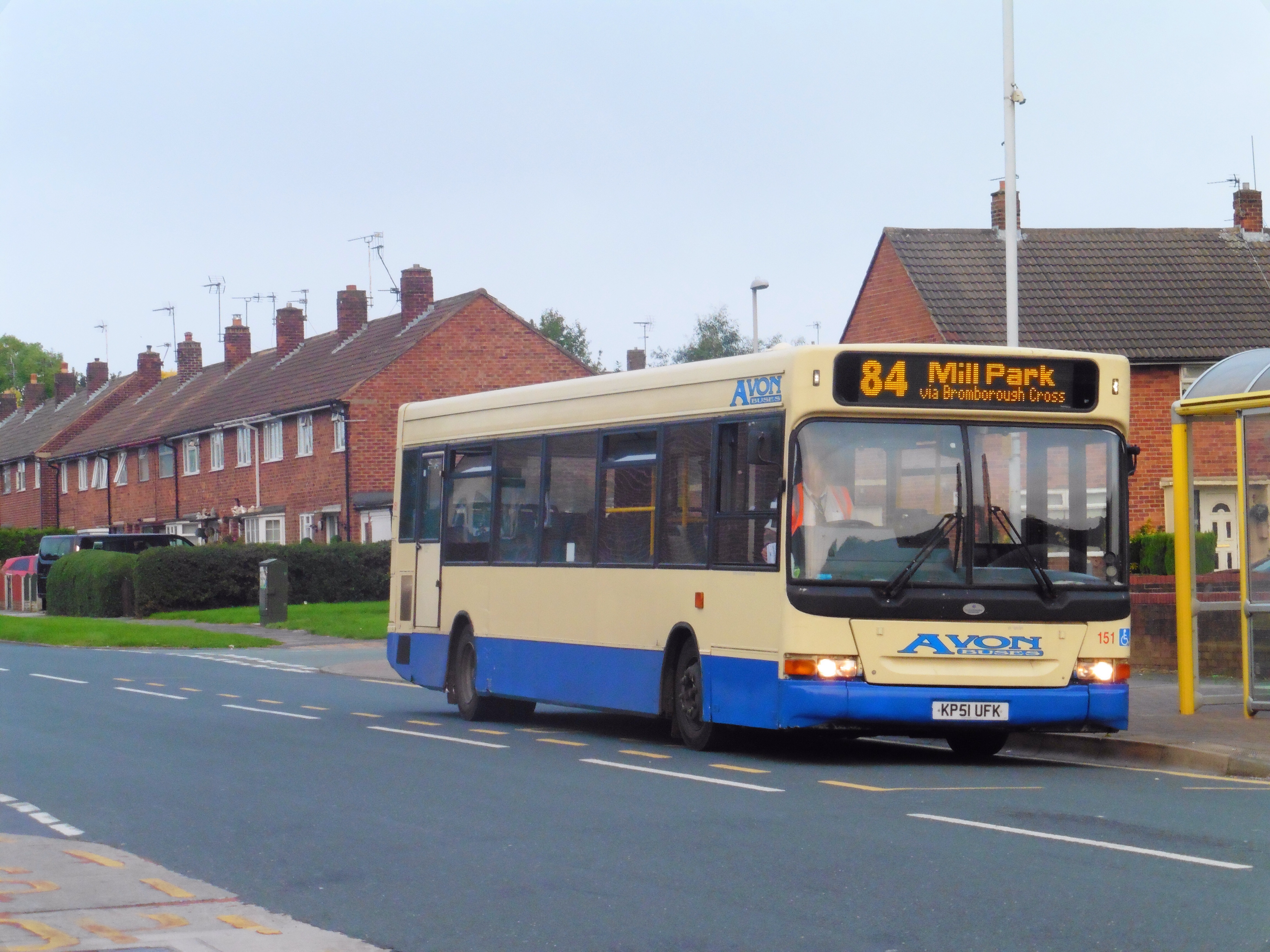
- Plaxton Pointer 2 bodied Dennis Dart SLF at Mill Park in September 2016
- Parent: Larry Smith
- Founded: August 1981
- Defunct: 5 October 2018
- Headquarters: Prenton
- Service area: Merseyside; Cheshire
- Service type: Bus services
- Hubs: West Kirby; Birkenhead; Arrowe Park Hospital; Heswall; Chester; Crosby; Clatterbridge Hospital
- Fleet: 41 (February 2017)

Avon Buses was a bus operator based in Prenton providing services in Merseyside and Cheshire, England.

== History ==
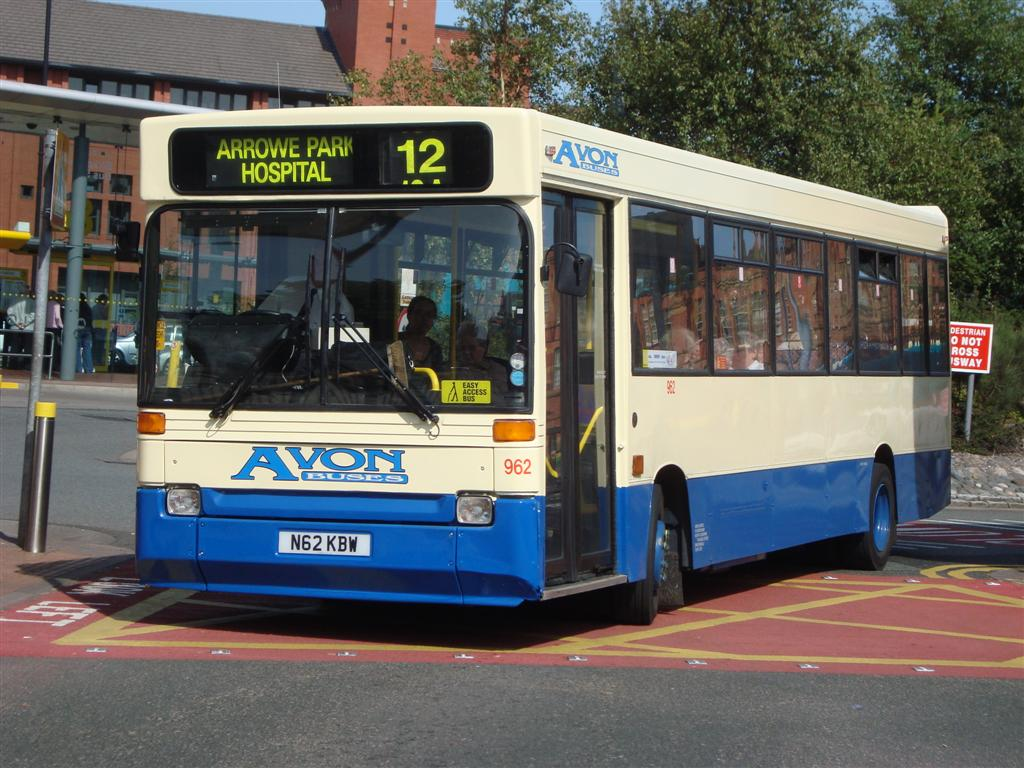
Plaxton Pointer bodied Dennis Dart in Birkenhead in September 2009

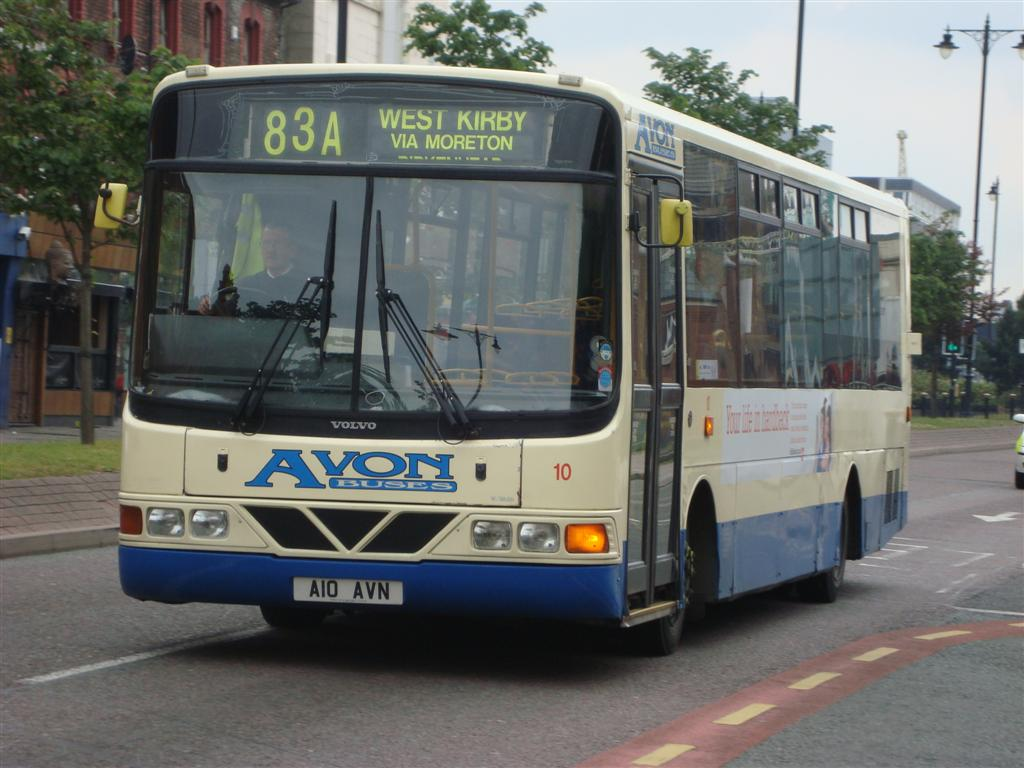
Wright Crusader bodied Volvo B6LE in Birkenhead in June 2009

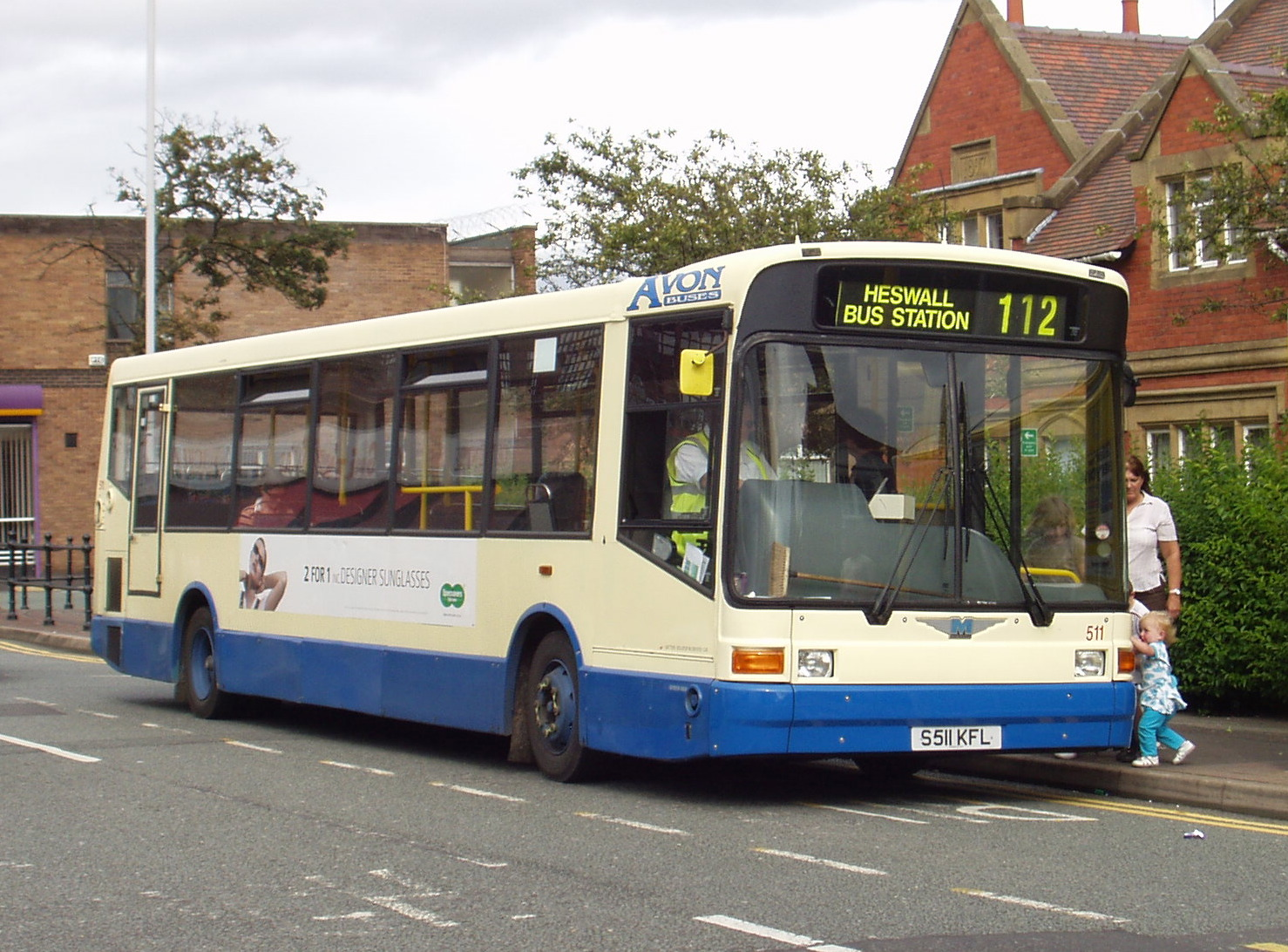
Marshall Capital bodied Dennis Dart SLF in Bebington in August 2007

Avon Minis, as the company was originally known, was founded in August 1981 by Larry Smith. By 1995 it had six buses and ran mostly school contracts plus one local route. The newest buses were two Leyland Titans.

The company expanded with services starting in Crosby, Fazakerley and a former outstation in Bootle. The business was renamed Avon Buses in 2004/05.

Avon Buses took over former Arriva North West routes 421 and 422, renumbering them to 22 and 22A. Avon then decided to renumber service 22A to 24 so it would not be confused with Helms Coaches service 23. They also took over five other groups of routes at the same time. After the Helms Coaches service was withdrawn, Avon Buses decided not to raise the frequency of routes 22 and 24 but add an additional Sunday 23 service from Heswall to Chester Bus Exchange, which was withdrawn in April 2011.

In October 2013 Avon took on eight routes from Impera Bus & Coach after Impera ceased to trade.

29 June 2014 saw the end of two commercial Avon routes, (Route 40/40A Saughall Massie - Mill Park) & (Route 80 Woodside - Arrowe Park Hospital) It also saw the end of Merseytravel routes 197 & 213

On 6 July 2014 Avon took over Cumfybus's daytime 135 and 235 service between Bootle and Aintree.

On 10 August 2014 Avon took over Merseytravel services 144/145 from Peoplesbus running between Litherland and Bootle. Two morning and two afternoon services started and finished at Arrowe Park Hospital, numbered 143.

In September 2014 the 22 was withdrawn and replaced by Stagecoach X22 running between Heswall bus station and Chester, avoiding Williston.

From 8 December 2014, some of the longer Avon routes were split up, interworked with one other. Routes 86/87 were cut back to Heswall, whilst the section of route between Heswall and West Kirby was renumbered 88. Routes 77/77A were also cut back to Heswall, with the section of route between Heswall and West Kirby becoming the 82/82A. This had also happened before in August 2012 when routes 12 and 12A were split to become 12 and 93: the route remained unchanged with through journeys still possible.

On 1 September 2015 a new timetable was introduced on many routes and the 22 returned to its pre-September 2012 route.

On 5 September 2016 many of Avon's services were re-routed, cut or new destinations added. The 22 was extended from West Kirby to Moreton Cross and significantly rerouted to serve Newton, Greasby, Arrowe Park Hospital and Pensby. The 83 became a three buses a day service in each direction between Prenton and Liverpool.

== Fleet ==
As of August 2018 the fleet consisted of about 35 buses.

The bulk of the fleet at the end consisted of Dennis Dart SLF and Alexander Dennis Enviro 200 Darts chassis with Caetano Nimbus, MCV Evolution and Plaxton Pointer 2 bodywork. September 2017 saw two former First Essex and Great Yarmouth ALX400 buses joined the fleet doing most School runs and some bus routes usually Monday-Friday

The initial Avon Buses livery was a dark blue with cream. In 1993 the livery became predominantly cream with blue stripes lined in gold. In 1998 the livery evolved again into cream with a blue skirt and black around the windows. A new livery was introduced 2016 with the arrival of five short Enviro200 buses. This livery was white with a blue skirt with the blue raising to the roof towards the rear, broken with a cream sash.

There were very few exceptions to the Avon livery although during the 1990s, some coaches operated in a red livery branded 'Avon Executive' and a Leyland National Greenway carried a Merseytravel livery of yellow, white and black as a dedicated bus for a contract between Heswall and West Kirby.

2017 saw Avon expand operations in the Liverpool area but a driver and vehicle shortage led to many service cancellations and the company at late June 2017 was in a state of crisis with most Merseytravel tendered and commercial services not running. However the crisis appeared to have been resolved by the end of June with most scheduled services running, but during July services were regularly cancelled again. Late August 2017 saw the company's fortunes improve.

== Closure ==
On 5 October 2018, drivers were told that the firm was to cease trading immediately. Issues cited for the closure included rising insurance and fuel costs, and Merseytravel's MyTicket, a youth ticket that provided unlimited travel for £2 a day. The use of MyTicket led cash-bought tickets on buses to decrease. Following the closure, Arriva North West would provide limited services for services 10, 10A and 83A.

Stagecoach Merseyside & South Lancashire began running the 22/X22 beginning on 8 October 2018. From 5 November 2018 Stagecoach took over the 16/17 and 80/82 and Eazibus were given the contract to run a new route called the 73.
