= Plaxton Pointer =

Single-deck midibus body on Dennis and Volvo chassis

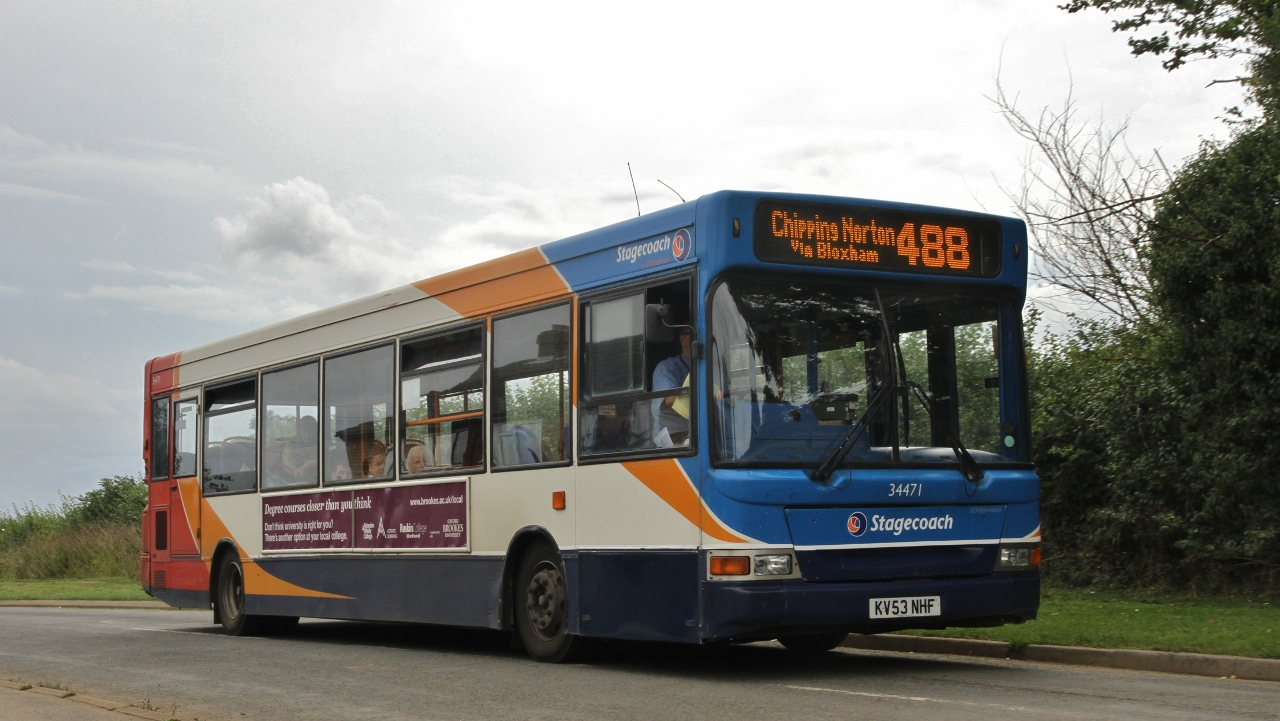
- Stagecoach in Oxfordshire Plaxton Pointer 2 bodied Dennis Dart SLF in Milcombe in August 2015

Overview
- Manufacturer: Reeve Burgess; Plaxton; TransBus; Alexander Dennis
- Production: 1991–2006
- Assembly: Scarborough, North Yorkshire, England
- Designer: Pointer 1; Capoco Design; Pointer 2; Ogle Design

Body and chassis
- Doors: 1 or 2
- Floor type: Step entrance/Low-floor (SLF)
- Chassis: Pointer (Step entrance): Dennis Dart; Volvo B6; Pointer (Low floor): Dennis Dart SLF; Volvo B6LE; Pointer 2 (Low floor): Dennis Dart SLF; Blue Bird LFCC9

Powertrain
- Engine: Cummins B Series (Dennis Dart); Cummins B Series/ISBe (Dennis Dart SLF); Volvo TD63 (Volvo B6); Volvo TD63/D6A (Volvo B6LE)
- Capacity: 44-62 (29-41 seated)

Dimensions
- Length: 8.5–11.3 metres (28–37 ft)
- Width: 2.3–2.4 metres (7 ft 7 in – 7 ft 10 in)

Chronology
- Successor: Alexander Dennis Enviro200

The Plaxton Pointer (originally known as the Reeve Burgess Pointer, and later as the TransBus Pointer and Alexander Dennis Pointer) is a single-deck midibus body that was manufactured between 1991 and 2006, predominantly on the Dennis Dart chassis, by Reeve Burgess, Plaxton and latterly Alexander Dennis.

== History ==
=== Pointer 1 ===
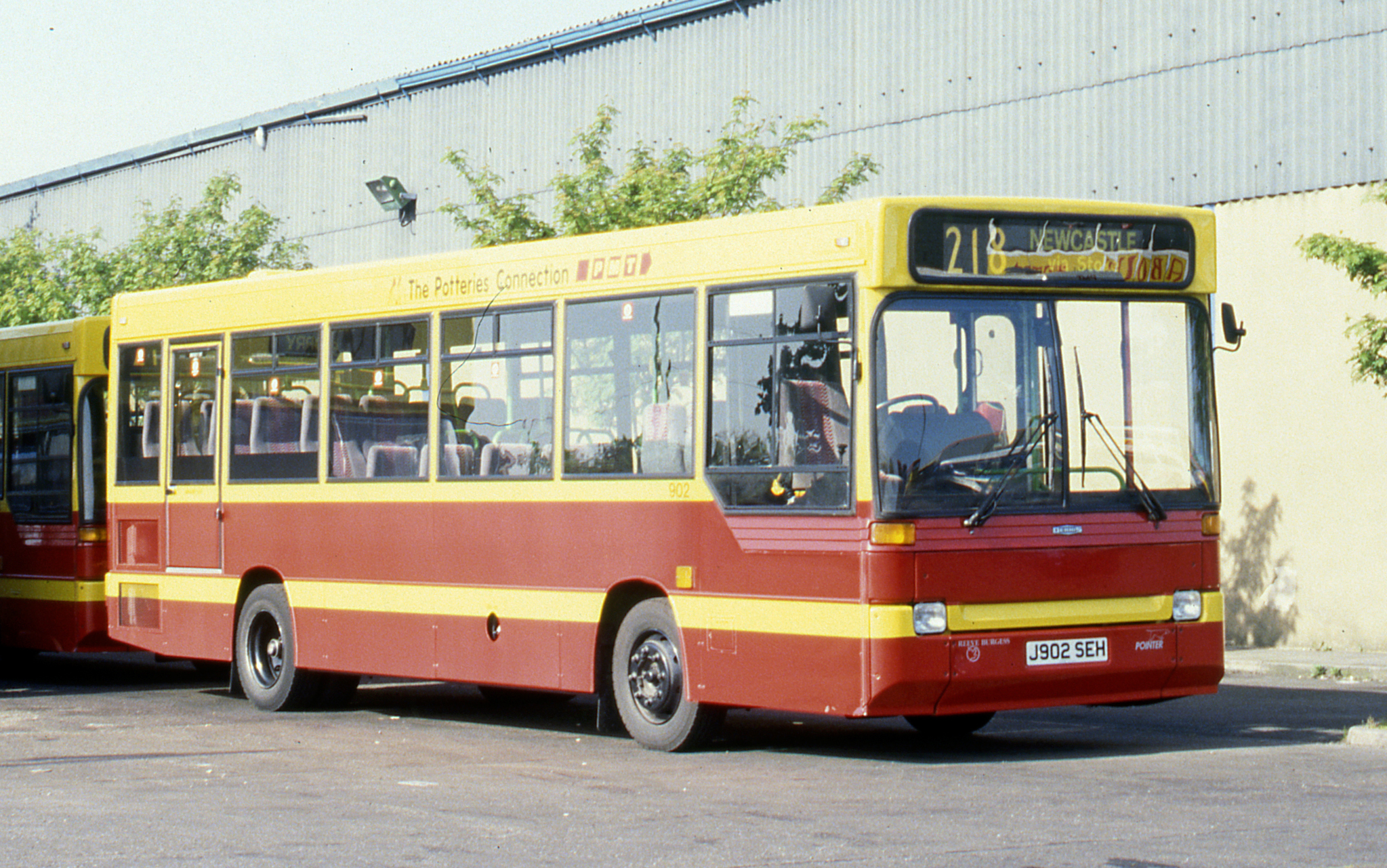
PMT Reeve Burgess Pointer bodied Dennis Dart in Newcastle-under-Lyme, 1992

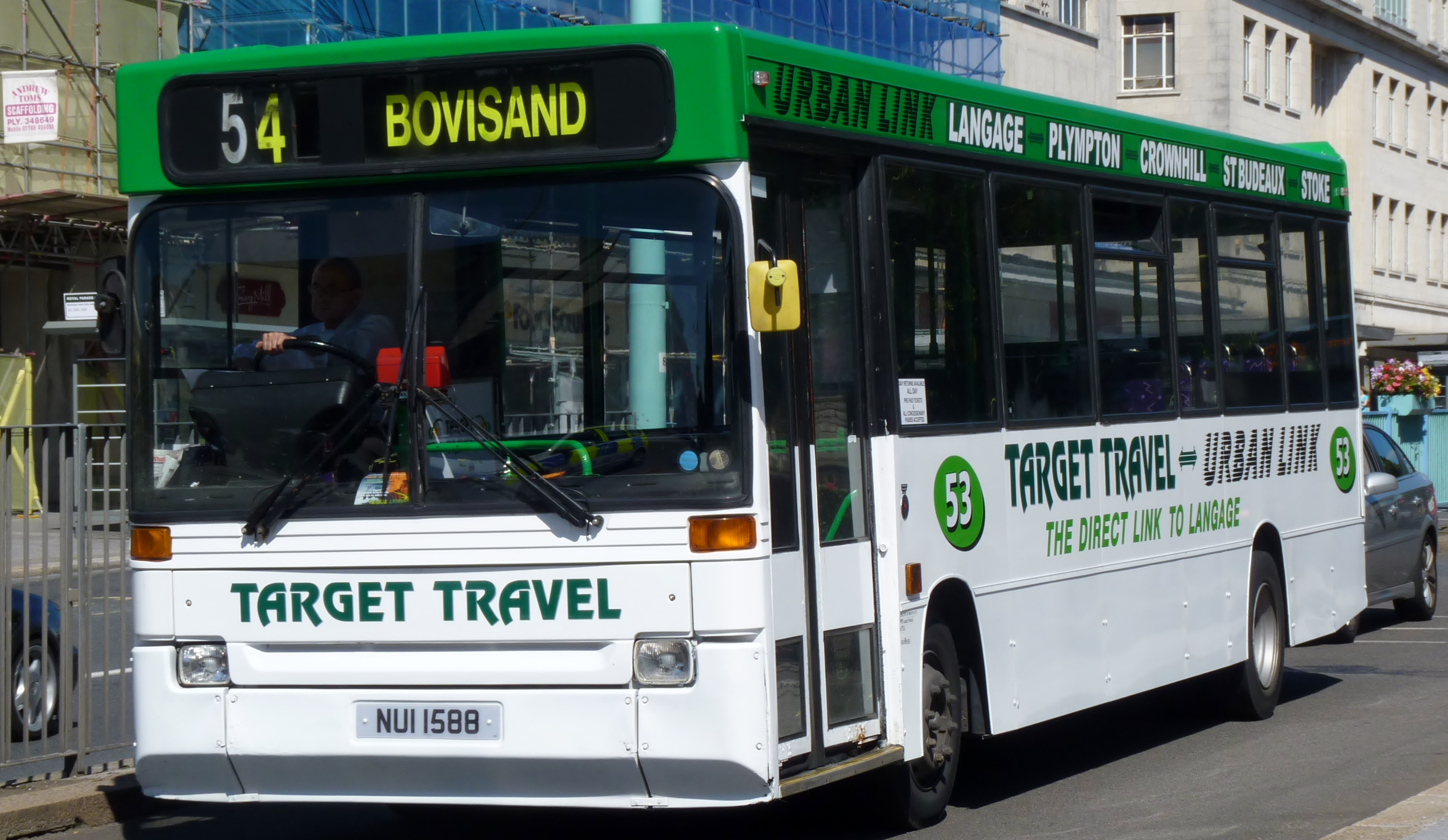
Target Travel high-floor Plaxton Pointer 1 bodied Dennis Dart in Plymouth in July 2010

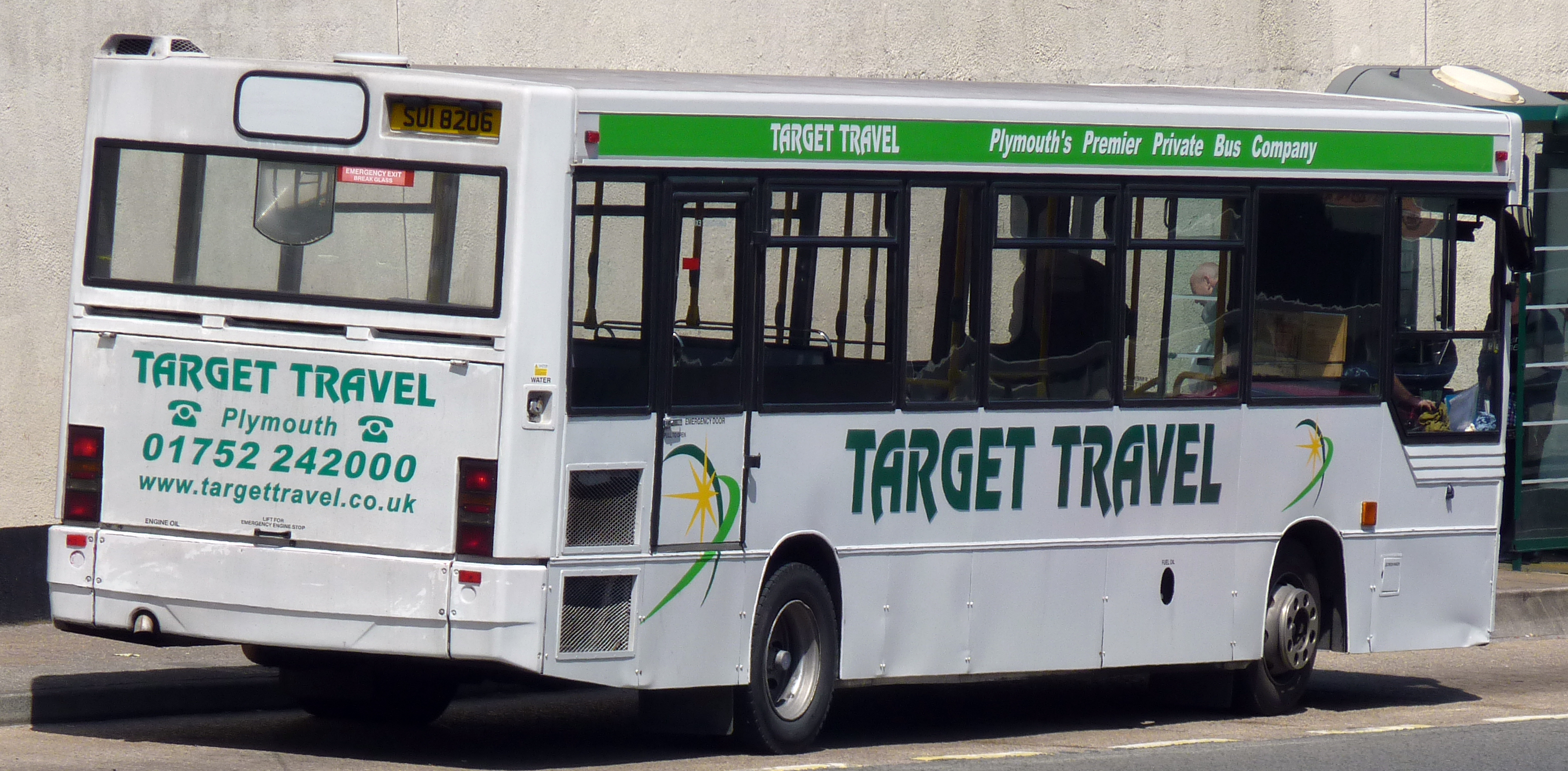
Rear of Target Travel Plaxton Pointer bodied Dennis Dart

The Dennis Dart midibus chassis was launched in 1988, two years after the deregulation of the British bus industry, aimed at operators wanting to move away from van-based minibuses. Initially, the Dart chassis was only offered with Duple Dartline bodywork, however by 1991, Dennis had opened the Dart up to be bodied by other manufacturers, including Wadham Stringer and Wrights of Ballymena.

Plaxton, through its Reeve Burgess subsidiary, launched its Pointer bodywork in 1991 for the 8.5 metres (28 ft) Dennis Dart chassis, designed by Capoco Design. Reusing aluminium extrusions from previous Reeve Burgess minibuses, the Pointer was assembled with a combination of an aluminium frame, as opposed to steel, and glass fibre mouldings, projected by Plaxton to give the body a 12 to 15-year design life. The front of the Pointer featured a two-piece split windscreen with a full-size destination display above, and the interior, fitted out to the recommendations of the Disabled Persons Transport Advisory Committee (DiPTAC), featured an optional split step entrance and a gradual series of steps towards the back of the bus, capable of holding a capacity of 39 seated and 15 standing passengers. Pointer bodies on longer 9 metres (30 ft) and 9.8 metres (32 ft) Dart chassis were later introduced by the end of 1990.

At 2.3 metres (7 ft 7 in) metres wide, the Pointer-bodied Dart immediately proved popular with bus operators large and small across the United Kingdom, with Southampton Citybus taking delivery of the first example and London Regional Transport ordering 52 Pointer-bodied Darts for its subsidiaries upon the body's launch. Although a handful of Pointer Darts were built by Reeve Burgess in their Derbyshire factory, production of the Pointer mainly took place at Plaxton's Scarborough factory due to demand outstripping Reeve Burgess' manufacturing capacity. Eventually, the Reeve Burgess nameplate was dropped, with the bus being sold as the Plaxton Pointer.

The Plaxton Pointer was also sold on the Volvo B6 chassis, launched in the United Kingdom market in 1992. This body and chassis combination did not prove as popular as the Pointer on Dart chassis, however the Pointer-bodied B6 was received well by some UK bus operators, including Mainline Buses.

==== 1995 facelift ====
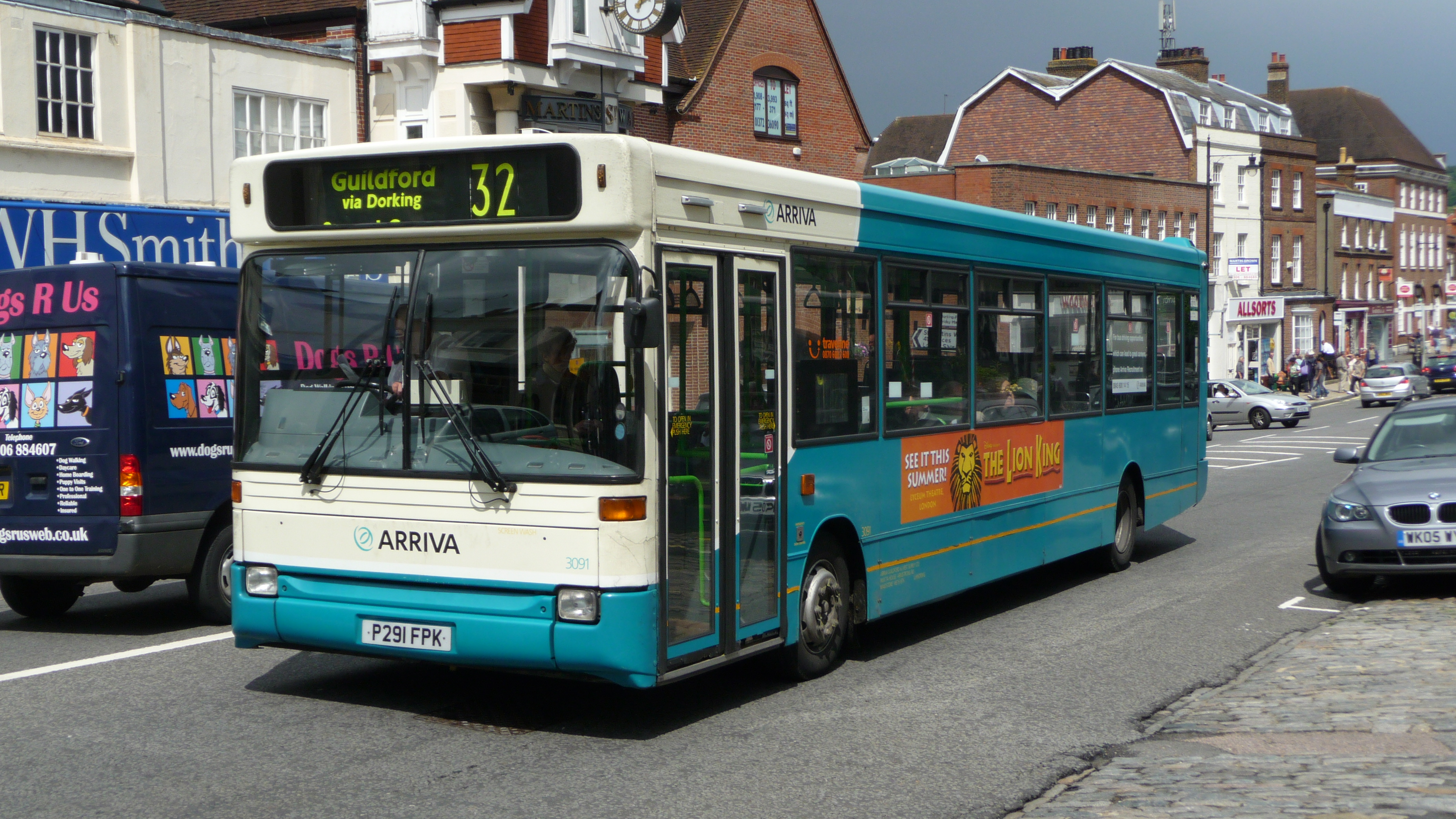
Arriva Guildford & West Surrey Plaxton Pointer 1 bodied Dennis Dart SLF in Dorking in July 2009

The introduction of the Super Low Floor (SLF) version of the Dennis Dart in 1995, followed by the launch of the Volvo B6LE, saw the Pointer body receive a facelift, being widened to 2.4 metres (7 ft 10 in) and having the split-step entrance replaced with a step-free entrance featuring an electric wheelchair ramp. The facelifted Pointer 1 was aimed to be more curved than its predecessor, receiving a rounded roof dome and double-curvature windscreen, as well as having the headlights moved lower down the front panel. The first examples were delivered to CentreWest Buses following its launch at the Coach & Bus '95 expo, with FirstBus also immediately ordering of 70 examples for its subsidiaries.

==== Exports ====
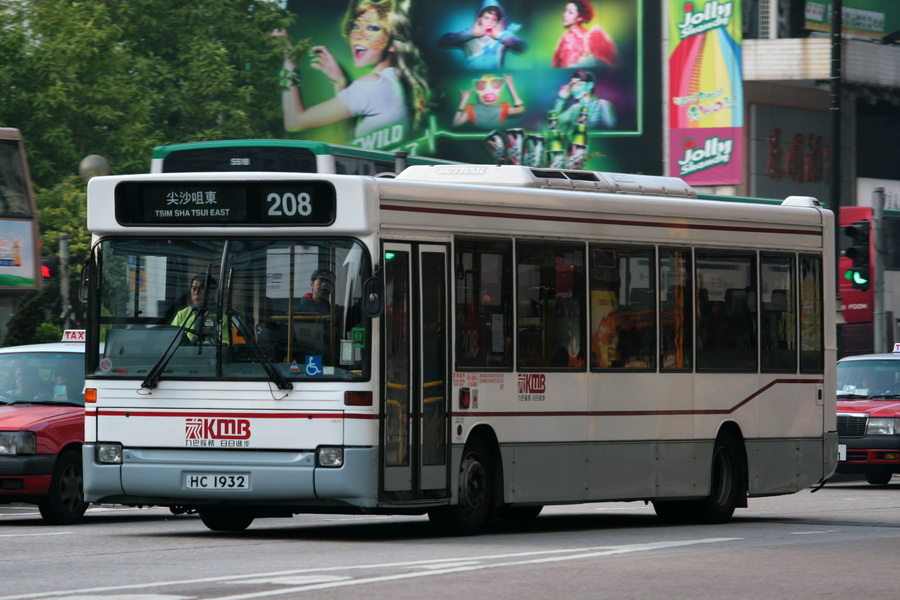
Kowloon Motor Bus Plaxton Pointer 1 bodied Dennis Dart SLF in January 2012

The first-generation Plaxton Pointer on Dennis and Volvo chassis received a number of export orders to some right-hand drive markets. In Hong Kong, air-conditioned Pointers proved highly popular with Citybus, taking delivery of 21 step-entrance Darts and 15 Dart SLFs, as well as 20 on Volvo B6LE chassis. Kowloon Motor Bus, meanwhile, took delivery of two Pointers on Dart SLF chassis in 1996, followed by the delivery of a further ten in 1997, and Pointer bodied Dart SLFs were also delivered to Discovery Bay Transportation Services and New Lantao Bus during 1997.

Macau municipal bus operator Transmac, meanwhile, took delivery of 10 dual-doored Pointers on step-entrance Dart chassis in 1995, while two Pointer-bodied Dart SLFs with Eaton six-speed manual transmissions were delivered to Paramount Garage of Malta in 1997.

=== Pointer 2 ===
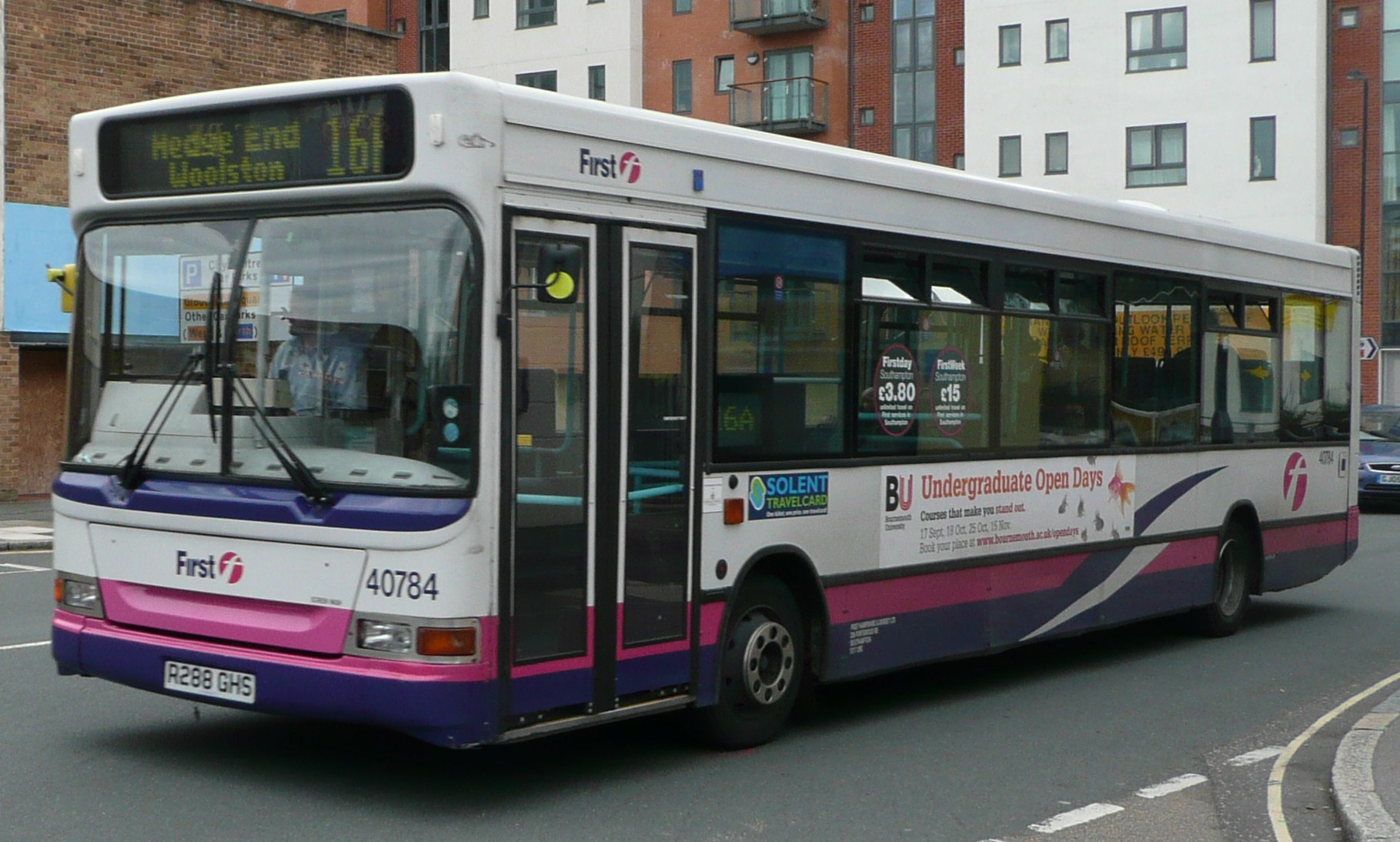
First Hampshire & Dorset Plaxton Pointer 2 bodied Dennis Dart SLF in Southampton in September 2008

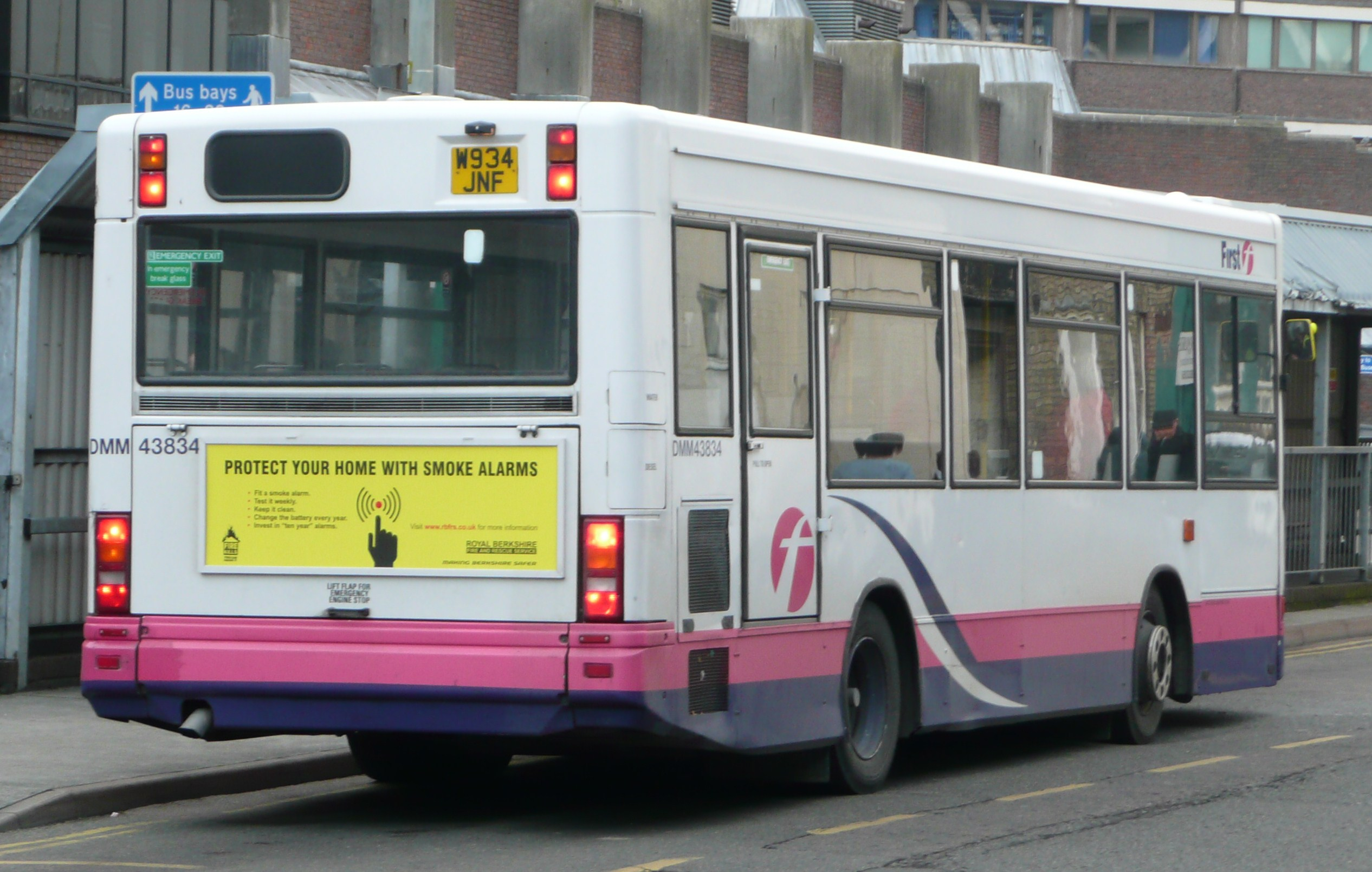
Rear of First Berkshire & The Thames Valley Plaxton Pointer 2 in Guildford in October 2008

In August 1997, Plaxton launched the Pointer 2, a complete redesign of the original Pointer bodywork on 9.3 metres (31 ft), 10.1 metres (33 ft), 10.7 metres (35 ft) Dennis Dart SLF chassis. Designed by Ogle Design, the Pointer 2 received a new, more rounded front end featuring a revised headlight arrangement, adding 100 millimetres (3.9 in) of length to the new body, although the split windscreen was maintained to be interchangeable with the Pointer 1. The rear of the bus featured a new set of brake and indicator lights placed towards the roofline, while the roof-mounted air intake was moved into the nearside upper rear panels, and the rear ventilation above the engine cover was replaced with a mesh grille. Double-glazed bonded windows were made available as an option, and black covers around the wheel arches were also introduced.

Made available for general purchase on the Dart SLF chassis from 1 January 1998, the first production examples of the Pointer 2 were delivered to FirstBus operators Bristol City Line, First Greater Manchester and Badgerline, with further orders upon being received by MTL North, Tellings-Golden Miller, Durham Travel Services, Metrobus and Metroline. The Pointer 2 also became the Stagecoach Group's standard low-floor single-deck midibus, with numerous examples delivered to Stagecoach subsidiaries across the United Kingdom, including a £5.6 million (equivalent to £9,903,000 in 2025) order for 75 in August 2005 as part of a major fleet replacement programme shortly after the group's purchase of Liverpool independent Glenvale Transport.

Shortly after launching the standard Pointer 2, Plaxton launched the longer "Super Pointer Dart" (SPD) body variant for the 11.3 metres (37 ft) Dart SLF chassis at the Coach & Bus '97 expo, seating 41 passengers and marketed by Plaxton to compete with other full-sized single-deck buses. The SPD Pointer was followed in 2000 by the "Mini Pointer Dart" (MPD) variant on the 8.8 metres (29 ft) chassis. A single Pointer 2 delivered to Arriva North East in 2003 was also built on an experimental Blue Bird LFCC9 chassis.

With the collapse of TransBus in 2004 and subsequent restructuring by the administrators, Plaxton and Alexander Dennis were sold to different parties. As Pointer production had been transferred to the former Alexander plant at Falkirk, it became an Alexander Dennis product. Plaxton, once again an independent company, signalled its return to the bus market by developing the Centro on VDL and MAN chassis in 2005 to join its Primo low-floor minibus in competition with the Pointer. The Pointer Dart was eventually discontinued following the launch of its successor, the Alexander Dennis Enviro200.

==== Concept 2000 ====
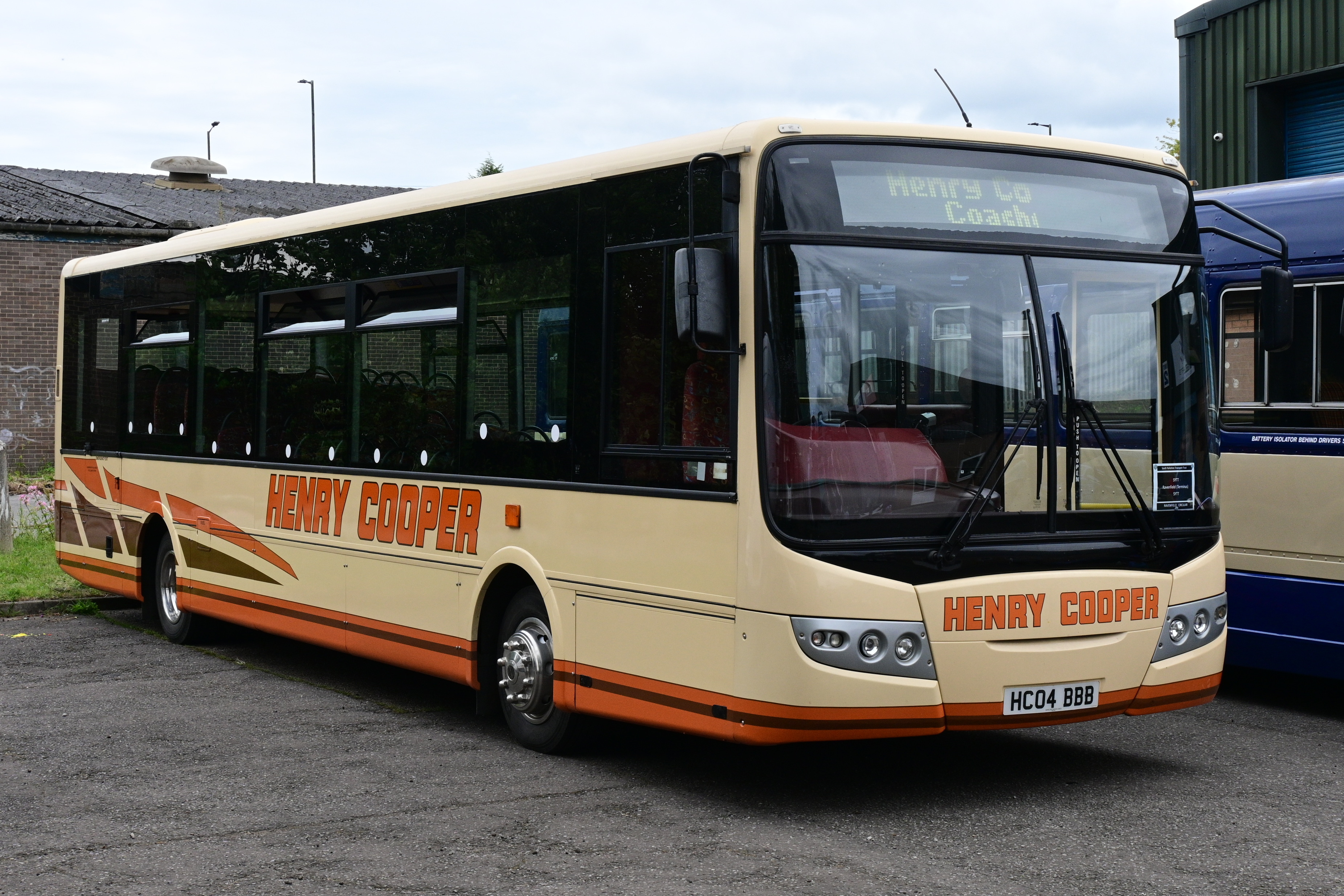
Preserved Plaxton Concept 2000 bodied Volvo B6BLE, one of two produced, in Rotherham in July 2024

In 1998, the Mayflower Group, owner of Alexander Coachbuilders, took over Dennis. The future of the Pointer at that time appeared uncertain as it was thought the Dart may be solely bodied by Alexander, and as a result, Plaxton built two Pointer bodies on the Volvo B6BLE chassis known as the Concept 2000. The project, however, was scrapped when Mayflower also purchased Plaxton, forming TransBus International. Certain design features of the scrapped Concept 2000 project have since been used on other designs, most notably the Alexander Dennis Enviro300, the Alexander Dennis Enviro500, and the Blue Bird UltraLF.

==== Exports ====
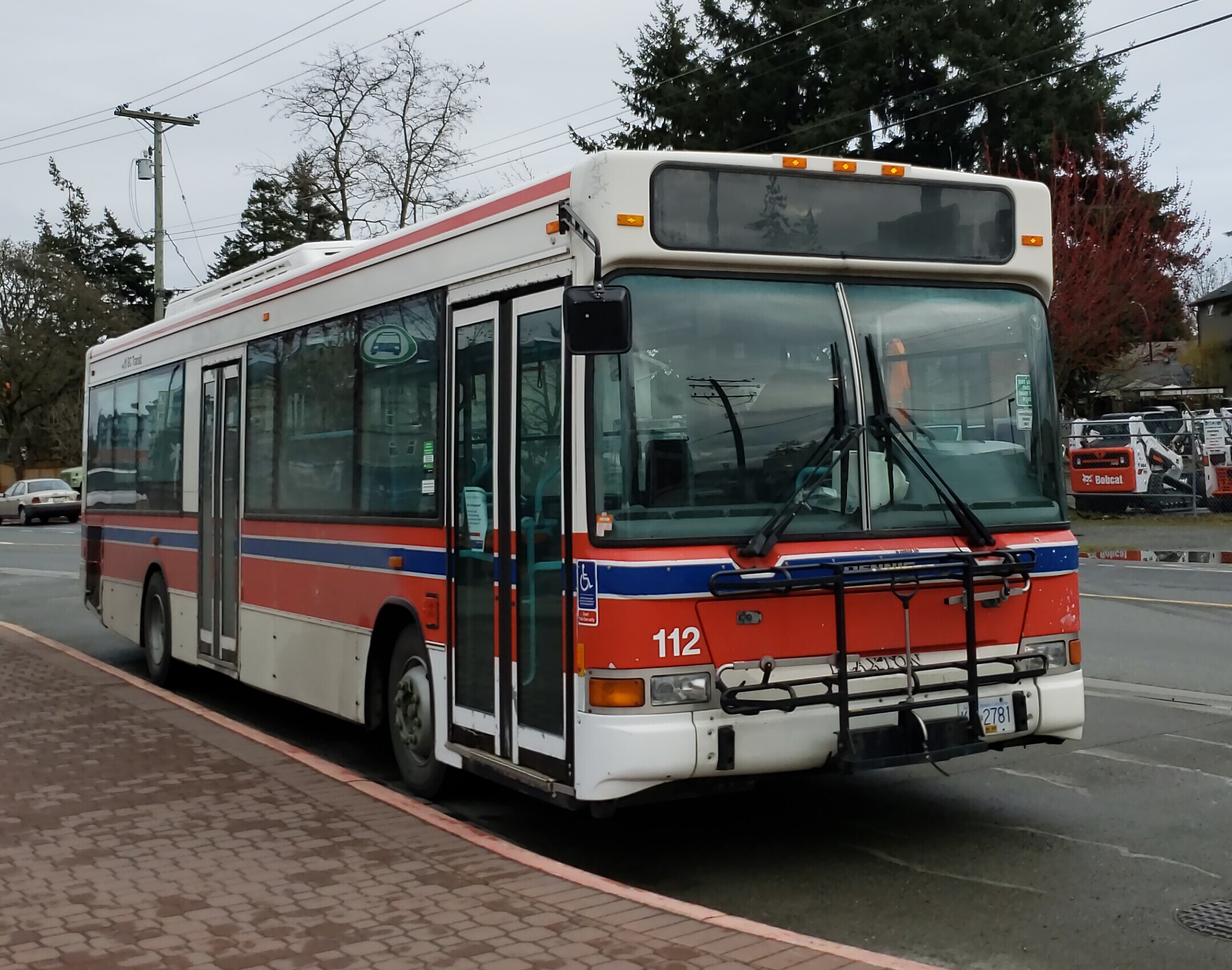
BC Transit left-hand drive Plaxton Pointer 2 bodied Dennis Dart SLF in March 2020

Like the original Pointer, air-conditioned Pointer 2 bodied Dart SLFs proved popular with Hong Kong bus operators. Following the awarding of Hong Kong Island's franchised bus services to New World First Bus by the government in 1998, the operator took delivery of a total 76 Pointer 2 bodied Dart SLFs between 1998 and 1999 for use on the new network; some of these were later sold to Kowloon Motor Bus as surplus to requirements.

Hong Kong's first Super Pointer Darts were delivered to Park Island Transport, all of which were painted yellow and equipped with luggage racks. Eight were first delivered in 2003, these being the only Pointer Darts for Hong Kong produced by TransBus, followed by three produced by Alexander Dennis in 2007. The final two Plaxton Pointers produced were delivered to Park Island Transport in 2008.

A small number of Pointer 2s were also exported to left-hand drive markets. The largest of these was Canadian provincial bus operator BC Transit, who took delivery of 90 air-conditioned Pointer 2s on Dart SLF chassis between 1999 and 2001 for lower-density routes in and around Whistler, British Columbia, Cowichan Valley, and the greater Victoria region. Two Pointer 2 bodied Dart SLFs were also supplied to Icelandic operator Hagvagnar in 1999 for use on Strætó bs services.

== See also ==
- List of buses
