= Volvo B6BLE =

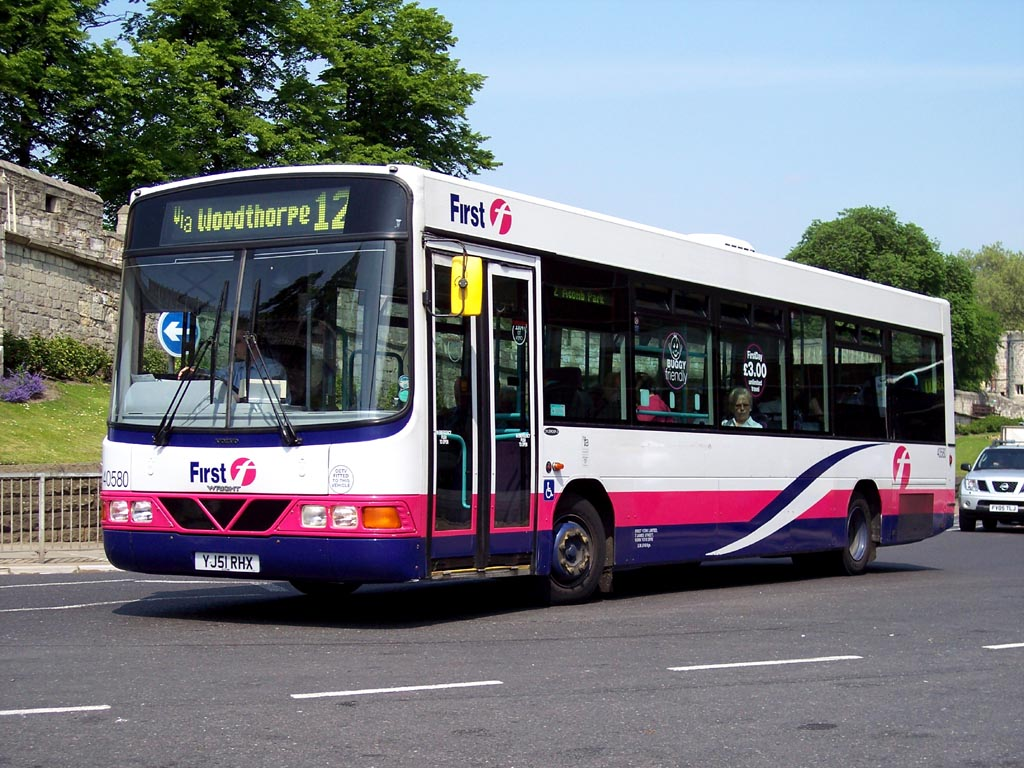
- A Wright Crusader 2 bodied B6BLE of First York.

Overview
- Manufacturer: Volvo
- Production: 1999-2001
- Assembly: Scotland (1999-2000); Sweden (2000-2001)

Body and chassis
- Class: Midibus chassis
- Doors: 1 or 2
- Floor type: Low entry

Powertrain
- Engine: Volvo D6A
- Capacity: 5.5 litres

Dimensions
- Length: 10.1 metres or 10.7 metres
- Width: 2.4 metres
- Height: 2.7 metres

Chronology
- Predecessor: Volvo B6LE
- Successor: Volvo B7RLE

The Volvo B6BLE was a ~5-litre engined low-entry midibus chassis manufactured by Volvo between 1999 and 2001, with three unfinished or unsold chassis being bodied in 2004 and 2005.

== History ==
The Volvo B6BLE was presented in November 1998 as a replacement for the B6LE. Compared to the B6LE it had a new lower chassis frame with increased low floor area, independent front suspension giving more than 10 cm wider gangway between the front wheel arches, and front end "kneeling", giving a 25 cm entrance height. Like its predecessor, it continued to compete with the Dennis Dart SLF.

A total of 346 known B6BLEs were produced between 1999 and 2001, including two for Australia, nine for Norway and two for Sweden. When the Irvine plant was closed in 2000, production moved to Sweden. The last buses were registered as late as April 2002, but the model year on the chassis VINs reveal that they were built in 2001, waiting to be bodied.

A further B6BLE was delivered for Plaxton's Bus 2000 concept in 2004, followed by a second Bus 2000 B6BLE in 2005, but the VINs indicate that they were initially manufactured in model year 2000. A third chassis was available for the Bus 2000 project in 2005; however, it was not required, and was instead sold to New Zealand and bodied by Kiwi Bus Builders. This chassis had 1999 as model year.

In some markets, the B6BLE was followed by short-wheelbase variants of the B7RLE.

== Engines ==
D6A, 5478 cc, in-line 6 cyl. turbodiesel (1999-2001)

- D6A180 - 132 kW (180 bhp), 550 Nm, Euro 2
- D6A210 - 154 kW (210 bhp), 700 Nm, Euro 2
