= Volvo B6 =

Volvo B6/B6LE
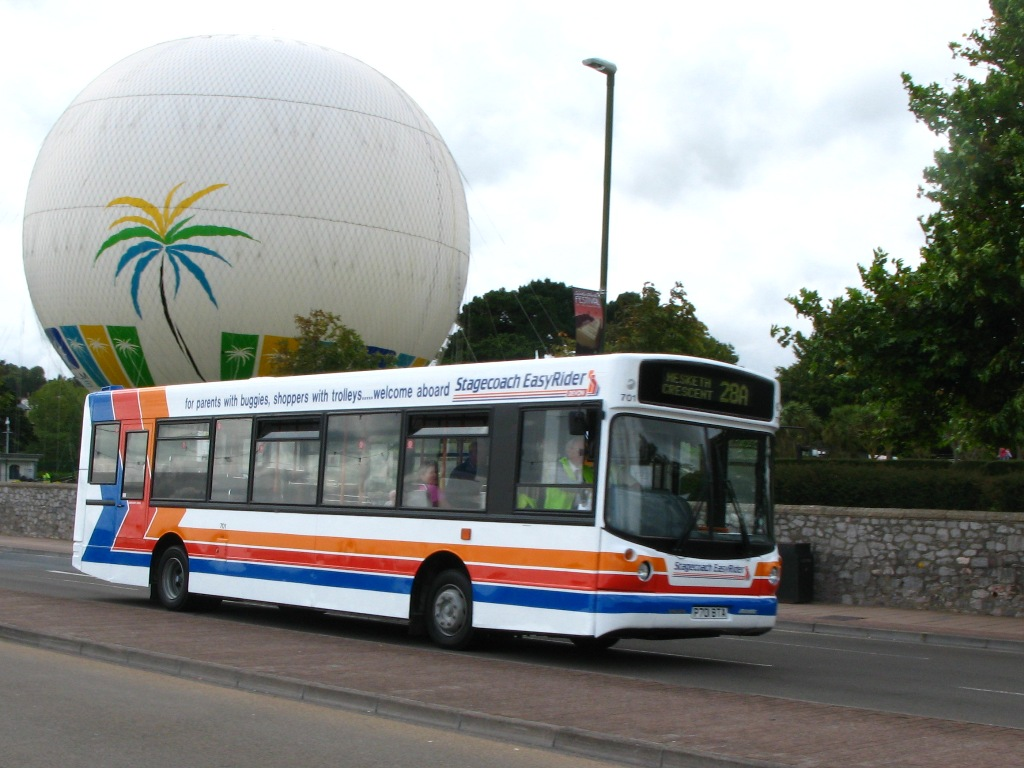
- Preserved Alexander ALX200 bodied B6LE in Torquay in September 2011

Overview
- Manufacturer: Volvo
- Production: 1991–1999
- Assembly: Austria (1991–1992); Scotland (1993–1999)

Body and chassis
- Class: Midibus chassis
- Doors: 1 or 2 doors
- Floor type: Step deck (555 mm (21.9 in)); Low floor (350 mm (14 in))

Powertrain
- Engine: Volvo TD63, D6A
- Capacity: 5.5 L (340 in^{3})
- Transmission: Allison/ZF 4HP500

Dimensions
- Length: 8.5 m (27 ft 11 in) to 10.6 m (34 ft 9 in)
- Width: 2.5 m (8 ft 2 in)
- Height: 3.0 m (9 ft 10 in)

Chronology
- Predecessor: Leyland Swift
- Successor: Volvo B6BLE

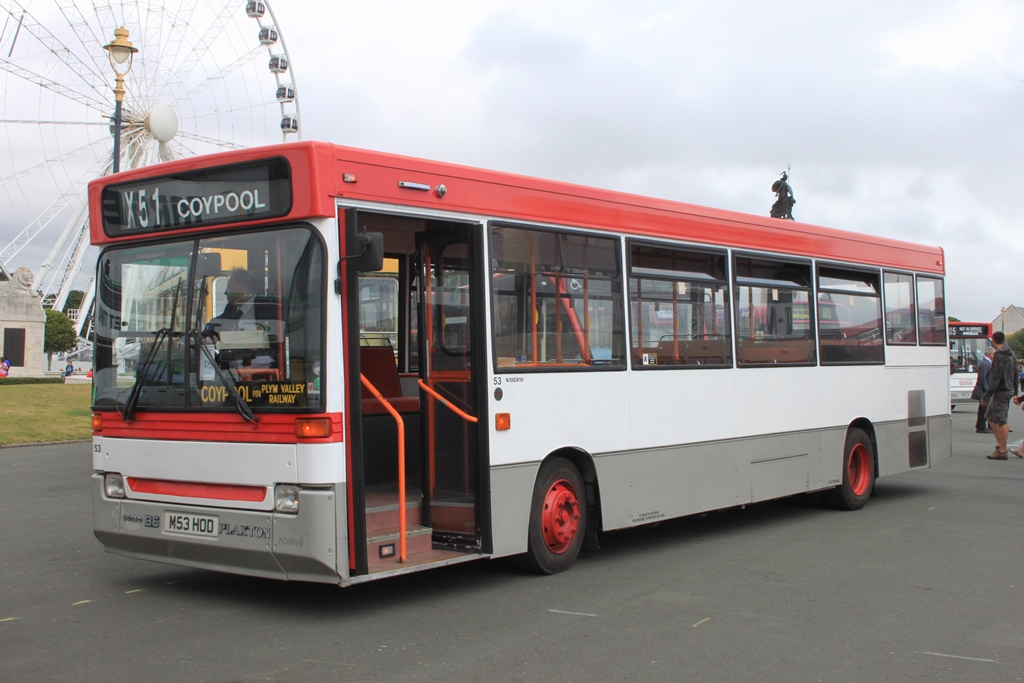
Preserved Plymouth Citybus Plaxton Pointer bodied B6 in Plymouth in April 2013

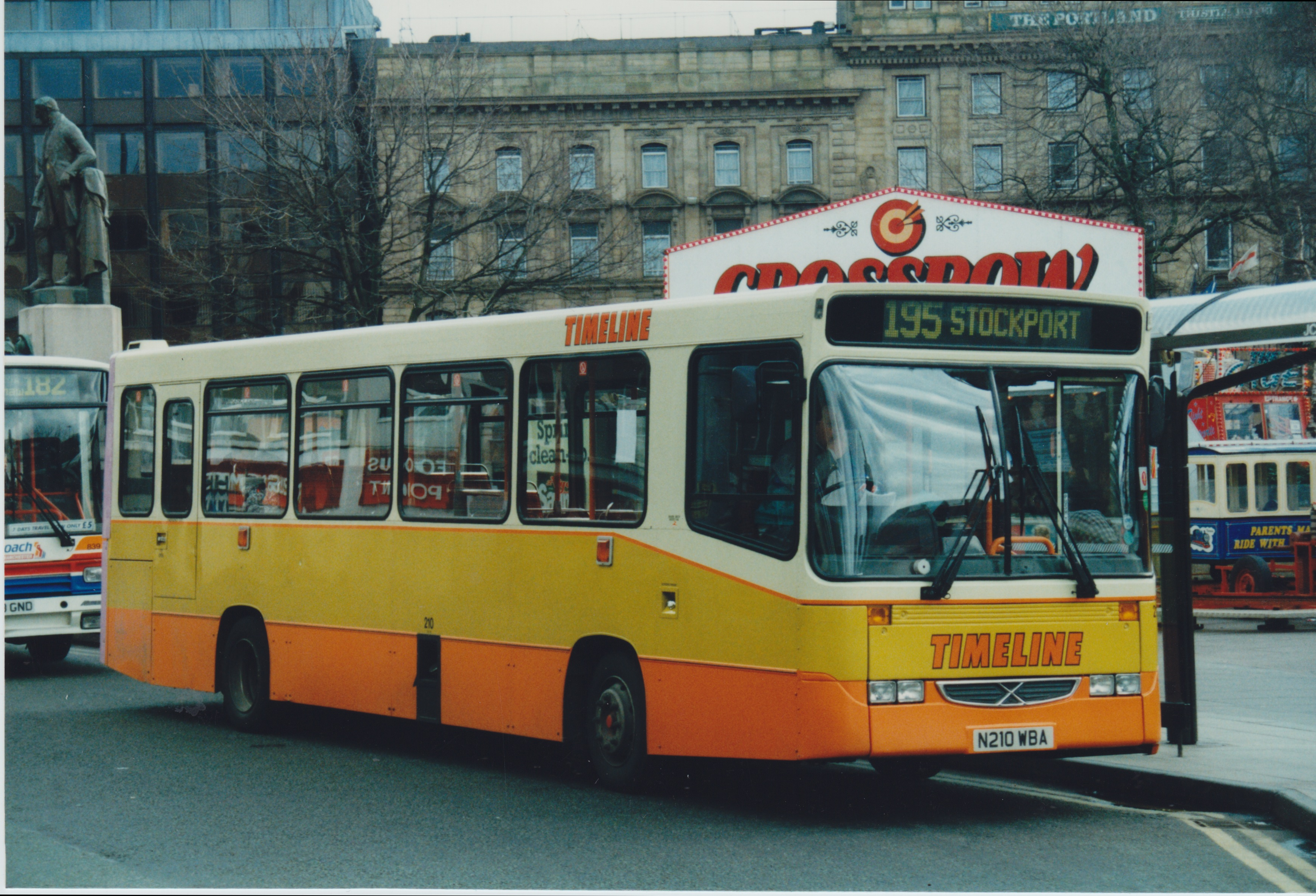
Timeline Travel Alexander Dash bodied B6 in Manchester

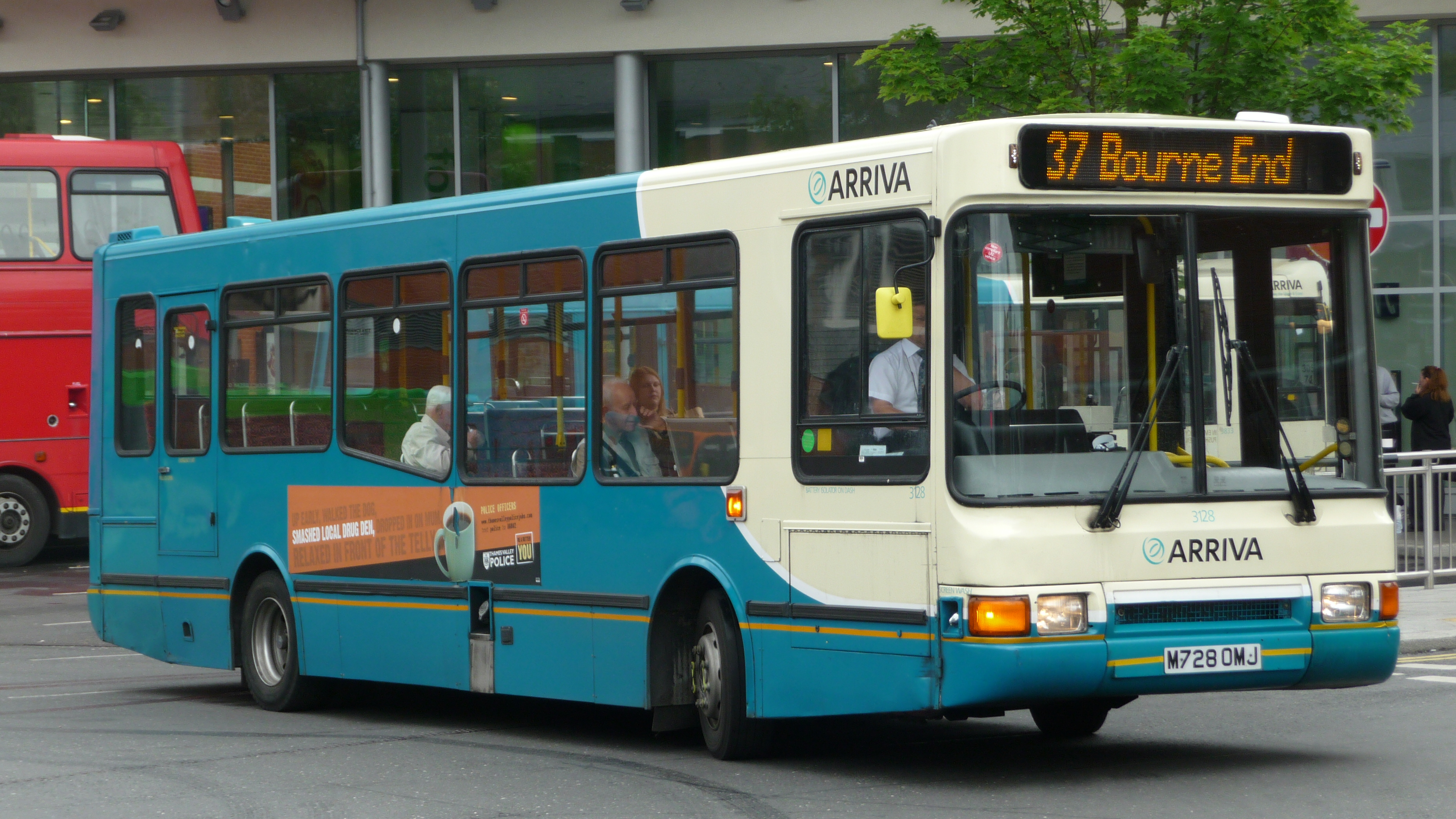
Arriva Shires & Essex Northern Counties Paladin bodied B6 in High Wycombe in July 2009

The Volvo B6 was a 5.5-litre (1.2-imperial-gallon) engined midibus chassis manufactured by Volvo between 1991 and 1999. It was also available as the low-entry Volvo B6LE.

== History ==
In the United Kingdom, the B6 competed in the midibus market with the Dennis Dart, and with the MAN 10.xxx HOCL and 12.xxx HOCL/12.xxx HOCL-NL throughout Europe. When launched in 1991, it was presented as being available in several different lengths; 8.5 metres (28 feet) (B6-36), 9.0 metres (B6-41), 9.9 metres (B6-50) and a 9.1-metre coach version (B6-45). For LHD markets it was available with a 350 mm (14 in) low-entry floor, while the RHD markets had to wait until 1995 before this option became available.

Most B6s were built for the UK market, but 61 were exported to Hong Kong and some to Australia. They were also sold in mainland Europe, both in bus and in coach versions. When launched in the UK, it was marketed as the B6R, but this name would later only be used in the Asia-Pacific region.

== Volvo B6 ==
The initial pre-production series of around 30 (or more) chassis were manufactured by Volvo subsidiary Steyr Bus GmbH in Vienna, Austria. This would however not be the case with the production series, as Volvo moved it to Scotland. Most of the pre-production units were built as coaches. Only nine of these units were delivered in the United Kingdom.

In March 1993, serial production of the B6 started up at Volvo's brand new bus chassis plant in Irvine, Scotland. The B6-50 length was instantly popular. The short-wheelbase B6-36 sold a few from the start, but customers soon chose the B6-41 instead.

The B6-45 midicoach suffered from disappointingly low sales in the UK - by 1995, when the RHD version was withdrawn from sale, only fourteen had been built. The last one being delivered to the Russian embassy in 1998, being unsold since 1995. No further RHD B6-45s were ever built. For the RHD markets also the entire step-entrance B6 lineup was discontinued in 1997, while the LHD version was available until the introduction of the B6BLE in 1999. The step-entrance B6 never received a proper successor. Between 1993 and 1997 a total of 627 B6s were delivered in the UK.

The B6 were labelled as the Volvo B6R in the Asia-Pacific region. In Australia, Blue Ribbon purchased five, Southtrans four and Whyalla City Transport two. Citybus of Hong Kong took delivery of one Alexander bodied B6R.

== Volvo B6LE ==
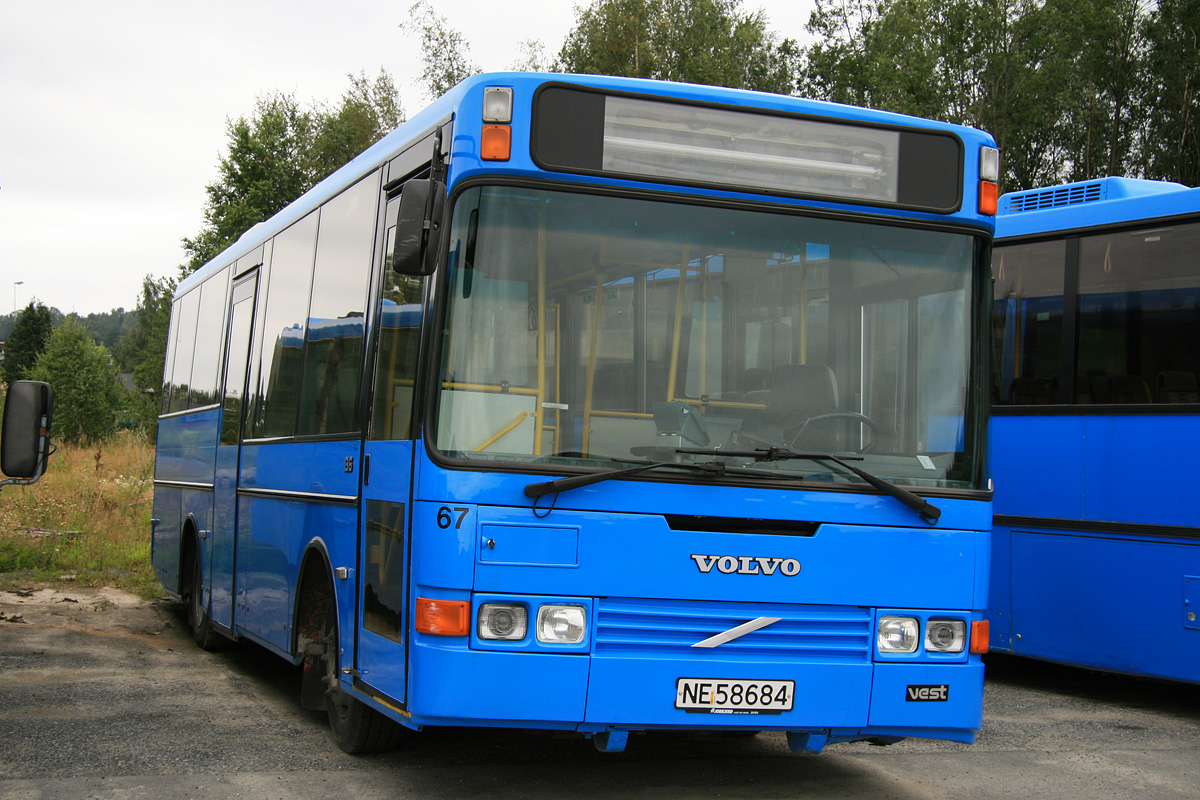
Vest bodied B6LE delivered in October 1993, possibly being the first ever B6LE. Here in Porsgrunn in August 2007.

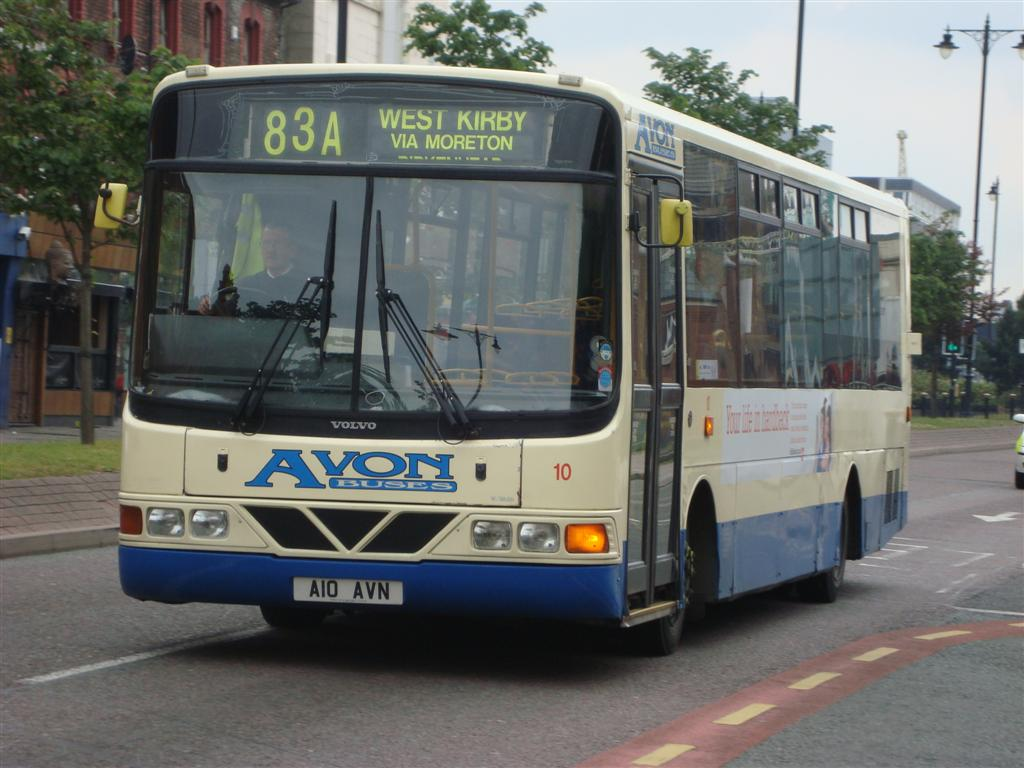
Avon Buses Wright Crusader bodied B6LE in Birkenhead in June 2009

The B6LE was initially only available as left-hand drive, but in 1995 it also became available as right-hand drive, to compete with the Dennis Dart SLF. However, after sales proved promising, the B6LE completely replaced the B6 in some markets in 1997 before it was itself replaced by the B6BLE in 1999.

A total of 394 B6LEs were produced for the UK between 1995 and 1999; this includes two modified vehicles used as the testbed for the then-upcoming B6BLE.

The B6LE were labelled as the Volvo B6RLE in the Asia-Pacific region. In Australia, Brisbane Transport purchased two B6RLE. Three were purchased by National Bus Company in Brisbane. Citybus (Hong Kong) took delivery of 20 Plaxton Pointer bodied B6LEs, with 10 being single door and 10 being double doors. There were also 10 bodied with ALX200 that had overhead luggage racks and 30 B6LE bodied with the local Jit Luen bodywork.

== Engines ==
TD63, 5478 cc, in-line 6 cyl. turbodiesel (1991-1995)

- TD63E - 132 kW (180 bhp), 520 Nm, Euro I
- TD63ES - 154 kW (210 bhp), Euro I

D6A, 5478 cc, in-line 6 cyl. turbodiesel (1995-1999)

- D6A180 - 132 kW (180 bhp), 550 Nm, Euro II
- D6A210 - 154 kW (210 bhp), 700 Nm, Euro II
