= Disabled Persons Transport Advisory Committee =

UK Government advisory group

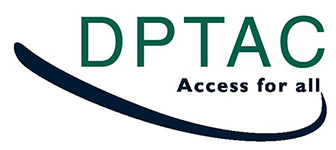

Agency overview
- Formed: 1985
- Jurisdiction: England
- Headquarters: London
- Minister responsible: Heidi Alexander MP, Secretary of State for Transport
- Agency executive: Professor Matthew Campbell-Hill, Chair
- Parent department: Department of Transport
- Website: Disabled Persons Transport Advisory Committee

The Disabled Persons Transport Advisory Committee (also known as "DPTAC") is an expert committee established by the Transport Act 1985, to provide advice to the government on the transport needs of disabled people.

Membership of the DPTAC is mostly, but not exclusively, disabled people.

== Work ==
The DPTAC mainly came into prominence with the 1988 publication of the 'Recommended Specification for Buses Used to Operate Local Services' document, soon followed by the 'Recommended Specification for Low-Floor Buses' in 1997. These documents recommended that new or existing step-entrance and low-floor buses in the United Kingdom be fitted with internal accessibility aids, such as brightly-coloured handrails with large bell-pushes attached, widened entrance doors with minimal or no steps, and non-slip flooring throughout the bus. Throughout the 1990s, new buses such as the Optare Spectra, Plaxton Pointer and Wright Endurance were delivered to operators with 'DiPTAC' features, while some operators modified older buses to accommodate these features.

Following the passage of the Disability Discrimination Act 1995, the DPTAC's guidance was superseded in 2000 by the Department for Transport's statutory Public Service Vehicle Accessibility Regulations (PSVAR). PSVAR saw buses and coaches with a carrying capacity of over 22 passengers withdrawn from revenue-earning service if they were not compliant with the new regulations, otherwise an operator risked being fined by the Department for Transport. Withdrawals of non-PSVAR-compliant single and double-decker buses were carried out by most bus operators for the end of 2015 and 2016 respectively, however some operators lengthened the service life of non-compliant buses by reclassifying them as coaches. Non-compliant coaches were scheduled to be withdrawn by the end of 2019, however this date has been repeatedly delayed until 31 July 2026 as a result of various exemptions being issued by the Department for Transport for school transport and rail replacement coach services.

The committee has advised the government on several measures, including requesting additional finance for works to rail access, and work on accessibility for users of taxi services.

The committee was considered for abolition with a successor organisation taking over its work. A consultation was held in 2012 with responses from organisations such as the Office of Road and Rail; however the result was not published by the committee.

During the coronavirus pandemic, the DPTAC issued guidance regarding the use of face coverings, specifically on the identification of exemptions to the requirements.
