= Wright Endurance =

Step-entrance bus body on Scania N113 and Volvo B10B chassis

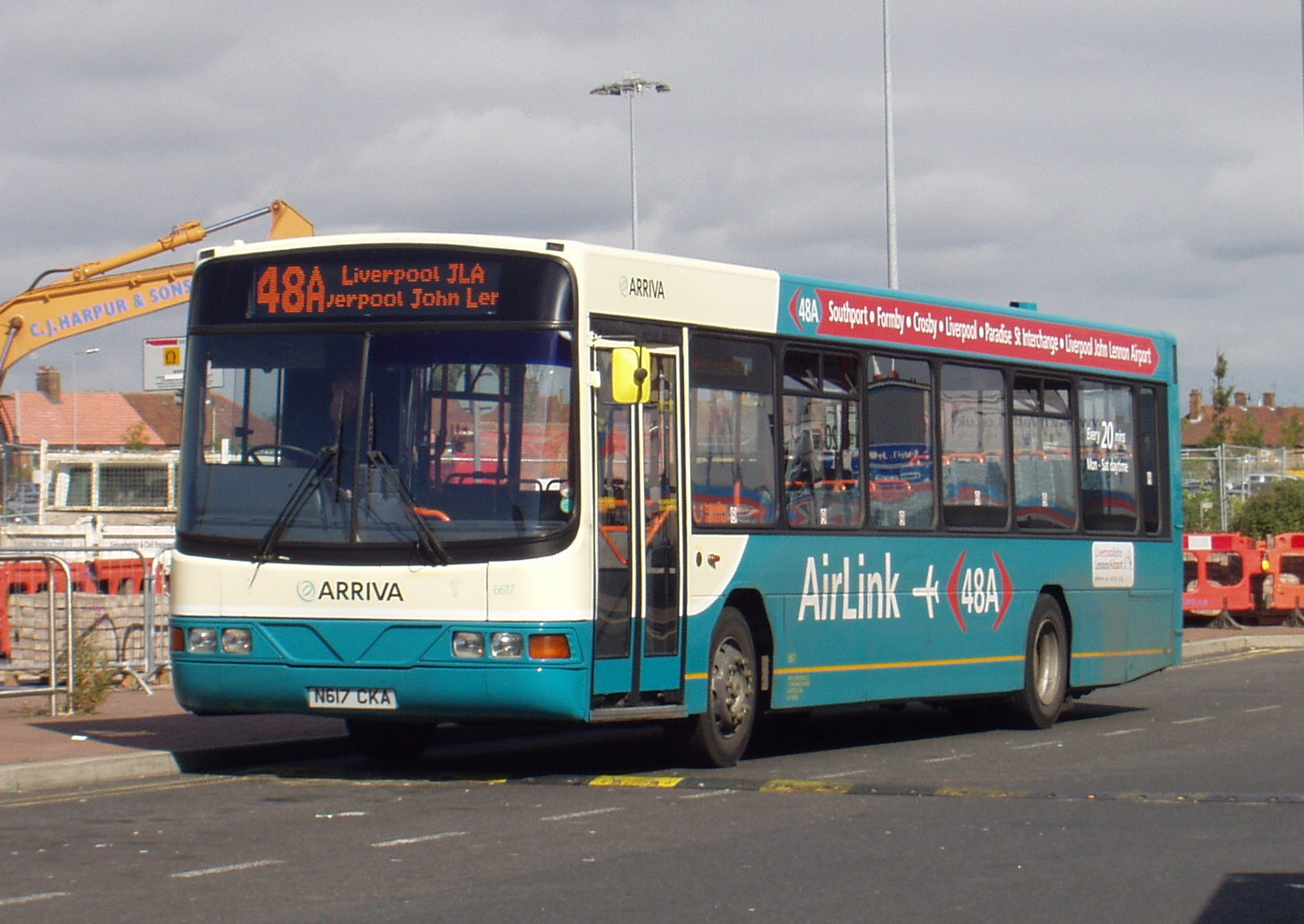
- Arriva North West & Wales Endurance bodied Volvo B10B at Liverpool Airport in 2007

Overview
- Manufacturer: Wrightbus
- Production: 1992 - 1997
- Assembly: Ballymena, Northern Ireland
- Designer: Trevor Erskine

Body and chassis
- Doors: 1 or 2
- Floor type: Step entrance
- Chassis: Scania K93; Scania N113; Volvo B10B
- Related: Wright Endeavour

Powertrain
- Engine: Scania; Volvo THD103
- Transmission: Voith; ZF Ecomat 4HP500

Dimensions
- Length: 11.75 metres
- Width: 2.50 metres

Chronology
- Successor: Wright Axcess-Ultralow; Wright Liberator

The Wright Endurance was a step-entrance single-decker bus body on Scania N113 and on Volvo B10B chassis by Wrightbus between 1992 and 1997.

== Design ==
The Wright Endurance was unveiled in November 1991 as the company's first single-decker 'city bus' body, having previously specialised on coach and midibus bodies. It was the early basis of a Wright body suitable for a low-floor bus chassis, with the bodywork constructed with an Alusuisse bolted aluminium frame onto the chassis. The Endurance featured a 320 millimetres (13 in) low step at the entrance door, capable of being lowered to 240 millimetres (9.4 in) at the kerbside via the 'kneeling' function of the chassis, supplemented with the fitting of a manual extendable ramp for wheelchair users. Design cues from the Endurance would be replicated on Wright's Endeavour coach body, with 25 built exclusively for Ulsterbus express services in 1992 on the Leyland Tiger chassis, as well as future Wright bus bodies through to the early‑2000s.

=== Related designs ===
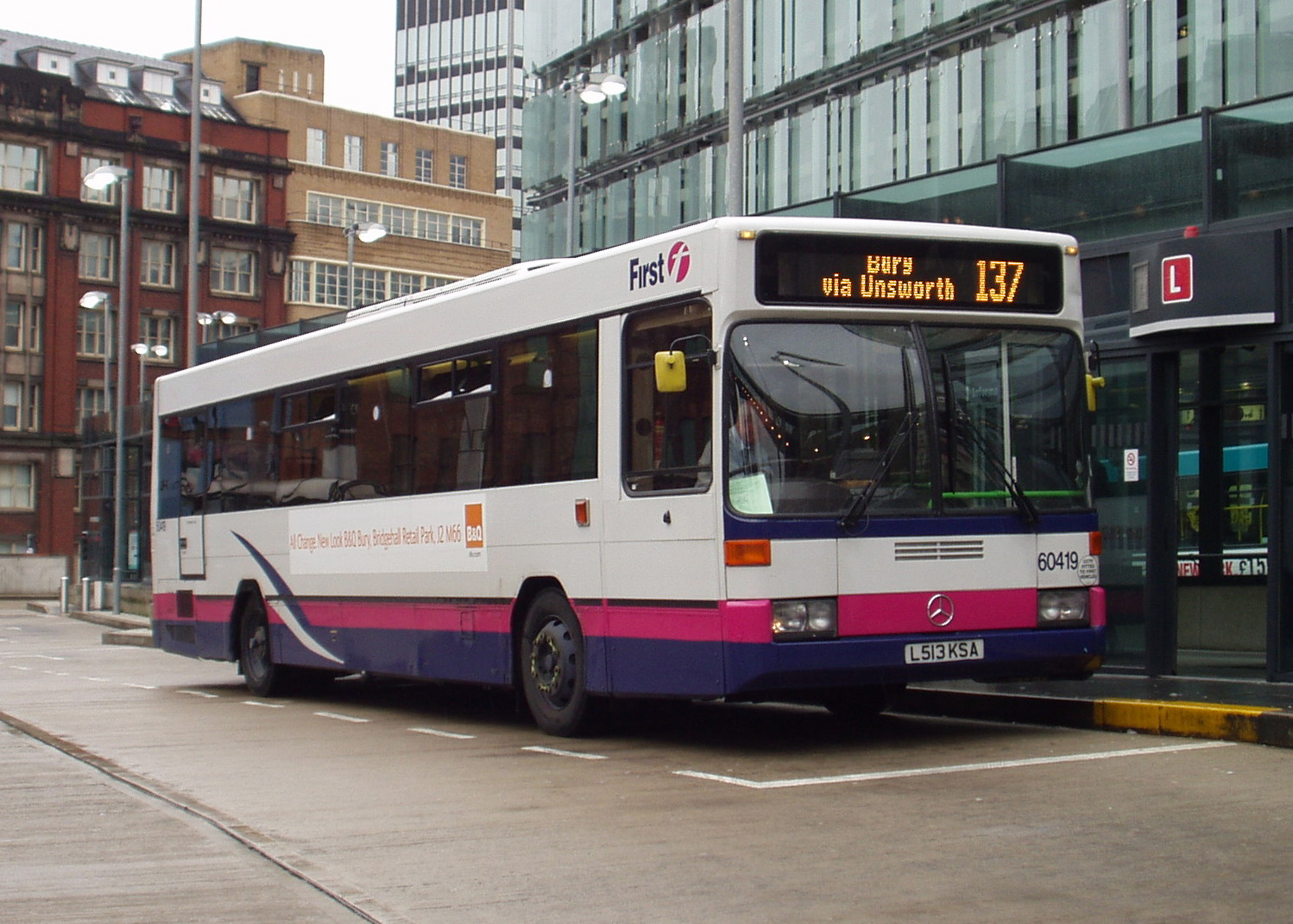
First Greater Manchester CityRanger bodied Mercedes-Benz O405 in Manchester

Endurance-style bodywork was also built on Mercedes-Benz chassis, in which forms it was given different names.

The CityRanger was based on the Mercedes-Benz O405 chassis, and though structurally similar to the Endurance, it differed visually by having Mercedes' own front-end design as well as shallower side windows. Only 22 were built, 20 of which were delivered to the GRT Group's Grampian and Midland Bluebird operations during 1993; the 14 CityRangers delivered to Grampian were equipped with air-conditioning and double-glazed bonded window glazing.

The UrbanRanger was more similar to the Endurance, being of almost identical appearance. Only sixteen were built, the first a demonstrator for Mercedes-Benz registered in July 1994; this was later sold to Midland Choice of Willenhall, who would purchase three new UrbanRangers in 1996. A pair of UrbanRangers was delivered to UniversityBus of Hatfield for services in and around the University of Hertfordshire in 1995, while the final four UrbanRangers were not sold until 1998, when they went to Chambers of Moneymore in Northern Ireland. An UrbanRanger was purchased by the Buckinghamshire Fire and Rescue Service for conversion into a mobile command unit, while an UrbanRanger was delivered to the Irish Army for use as a troop transporter.

== Operators ==
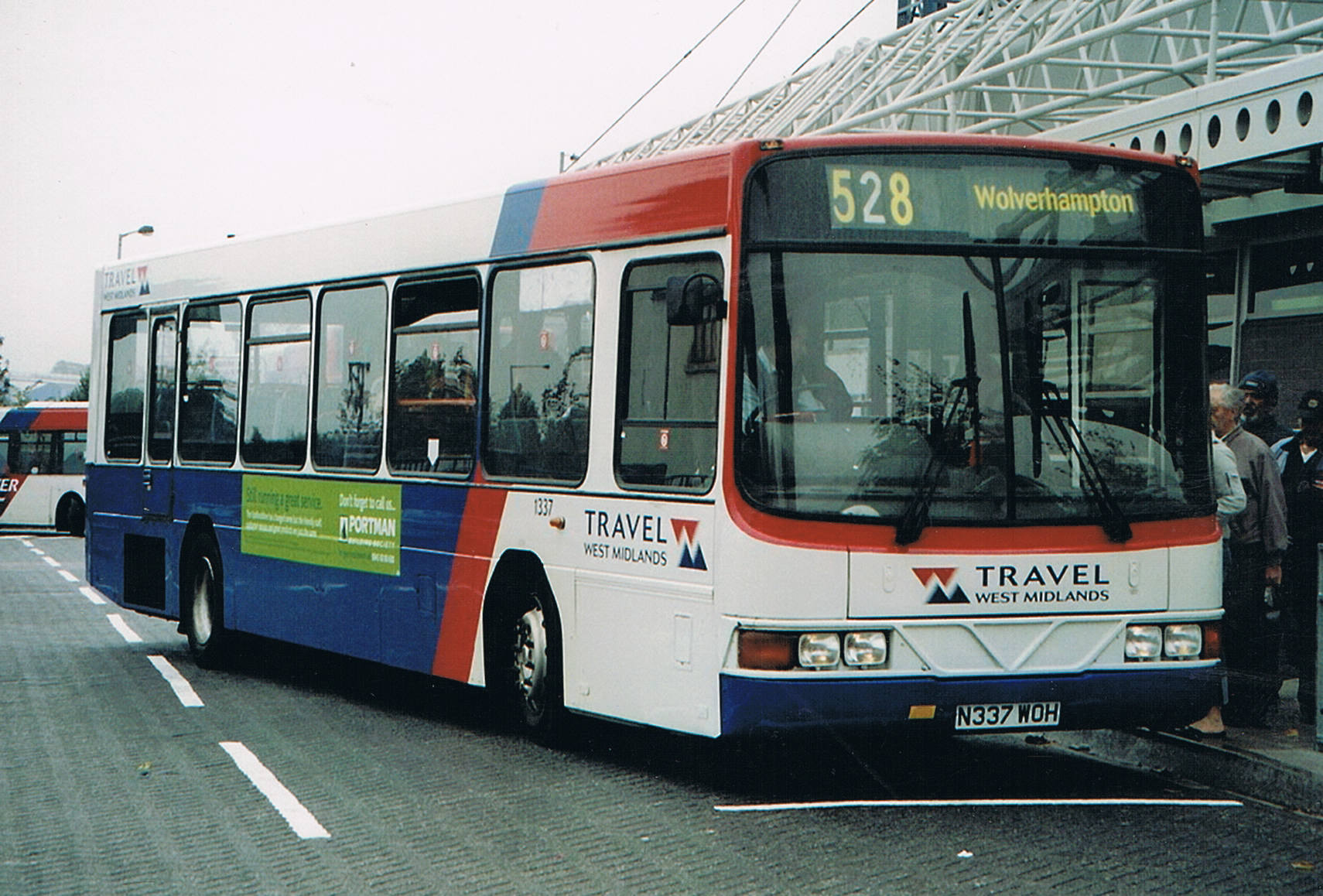
Travel West Midlands Wright Endurance bodied Volvo B10B in Wolverhampton

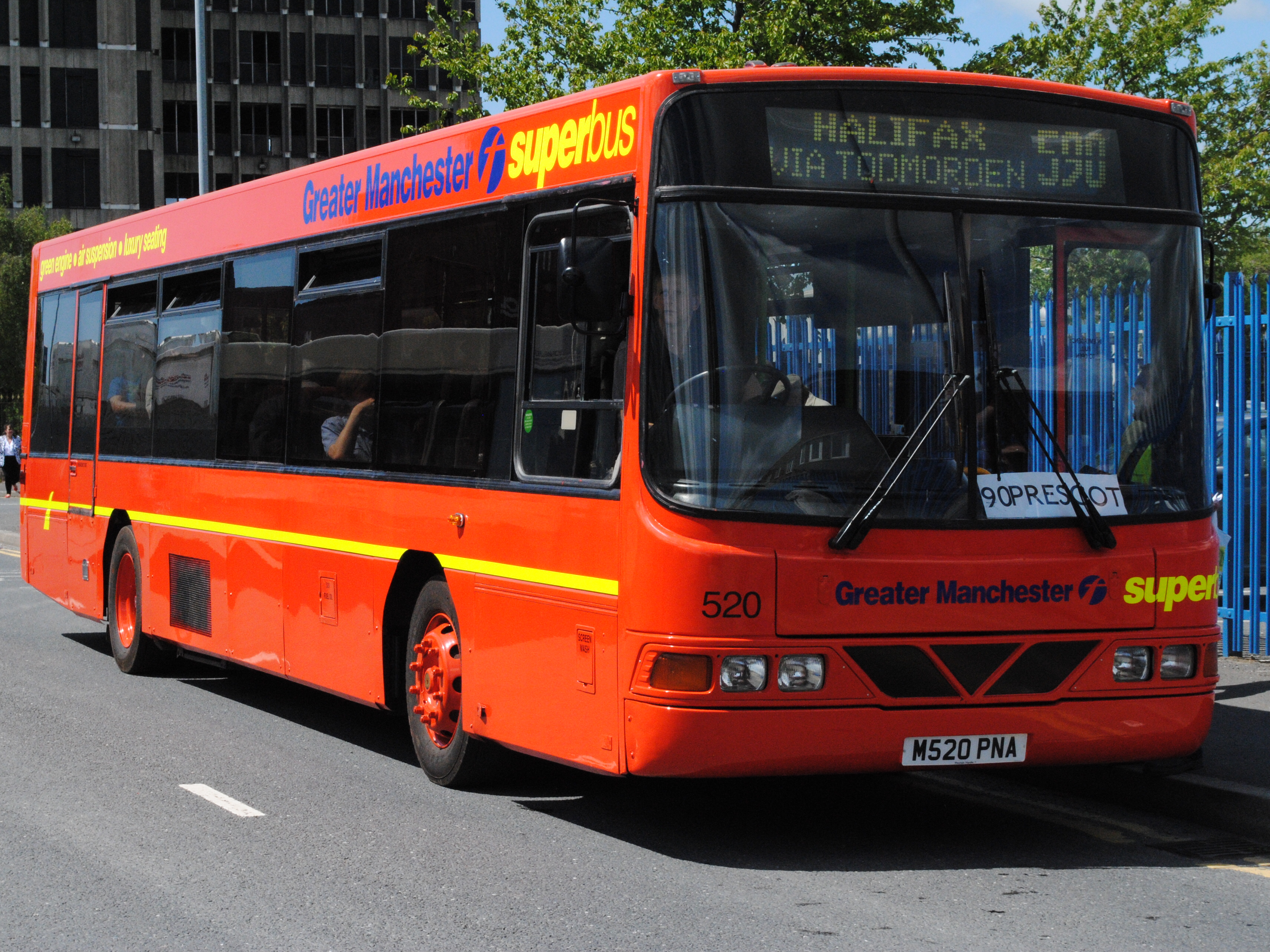
Preserved First Greater Manchester 'Superbus' Wright Endurance bodied Volvo B10B in Kirkby, Merseyside in June 2013

The first production Wright Endurances came in the form of five high-floor examples built on Scania K93 chassis for Yorkshire Traction of Barnsley, the only Endurances that were built on this chassis. Midland Bluebird, meanwhile, were the only other operator to take delivery of Wright Endurances on Scania N113 chassis, with a first batch of 16 delivered to the operator in 1994, followed by an additional eight delivered to Midland Scottish alongside two diverted to fellow GRT Group subsidiary Lowland in 1995.

A majority of Wright Endurance bodies were built on Volvo B10B chassis throughout the body's production run. The largest operator of Wright Endurances on Volvo B10B chassis was MTL North, who purchased a total of 120 between 1994 and 1996 for use across its core Merseyside bus network as well as in competition with operators in the area. The second-biggest operator, West Midlands Travel, took delivery of a total 65 Endurances on Volvo B10B chassis during 1996. Originally, the company had ordered 150 Endurance-bodied B10Bs, which would have made WMT the largest operator of Endurances, however the order was changed to the in-development Wright Liberator on the Volvo B10L chassis.

GM Buses North, meanwhile, first introduced a fleet of 20 Wright Endurances branded as 'Superbus' for service on Manchester to Bury services in early 1995, where the operator was running services in competition with MTL Manchester's Volvo B6 midibuses; a further 35 built to Superbus specification were delivered later in 1995 to the operator's Bolton, Bury and Oldham depots. A smaller operator of Wright Endurances on Volvo B10B chassis included the Blazefield Group, who took delivery of a total 25 Endurances before moving onto the Volvo B10BLE based Wright Renown; the group's Sovereign Bus & Coach operation first took delivery of five Endurances in early 1995, which were followed by an additional four Endurances and the purchase of a former demonstrator model during 1996, while Endurances were also operated by Harrogate & District for the 36 service, Keighley & District and Yorkshire Coastliner.

Smaller fleets of Endurances included Bus Éireann, who had ten dual-door examples delivered in 1997, Caldaire Holdings, where five examples were delivered to subsidiary operators SMT and West Riding respectively in 1993, and CMT Buses, who had four Endurances delivered in 1995.
