= Plaxton Premiere =

Range of step-entrance coach bodywork

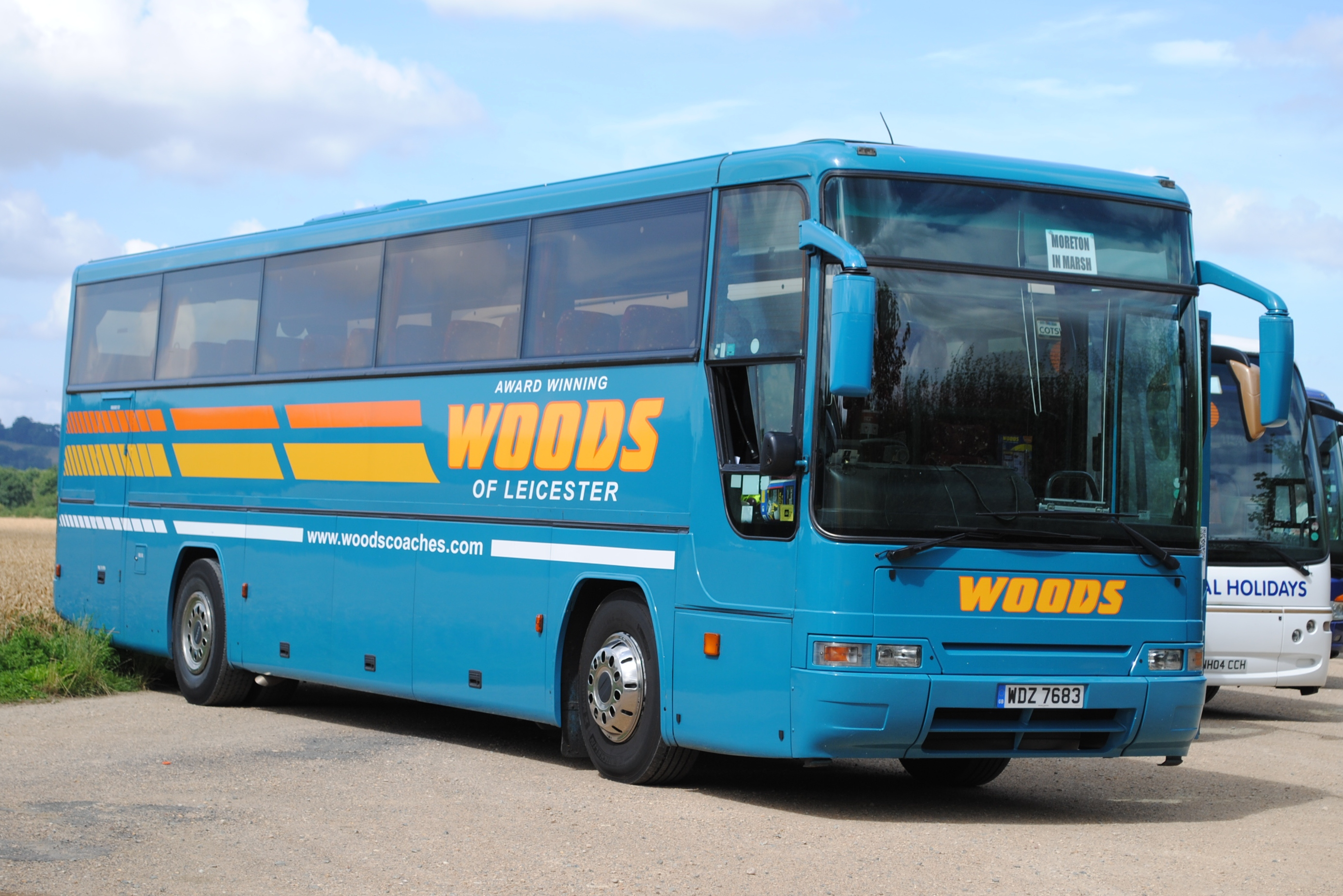
- Woods of Leicester Plaxton Premiere bodied Volvo B10M at Moreton-in-Marsh in August 2013

Overview
- Manufacturer: Plaxton
- Production: 1991–2002
- Assembly: Scarborough, North Yorkshire, England

Body and chassis
- Doors: 1
- Floor type: Step-entrance
- Chassis: DAF SB3000; Dennis Javelin; Volvo B7R; Volvo B9M; Volvo B10M; Volvo B12; Scania K93; Scania K113

Powertrain
- Engine: DAF (DAF SB3000); Scania (Scania K93/K113); Volvo (Volvo B9M/B10M); Volvo TD122 (Volvo B12); Volvo D7B260 (Volvo B7R)

Dimensions
- Width: 2.5 m (8 ft 2 in)
- Height: 3.2–3.7 m (10–12 ft)

Chronology
- Predecessor: Plaxton Paramount
- Successor: Plaxton Panther; Plaxton Paragon; Plaxton Profile

The Plaxton Premiere, Plaxton Excalibur and Plaxton Prima were closely related designs of coach bodywork built by Plaxton.

== Variants ==
=== Premiere ===
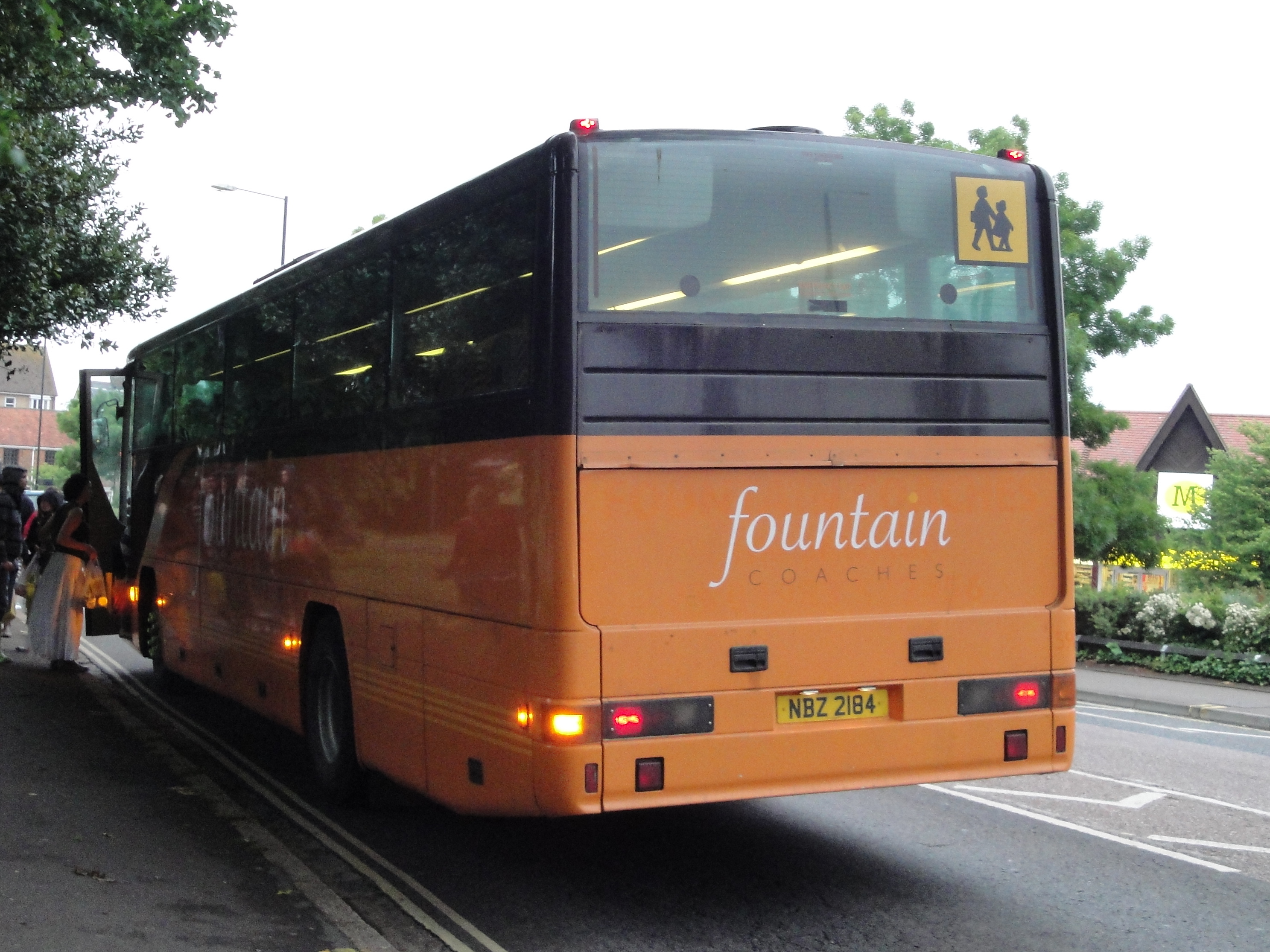
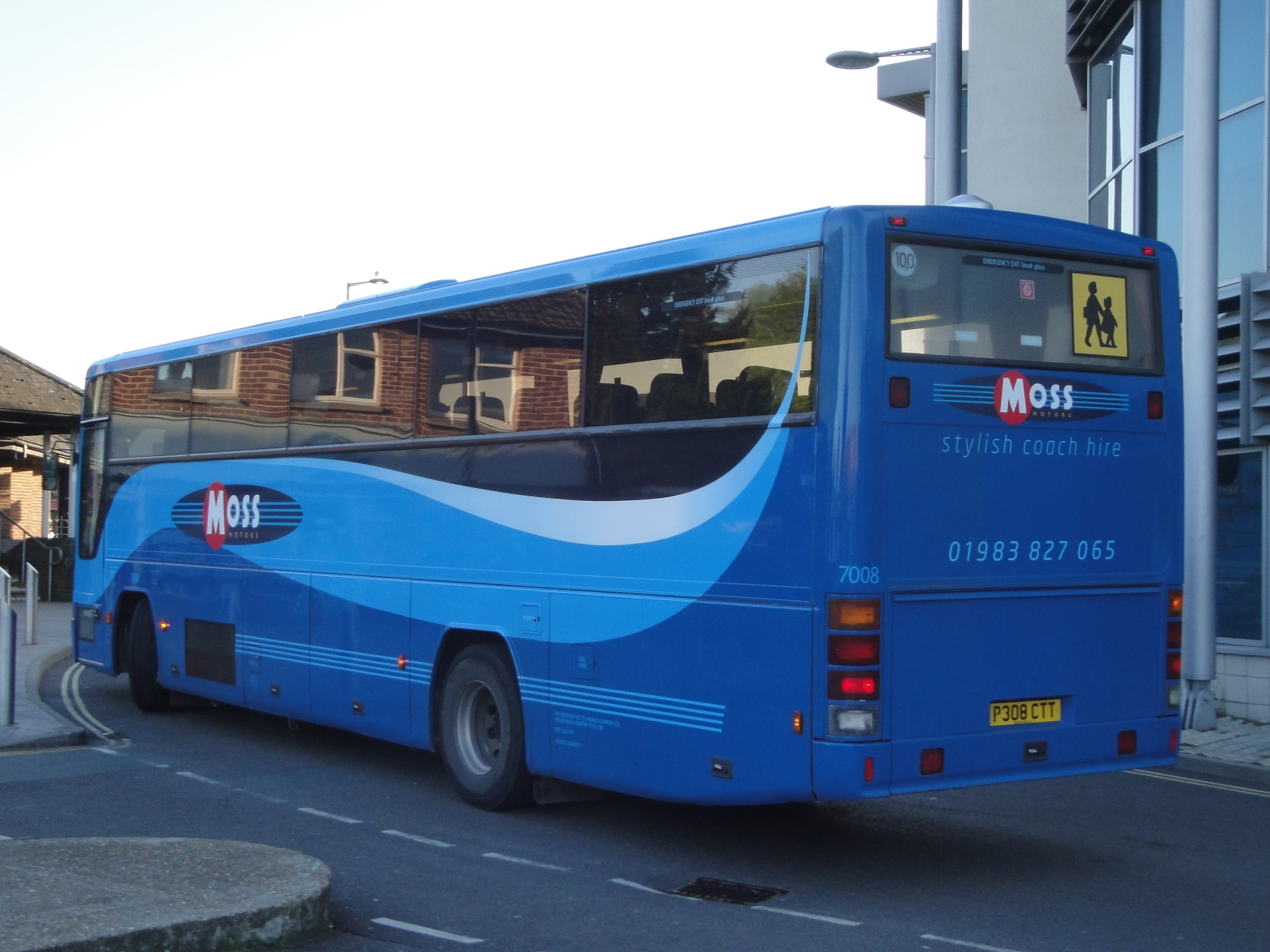
Rears of Southern Vectis pre and post-1993 facelift Plaxton Premiere bodied Volvo B10Ms

Designed over the course of three years under the codename 'Project X' and costing £3.5 million (equivalent to £8,050,000 in 2025) to develop, the Plaxton Premiere was revealed in August 1991 as the successor to Plaxton's versatile Paramount body, later receiving separate official launches at the 1991 Bus and Coach Show on Scania K93 chassis at the National Exhibition Centre in Birmingham and on the Volvo B12 export chassis at the 1991 European Bus and Touring Coach Fair in Kortrijk. At launch, the Premiere was available for bodying on the Volvo B10M, Volvo B12B, Scania K93 and K113, and Dennis Javelin coach chassis, with all but the then-new Volvo B12 previously offered for the Paramount; Premieres also began to be bodied on the DAF SB3000 chassis from 1995.

The Premiere was built with a welded steel frame compliant with ECE-R66 rollover safety legislation, with galvanised Durasteel panels fitted on the top half of the body and lower panels manufactured through resin transfer moulding; decorative side mouldings and inset window panes as seen on the Paramount were omitted for a smoother and more aerodynamic shape. A new rounded front end was a notable feature of the new Premiere, which could be bodied at heights of either 3.2 m (10 ft) or 3.5 m (11 ft), had a seating capacity for 53 recliner seats, and was fitted with tinted double-glazed windows, an updated heating system with options for air conditioning, and improved plug doors. Plaxton claimed that the Premiere and Excalibur had the lowest drag coefficient of any coach produced in the United Kingdom at the time.

Early Premieres built between 1991 and 1993 featured air intakes below the front number plate and a rear window which curved aerodynamically into the roofline, the latter of which was criticised by operators for being a source of leaks. In 1993, the Premiere underwent a facelift, which saw the front air intakes removed and replaced with a smooth bumper, the front headlight clusters being angled as opposed to rectangular, and the rear of the body fully restyled to replace the curved rear window with a flat rectangular shape and to reposition the taillights vertically as opposed to horizontally.

Volvo launched an SE variant of its B10M chassis in 1995, featuring a longer wheelbase and shorter rear overhang, changes which were achieved via the installation of a side-mounted radiator and intercooler as well as the relocation of the fuel tank above the rear axle. Plaxton's Premiere 350 was the launch vehicle for this new chassis in the United Kingdom, achieving nearly 5 m^{3} (180 cu ft) of luggage space in the front luggage lockers while also seeing a 450 mm (18 in) reduction in rear overhang.

==== Expressliner II ====
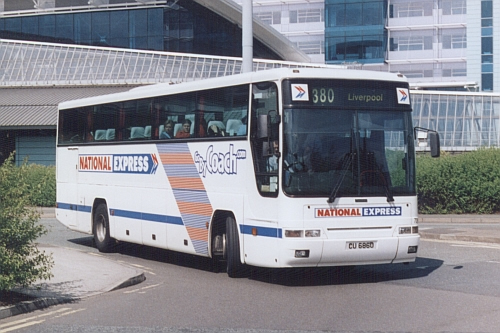
National Express Plaxton Expressliner II bodied Volvo B10M at Manchester Airport in April 2003

The Expressliner II was launched in August 1992 as a variant of the Premiere 350 built to National Express specification on the Volvo B10M and Dennis Javelin chassis, serving as the second iteration of the Expressliner concept that was first applied to Paramount 350-bodied B10Ms. These coaches were sold or leased through National Expressliners Ltd, a joint venture between Plaxton and National Express that intended to form a uniform fleet of Plaxton-bodied National Express coaches across the United Kingdom.

Features adapted for the Expressliner II included flipdot or rollblind destination equipment, a three-piece windscreen and heavy-duty pantograph wipers, while premium 'Rapide' models featured waste disposal bins, a servery area and a chemical toilet. Each coach was also equipped with reclining seats trimmed with the National Express moquette design.

==== Premiere Interurban ====
The Premiere Interurban was a variant of the Premiere 320 designed for medium-distance express coach services.

A handful of Premiere Interurbans were also built as 71-seat articulated coaches on Volvo B10MA chassis, the first such coaches to be built in Britain. These were exclusively received by subsidiaries of the Stagecoach Group on express services, with ten delivered during 1996 initially split to Stagecoach East Midland for use on the 909 service between Kingston upon Hull, Grimsby and Sheffield, Stagecoach Fife for use on regional express services, and Stagecoach Ribble for use on the Manchester to Burnley X43 and Manchester to Blackpool X61 services.

=== Excalibur ===
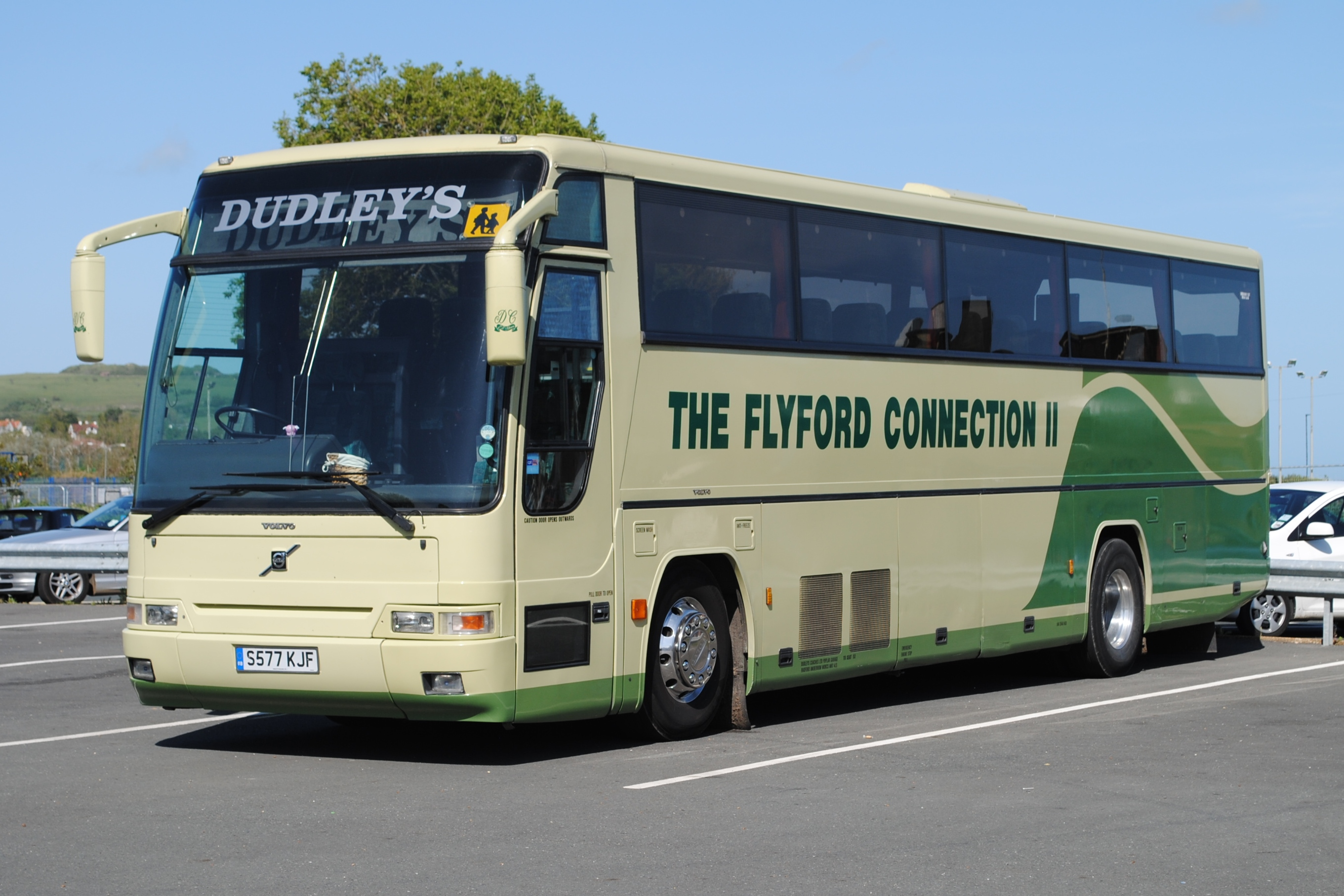
Dudley's Plaxton Excalibur bodied Volvo B10M in Sandown on the Isle of Wight in June 2015

The Plaxton Excalibur was launched at the same time as the Premiere in 1991, being marketed as a premium version of the Premiere 350 in competition with both the newly launched Mercedes-Benz O404 and the Setra S 300. Although it shared most of the same components and chassis configurations as the Premiere, the design of the Excalibur differed by having a distinctive 'swept-back' fascia featuring a raked windscreen, and internally, the Excalibur featured a plug door as standard, as well as including reclining seats with optional drop-down armrests and luggage hooks, enclosed luggage racks and pull-down sunblinds as standard, and a Blaupunkt speaker system.

The Excalibur was also bodied on the long-wheelbase Volvo B10M SE variant, allowing for an underfloor luggage compartment, accessible by lockers on both sides of the coach, to be equipped as standard when compared to conventional B10Ms.

==== Prestige ====
The Plaxton Prestige was a 3.7 m (12 ft) left-hand drive export version of the Excalibur that was built on a tri-axle variant of the Volvo B12 chassis, uniquely utilising a 'lowcab' design that enabled the driver's cab to be 470 mm (19 in) lower than on standard B12s. The body and chassis combination was briefly marketed by Volvo towards French luxury coach operators, competing against established designs by Jonckheere and Van Hool. The name was later revived by Plaxton for the Northern Counties Paladin LF low-floor bus when production was moved from Northern Counties' Wigan factory to Plaxton's Scarborough factory.

=== Prima ===
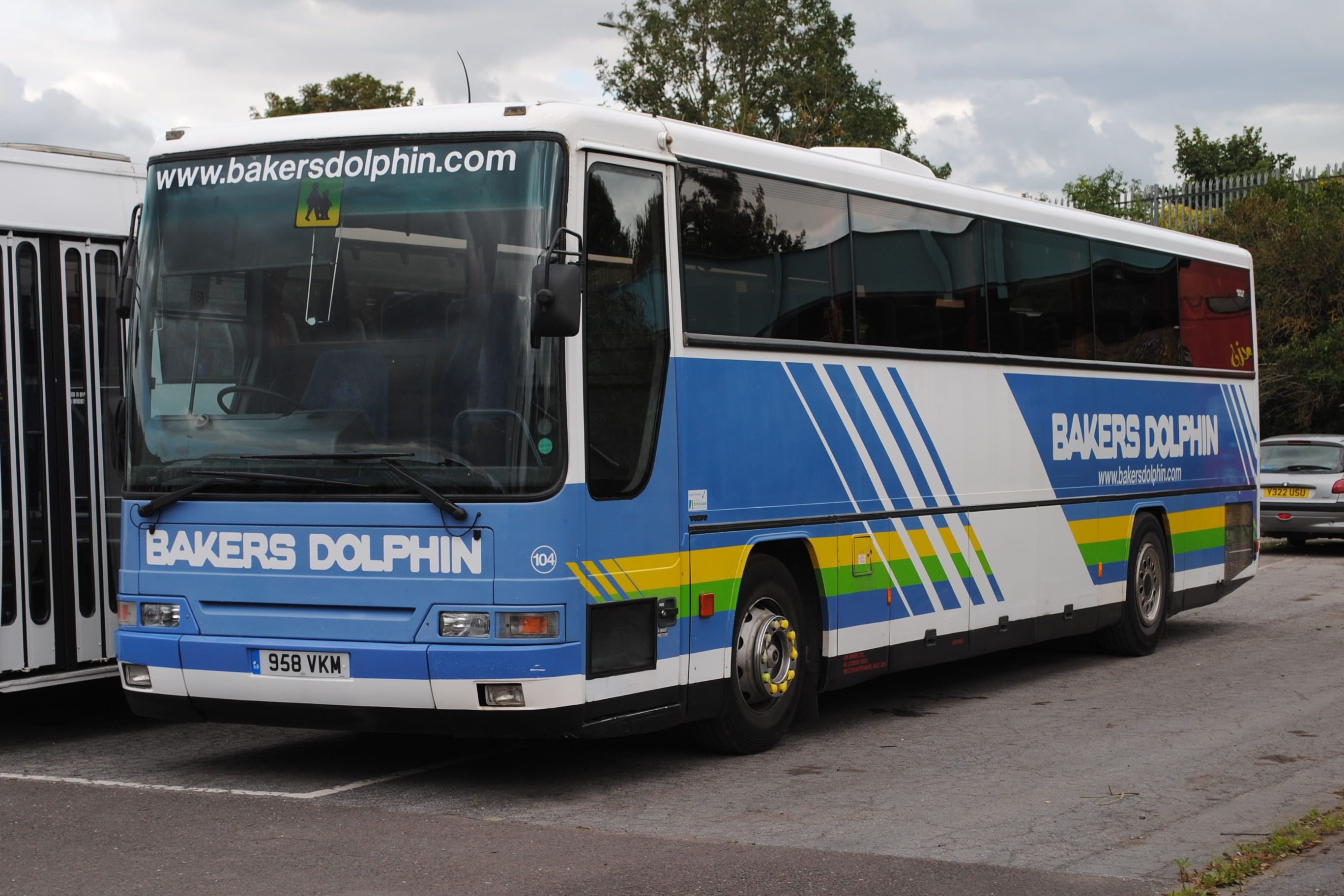
Bakers Dolphin Plaxton Prima bodied Volvo B7R in Weston-Super-Mare in September 2015

The Plaxton Prima was launched in November 1997 at the Coach & Bus 97 expo on Volvo's new B7R chassis, which intended to serve as a fuel-efficient replacement of the B10M. The Prima was marketed as a budget version of the Premiere for price-conscious operators: although it retained the same design and framework as the Premiere, standard features of the Prima included 57 seatbelted and reclining seats with fixed footrests, ribbed cord interior trim, solid rubber flooring and an overhead luggage rack design reused from the Paramount. As standard, the Prima-bodied B7R was equipped with Volvo's D7B260 engine with the option for either a ZF S6-85 six-speed synchromesh manual or ZF 4HP500 automatic gearbox; the Prima was later offered on both the DAF SB3000 and Dennis Javelin chassis, though the majority of operators took delivery of B7Rs.

== Operators ==
=== Premiere ===
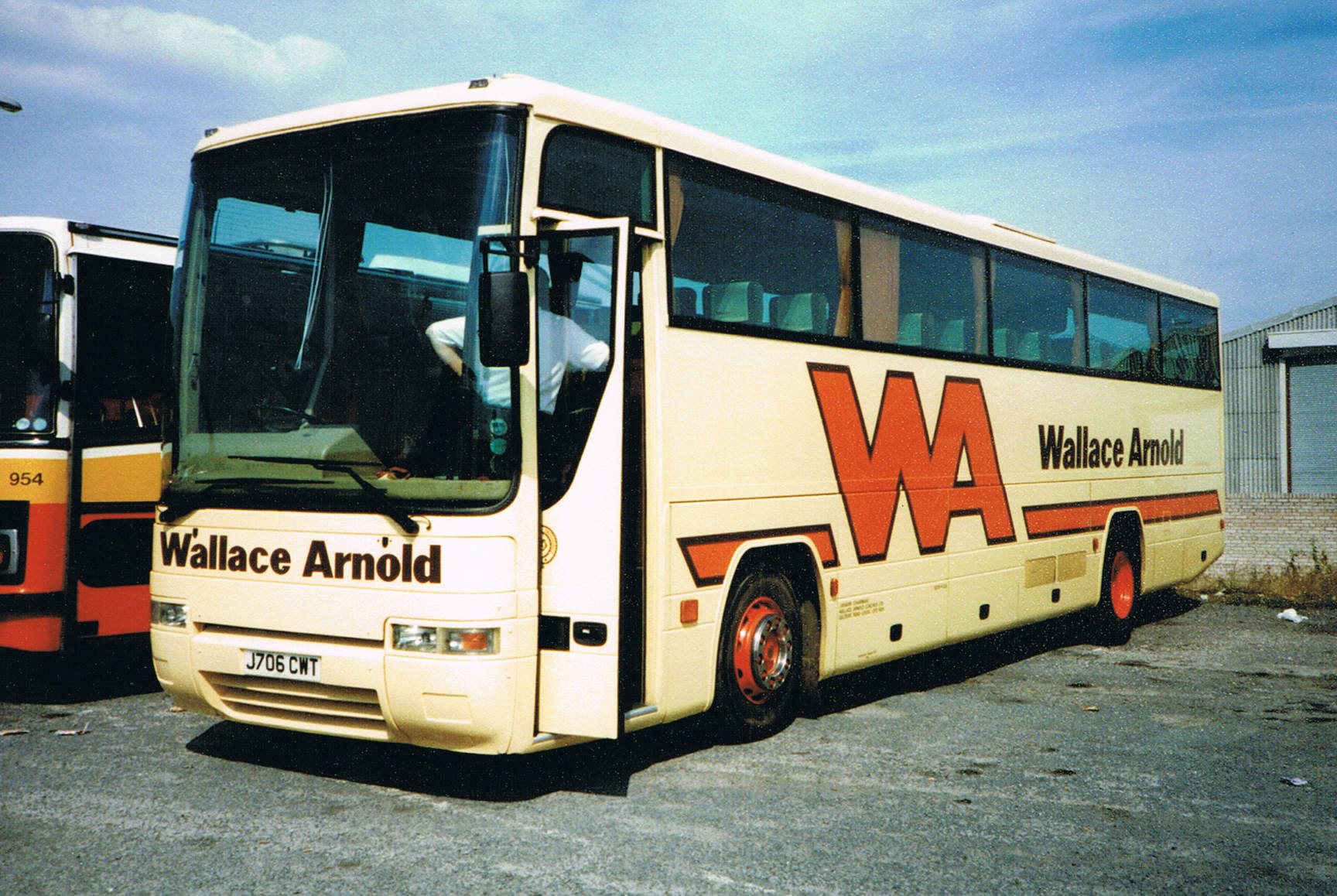
Wallace Arnold Plaxton Premiere bodied Volvo B10M in Blackpool

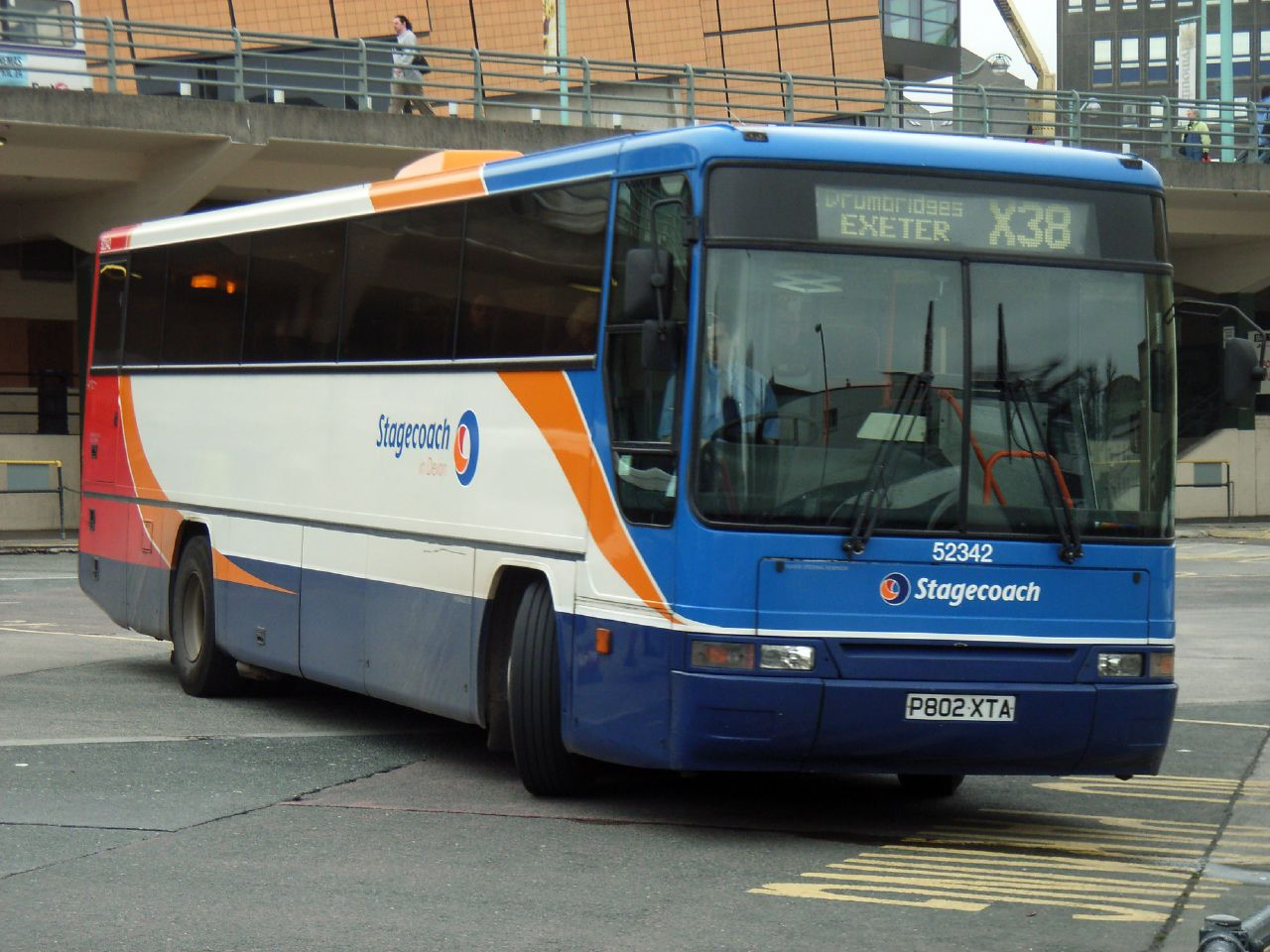
Stagecoach in Devon Plaxton Premiere Interurban bodied Volvo B10M in Plymouth

Early major customers for the Plaxton Premiere upon its 1991 launch were coach holidays operators and popular Paramount customers Wallace Arnold and Shearings. Wallace Arnold ordered 50 Premieres on Volvo B10M chassis, while Shearings ordered 30 Premiere 3200s on Scania K93 chassis as well as ten air-conditioned Premiere 3500s on Volvo B10M chassis for use on coach tours to Continental Europe. These operators continued to take delivery of further Premieres throughout its production run.

A small number of Premieres were also produced on Volvo B9M midicoach chassis, with Capital Logistics, a previous customer Paramount-bodied B9Ms, taking delivery of four 10 m (33 ft) Premiere bodied B9Ms for use on its contract services in 1997.

The Stagecoach Group was a highly popular customer of the Premiere Interurban, choosing to standardise on it as its standard coach body throughout the 1990s; a two-year contract placed in August 1992 worth £7.5 million (equivalent to £16,549,000 in 2025) to supply 150 of the type, 100 on Volvo B10M and the remaining 50 on Dennis Javelin chassis, was Plaxton's biggest ever order during a time of financial difficulties for the manufacturer. Many Premiere Interurbans were delivered to Stagecoach's Scottish subsidiaries, including A1 Service, Bluebird, and Western, with six on Volvo B10M chassis also delivered to United Counties for use on the subsidiary's 'Coachlinks' network.

Other operators who purchased conventional Premieres for express coach services included Ulsterbus, who took delivery of 80 on Volvo B10M chassis for use on its Goldliner network between 1994 and 1996, Bus Éireann, who purchased 59 on Volvo B10M chassis between 1996 and 1997, Cambridge Coach Services, First Eastern Counties, First Kelvin, London Coaches (Kent), and City of Oxford Motor Services.

National Express contractors who took delivery of Expressliner II-specification Premieres included East Yorkshire Motor Services, West Midlands Travel's Central Coachways arm, Yorkshire Traction, Premier Travel of Cambridge, Wessex Coaches of Bristol and Selwyns Travel of Runcorn.

=== Excalibur ===
Wallace Arnold and Shearings also took delivery of Plaxton Excaliburs, with Wallace Arnold ordering ten Excalibur 3500s on Volvo B10M chassis prior to launch in 1991; an additional Excalibur 3500 from this order was built to high specification as the team coach for Leeds United F.C., being fitted out leather seating, bunk beds, partitions, tables and a kitchenette.

=== Prima ===
In December 1997, Arriva ordered eighteen Plaxton Prima Interurban bodied DAF SB3000s for use on Green Line Coaches services, with ten being delivered to Arriva The Shires and the remaining eight delivered to Maidstone & District. 86 Prima Interurban bodied B7Rs were also ordered by Bus Éireann in 2000, however only 55 of these were delivered to the operator.

Coaching operators of the Prima included Simonds Coach & Travel, who purchased a Prima on Volvo B7R chassis during 2000.
