= Wrightbus =

Northern Irish bus manufacturer

- Type: Private
- Industry: Automotive
- Founded: 1946; 80 years ago
- Founder: Robert Wright
- Headquarters: Ballymena, Northern Ireland
- Key people: Jean-Marc Gales (CEO)
- Products: Bus and coachwork
- Revenue: £181 million (2017)
- Number of employees: 1,300 (2023)
- Parent: Bamford Bus Company
- Website: wrightbus.com

Simplified Wrightbus logo

Wrightbus (stylized WRIGHT, or simply Wright) is a Northern Irish bus manufacturer and a pioneer of the low-floor bus. The company was established in 1946 by Robert Wright and was later run by his son Sir William Wright, until it was acquired in 2019 by British businessman Jo Bamford.

== History ==
=== 1940s to 1970s – Early years ===
Wrightbus was founded in 1946 as Robert Wright & Son Coachbuilders. In its early years it rebodied lorries. In 1978, the company released its first aluminium-structured bus bodywork.

=== 1990s – Breakthrough into bus bodybuilding sector ===
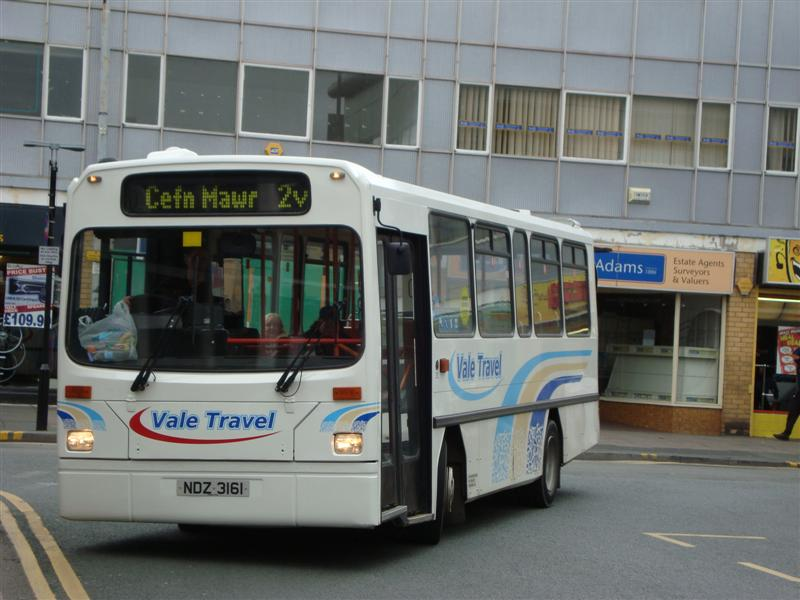
GHA Coaches Wright Handybus bodied Dennis Dart in Wrexham in March 2009

Wright's breakthrough into the mainstream bus bodybuilding sector came in the early 1990s. The Handybus was a midibus body offered on a variety of chassis but was most successful on the emerging Dennis Dart, attracting reasonably-sized orders from a variety of operators including London Buses, Go Ahead Northern, Ulsterbus and Citybus (Belfast). This was followed by a move into the full-size single deck market with the Endeavour which was fitted to Dennis Javelin, Leyland Tiger and Scania K93 chassis, and enabled Wright to develop its highly successful Endurance body which competed with the Alexander Strider and Northern Counties Paladin for orders on Volvo B10B and Scania N113CRB chassis.

Other Wright products introduced in this period included two Mercedes-Benz-based products, the O405 based Cityranger and the OH1416 based Urbanranger. The latter was launched around the time bus operators in the UK began switching to low floor chassis and consequently only attracted a handful of orders. However, Wright had become well established in the bus bodybuilding sector by then, and was able to exploit the opportunities the low-floor revolution would offer it from the mid-1990s onwards.

==== Low-floor ====
In 1993, the Pathfinder on low floor Dennis Lance SLF and Scania N113CRL chassis was unveiled.

The Axcess-Ultralow was introduced in 1995 and offered on the Scania L113 chassis. At this time it was selling in reasonable numbers to UK bus operators, but unlike other bodybuilders who could only offer the L113 with step-entrance bodies, Wright modified it by removing the middle section of the chassis and thus offered UK bus operators one of the first mainstream low-floor body/chassis combinations. A major customer for the Axcess-Ultralow was FirstGroup, taking approximately 240.

Next up was the Volvo B10L based Liberator introduced at the end of 1995: National Express ordered 120 in 1997. This would be followed by the Renown body built on the Volvo B10BLE chassis, which went on to become the standard bus of the Blazefield Group.

=== 2000s ===
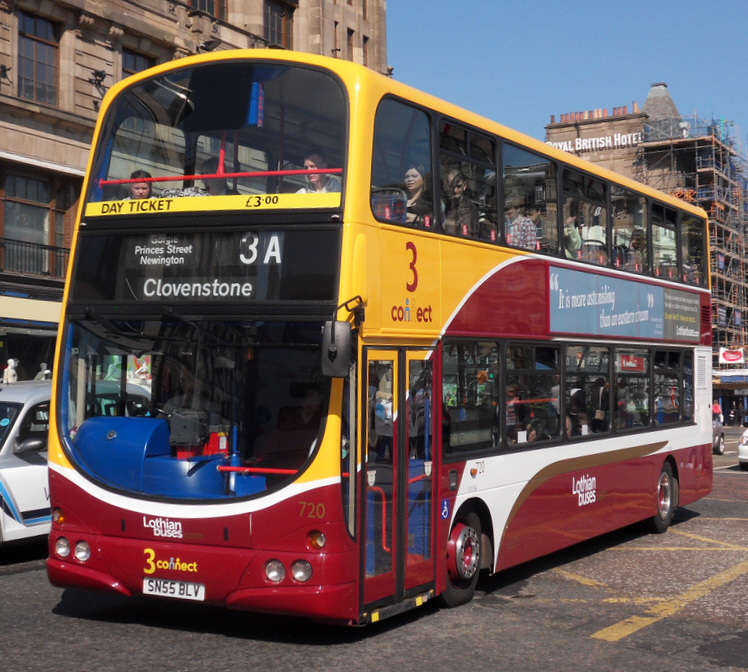
Lothian Buses Wright Eclipse Gemini bodied Volvo B7TL in Edinburgh in April 2010

Robert Wright & Son was restructured in 2000, with the bus building operation rebranded to Wrightbus as a part of the Wright Group. Companies formed alongside Wrightbus in the Wright Group were Expotech, handling the export of the group's technologies and international joint ventures such as Chance Coaches, and CustomCare, an aftermarket support operation servicing buses delivered by both Wrightbus and other bus manufacturers.

After production of the Volvo B10BLE ceased in 2001, Wrightbus developed the Wright Eclipse body for the new Volvo B7L chassis, which, due to its vertical rear engine, was not popular with many operators. Nevertheless, Wright did not lose custom and many operators such as Ulsterbus switched to the incline-engined Scania L94UB, on a similar Wright Solar body. Another bodywork which resembles the Solar/Eclipse range is the Meridian, which was bodied on the MAN A22 full low-floor single-deck chassis.

Wrightbus' first double-decker bus, the Wright Eclipse Gemini, was launched on the Volvo B7TL chassis in 2001. A similarly styled bus entered service with Arriva London in August 2003 as the Wright Pulsar Gemini on the VDL DB250 chassis. Large operators of Gemini-bodied Wrightbus buses included Arriva, Bus Éireann, the FirstGroup, the Go-Ahead Group, Lothian Buses and National Express' West Midlands, Coventry and Dundee operations.

In November 2004, Wrightbus announced it was returning to producing bodies for minibuses at the Coach & Bus 2004 expo with the launch of the low-floor Satellite body, which was to be built on the Iveco Daily-based Irisbus LoGo 65C17 chassis cowl. The body, capable of seating between 24 and 28 passengers with room for a wheelchair through the application of a drop-centre frame, was expected to be launched in mid-2005. In July 2005, however, Wrightbus announced that the Wright Satellite had been place on 'indefinite hold' in favour of further developing the Wright StreetCar and other Euro IV products.

=== 2010s ===
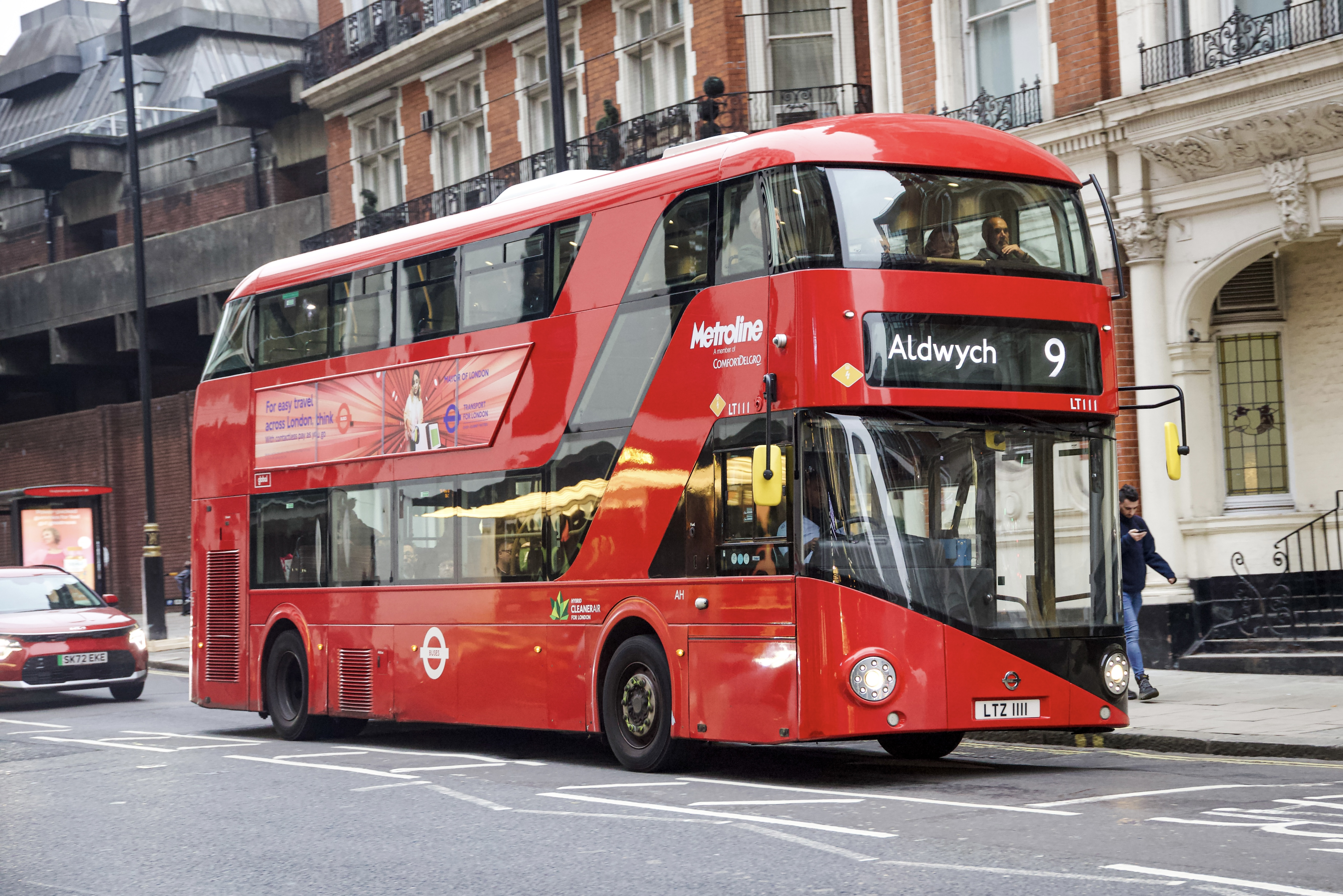
Metroline New Routemaster in London in November 2024

One of the company's most notable products is the New Routemaster London bus, introduced in February 2012 as an update of the AEC Routemaster. Production ended in 2017 when the 1,000th New Routemaster left the production line.

Since May 2013, Wrightbus began building its own chassis, the StreetLite single-decker and StreetDeck double decker. However, they still continue to produce bodywork for the Volvo B5TL, Volvo B5LH and Volvo B8RLE.

In 2016, the Wright SRM was introduced on the Volvo B5LH. It was an adaptation of the New Routemaster body onto Volvo's hybrid chassis at a shorter length of 10.6 metres (35 ft), with only six sold to RATP Dev subsidiary London United that same year.

==== Administration and acquisition by Jo Bamford ====
Between September and October 2019, Wrightbus entered administration with the suspension of 1,300 jobs at its factory. At the time Deloitte was appointed as the company's administrators, Wrightbus was £60 million in debt, with £38.1 million of that debt owed to the Bank of Ireland.

During the six years prior to Wrightbus going into administration, it was reported that Jeff Wright, the owner of the company, had donated £15 million to a church he had founded in 2007, Green Pastures Church. This led to protests on 29 September 2019 which were joined by many of the company's former workers, including members of the Wright family.

On 11 October 2019, a deal was reached in principle between Jo Bamford (son of Anthony Bamford, chairman of the construction equipment manufacturer JCB) and the Wright family for the land used by the factory, a sticking point in negotiations to sell the firm. A deal was made with the administrators eleven days later, with Jo Bamford's Bamford Bus Company concluding a takeover of the company.

Since the takeover of Wrightbus, Bamford has been committed to creating a market for hydrogen buses with a reconfigured StreetDeck that is powered by hydrogen. In 2020, Bamford said he planned to build 3,000 buses of this type by 2024.

=== 2020s ===
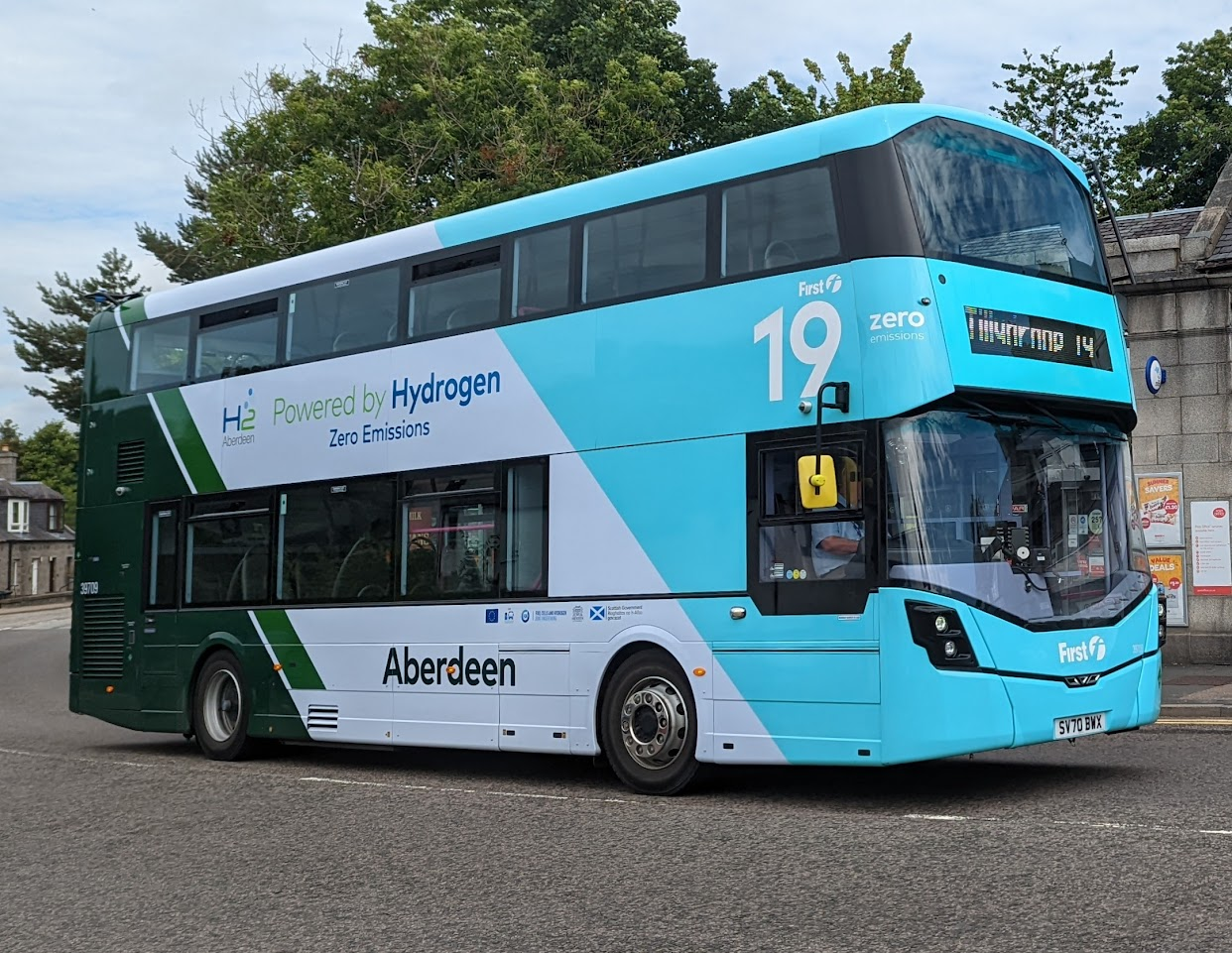
First Aberdeen Wright StreetDeck Hydroliner fuel cell bus in Peterculter in July 2022

Wrightbus has followed two strategies towards achieving zero emission: creating battery-powered and fuel cell (powered by hydrogen) vehicles. Early orders following the introduction of Wright's Electroliner and Hydroliner range included the Go-Ahead Group, who placed orders for fuel cell buses for its Metrobus fleet on the Fastway bus rapid transit service, and Translink of Northern Ireland, who placed an initial order for 38 battery electric buses.

Wrightbus announced in February 2023 that it was planning to build a green hydrogen production facility on its Ballymena site in partnership with Hygen Energy, capable of producing enough hydrogen to fuel up to 300 buses per day with the option to triple its production in line with future demand for the fuel. Funding for the construction of electrolysers at the facility was secured from the first round of the UK government's £37.9 million UK Net Zero Hydrogen Fund in March 2023. Wrightbus was later granted up to £534,000 in funding from the UK government-sponsored Advanced Propulsion Centre fund in September 2023 to develop a driveline based on the GB Kite Hydroliner for a hydrogen fuel cell-powered coach, which will be intended as a functional "technology demonstrator". A driveline demonstrator capable of a range of 1,000 kilometres (620 mi) was unveiled in September 2024 at the Cenex net-zero mobility show in Bedfordshire, with development work on the coach set to complete by 2025 before it takes to the road during 2026.

In June 2024, Wrightbus announced it had formed NewPower, a new subsidiary headquartered at the former Arrival Bus factory in Bicester, Oxfordshire, aimed at facilitating battery electric repowering of existing diesel Wrightbus buses, such as the StreetDeck, Gemini 2 and New Routemaster. At a cost of over £200,000, the repowering process involves the removal of the diesel drivetrain and ensuing fitment of a Voith Electric Drive System coupled with NMC battery packs and a Grayson HVAC system, all capable of being performed over a period of three weeks at a factory capacity of six buses being converted at one time. Wrightbus also announced it had opened a bus refurbishment business a short distance from the NewPower facility, which is aimed to complete external and internal refurbishments of buses following their battery electric conversions.

==== Rightech ====
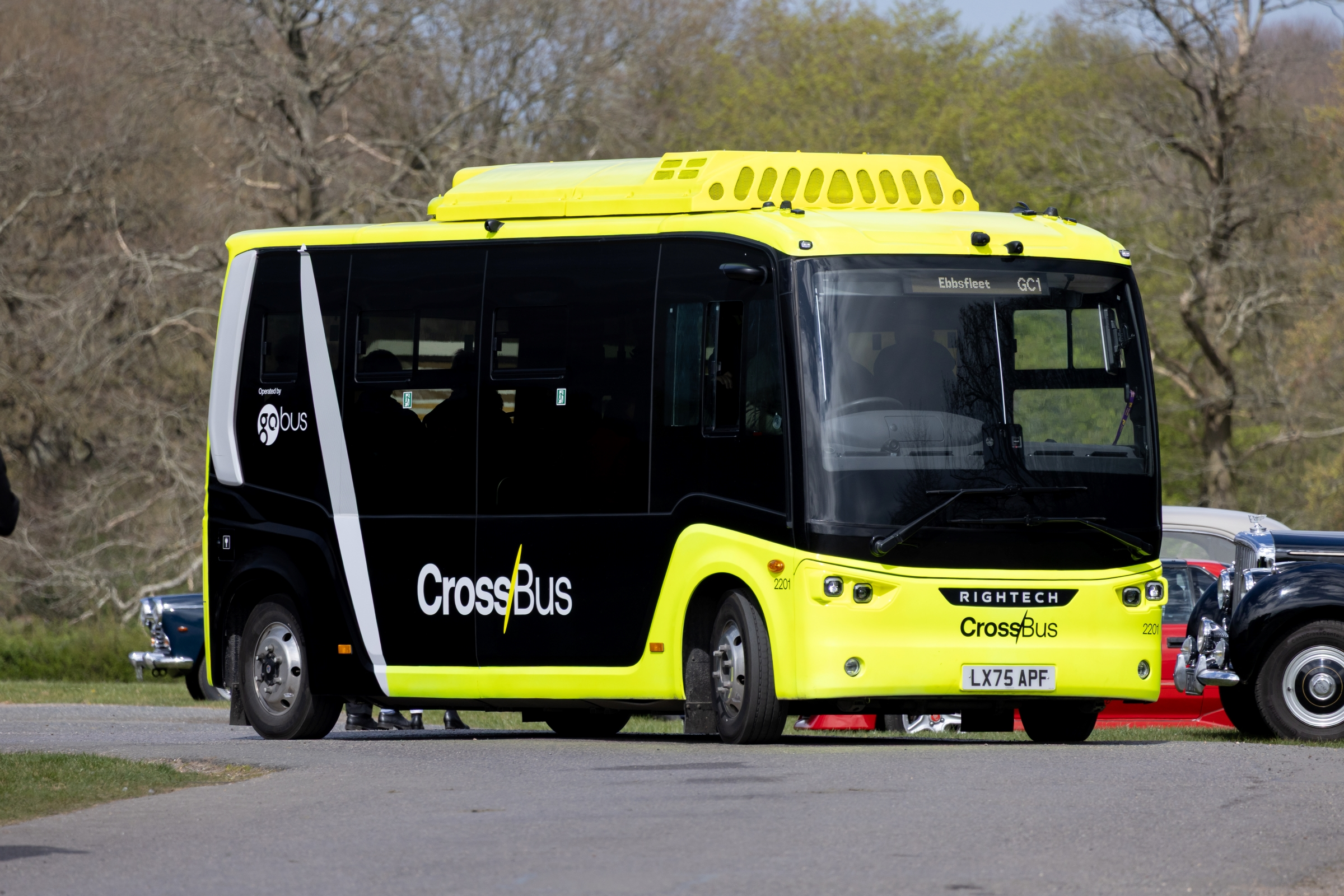
Go-Coach Rightech RB6 at the 2026 South East Bus Festival in Detling

On 29 January 2025, Wrightbus launched its 'Rightech' sub-brand with the announcement of the 6 metres (20 ft) Rightech RB6 and 9 metres (30 ft) RB9 single-deck battery electric buses, produced in collaboration with Chinese bus and coach manufacturer King Long, and entered into truck manufacturing with the additional announcement of the Rightech RT75, a 7.5 tonnes (7.4 long tons; 8.3 short tons) battery electric box truck produced in collaboration with JAC Motors and able to be specified at either a 3.85 metres (12.6 ft) or 4.48 metres (14.7 ft) wheelbase. Each model is available in both left- and right-hand drive variants for the UK and European bus and truck markets.

== Exports ==
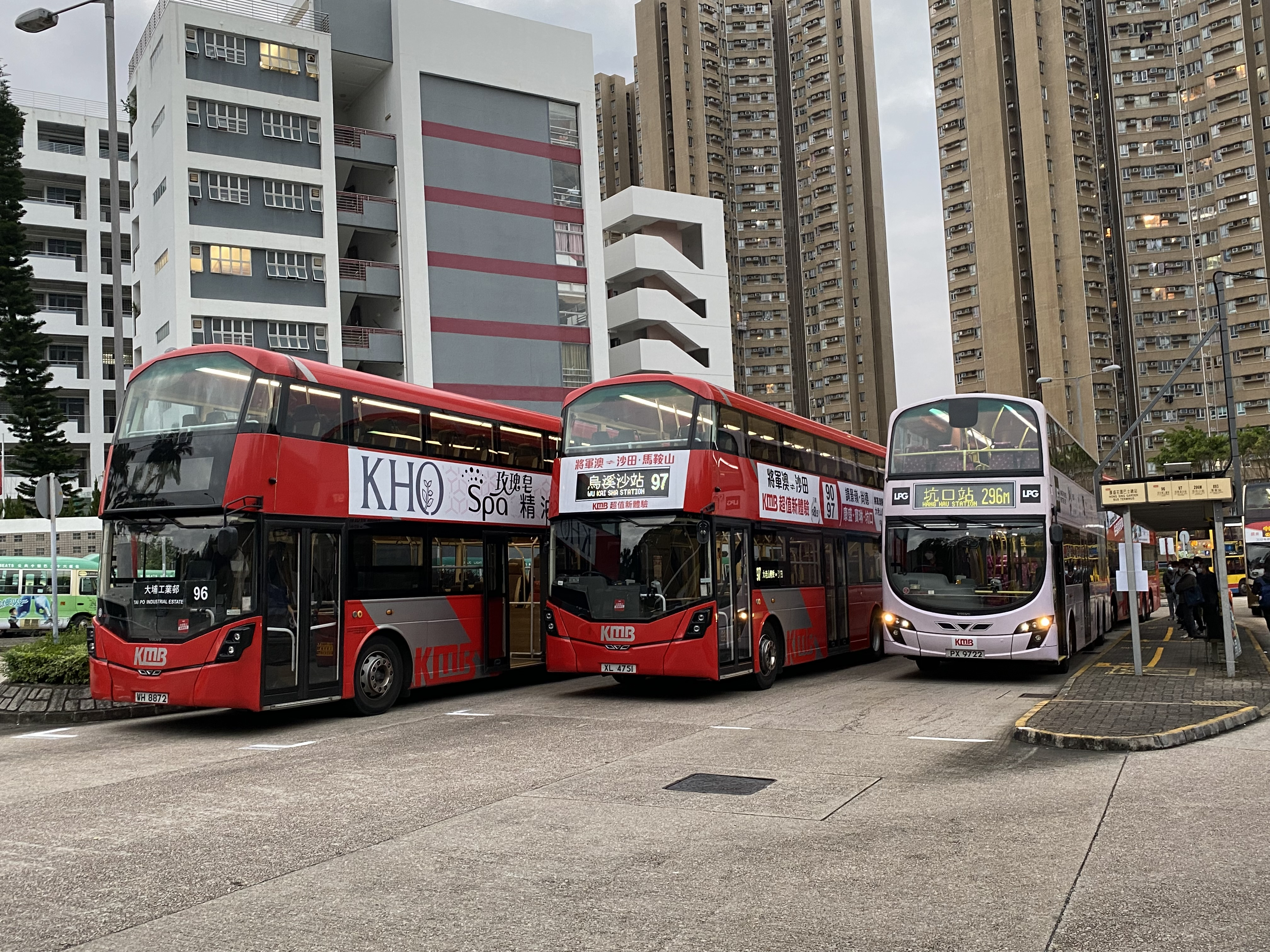
Kowloon Motor Bus Wright Eclipse Gemini bodied double-deckers in Hong Kong

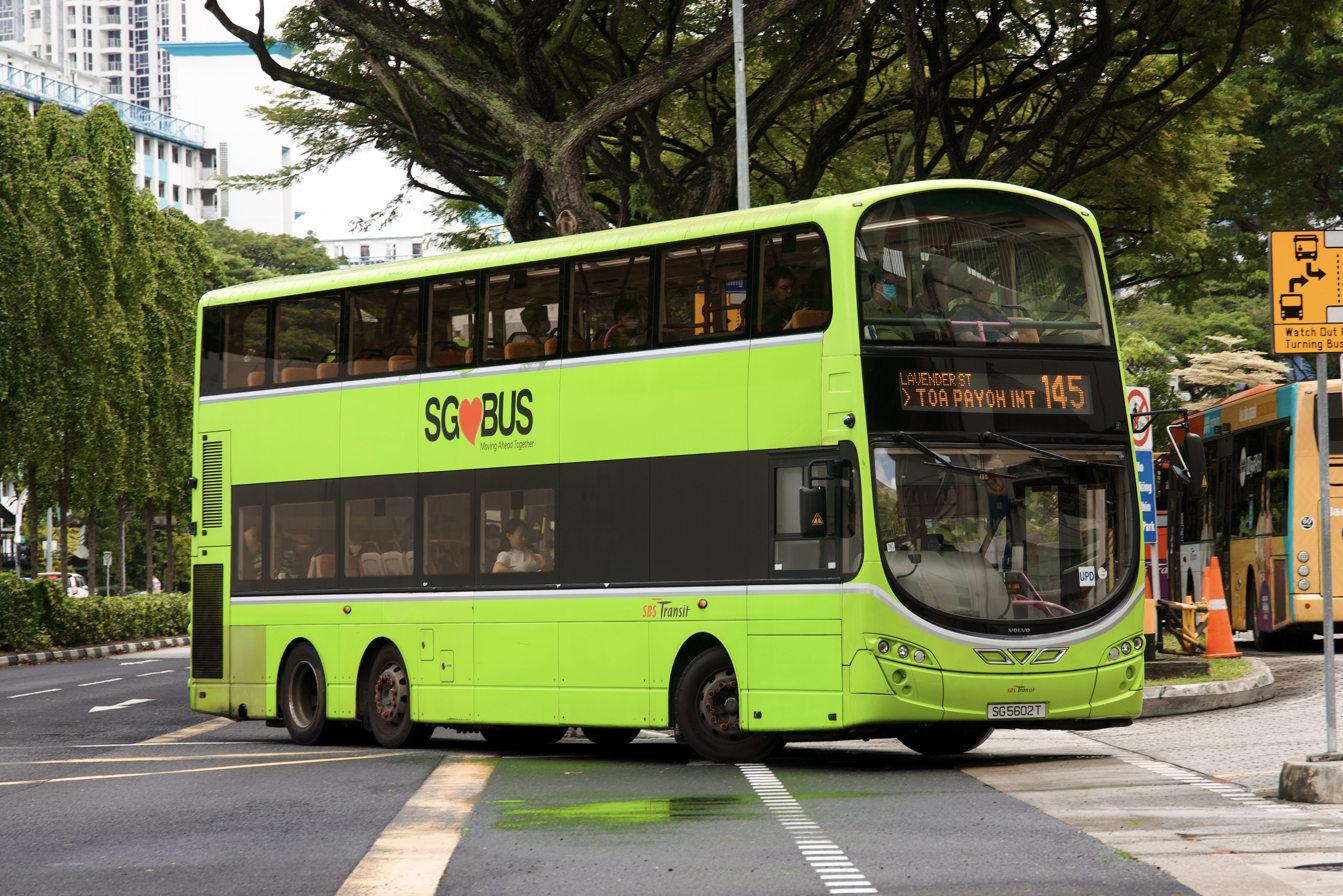
SBS Transit Wright Eclipse Gemini 2 Volvo B9TL in Singapore

In 1997, an order for 25 Wright Crusader-bodied Dennis Darts was delivered to Australian operator ACTION. Between 2003 and 2006, Hong Kong operator Kowloon Motor Bus received a total of 164 Wrightbus three-axle double-deckers; 100 of them were on Volvo Super Olympian and 64 of them were on Volvo B9TL chassis. In 2009, Kowloon Motor Bus had ordered a total of 291 buses, including one demonstrator with two-axle, and all buses were in service in 2012. In 2010, the first of 450 Wright Eclipse Gemini 2-bodied Volvo B9TLs was delivered to SBS Transit, Singapore till end 2012.

In 2011, Wrightbus International was established. A contract was awarded by SBS Transit for 565 Wright Eclipse Gemini 2 bodied Volvo B9TLs and delivered since January 2013 till June 2015. In November 2012, a contract for 50 Wright Eclipse Gemini 2 bodied Volvos was awarded by Kowloon Motor Bus. These were sent in knock-down kit (CKD) form from Northern Ireland and assembled in China and followed by another 85, including two 12.8-metre-long demonstrators. In September 2013, Wrightbus entered into a partnership with Daimler Buses to manufacture buses in Chennai, India.

In March 2014, orders were secured from Hong Kong operators Citybus and New World First Bus for 51 bodies on Volvo B9TL chassis. These were sent in CKD form from Northern Ireland and assembled in Malaysia. In July 2014, SBS Transit ordered a further 415 Eclipse Gemini 2-bodied Volvo B9TLs which will be delivered from August 2015 till 2017, increasing the total to 1,430 by 2017.

== Products ==
=== Current models ===
First South West Wright GB Kite Electroliner in Taunton in October 2025

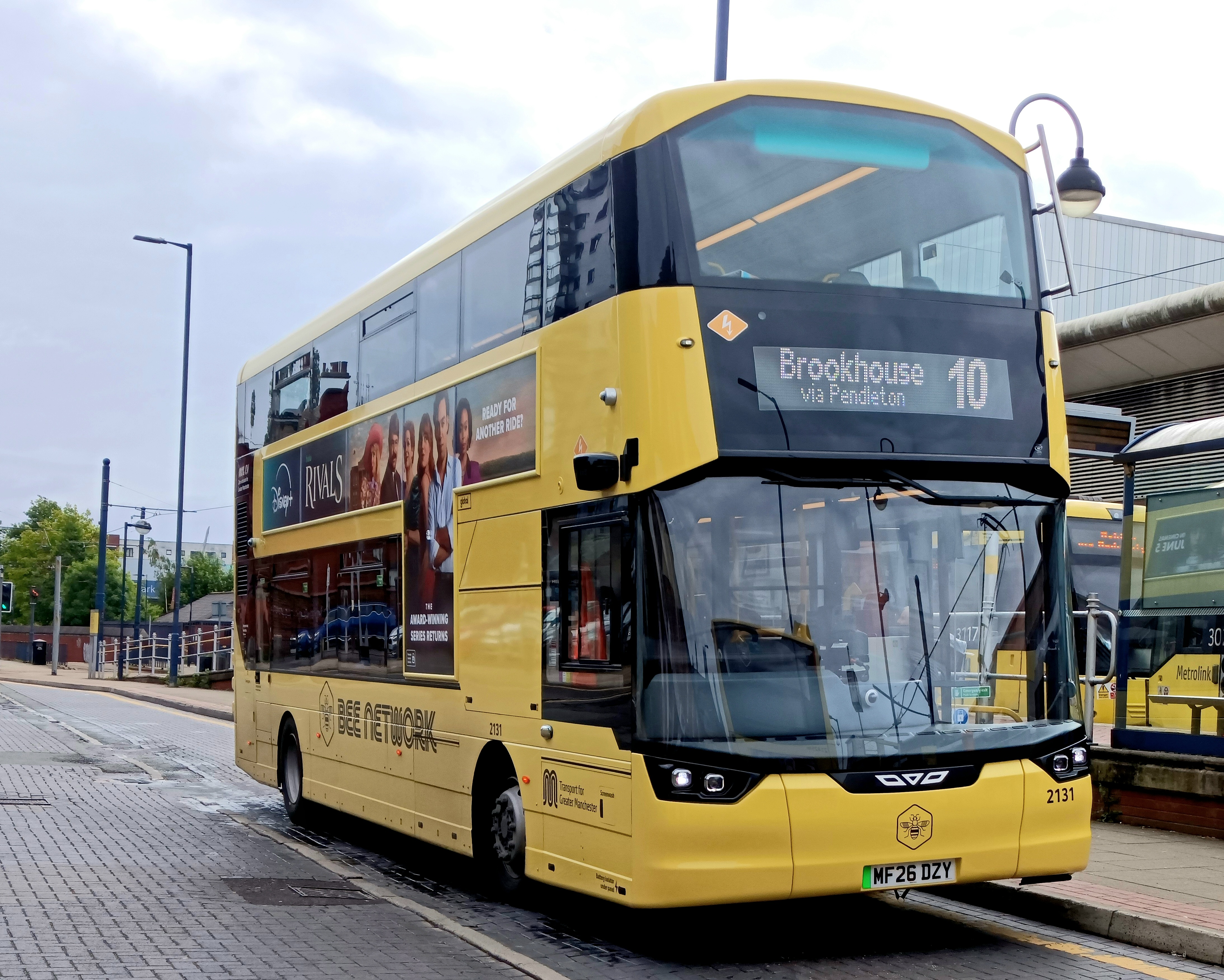
Go North West Bee Network branded Wright StreetDeck Electroliner at Eccles Interchange in May 2026

Name	Chassis	Decks	Notes
Contour	Integral	1	Rebadged King Long coach; diesel propulsion only.
GB Hawk	Integral	1	Diesel propulsion only
GB Kite	Integral	1	Electric or hydrogen propulsion only.
RB6	Integral	1	Produced under Rightech sub-brand; electric propulsion only.
RB9	Integral	1	Produced under Rightech sub-brand; electric propulsion only.
Gemini 3	Volvo B5TL, B5LH, B8L	2	Bodywork on Volvo chassis; Volvo B5LH is a hybrid propulsion chassis
StreetDeck	Integral	2	
RT75	Integral truck	N/A	Produced under Rightech sub-brand; electric propulsion only.

=== Former ===
==== Single deck ====
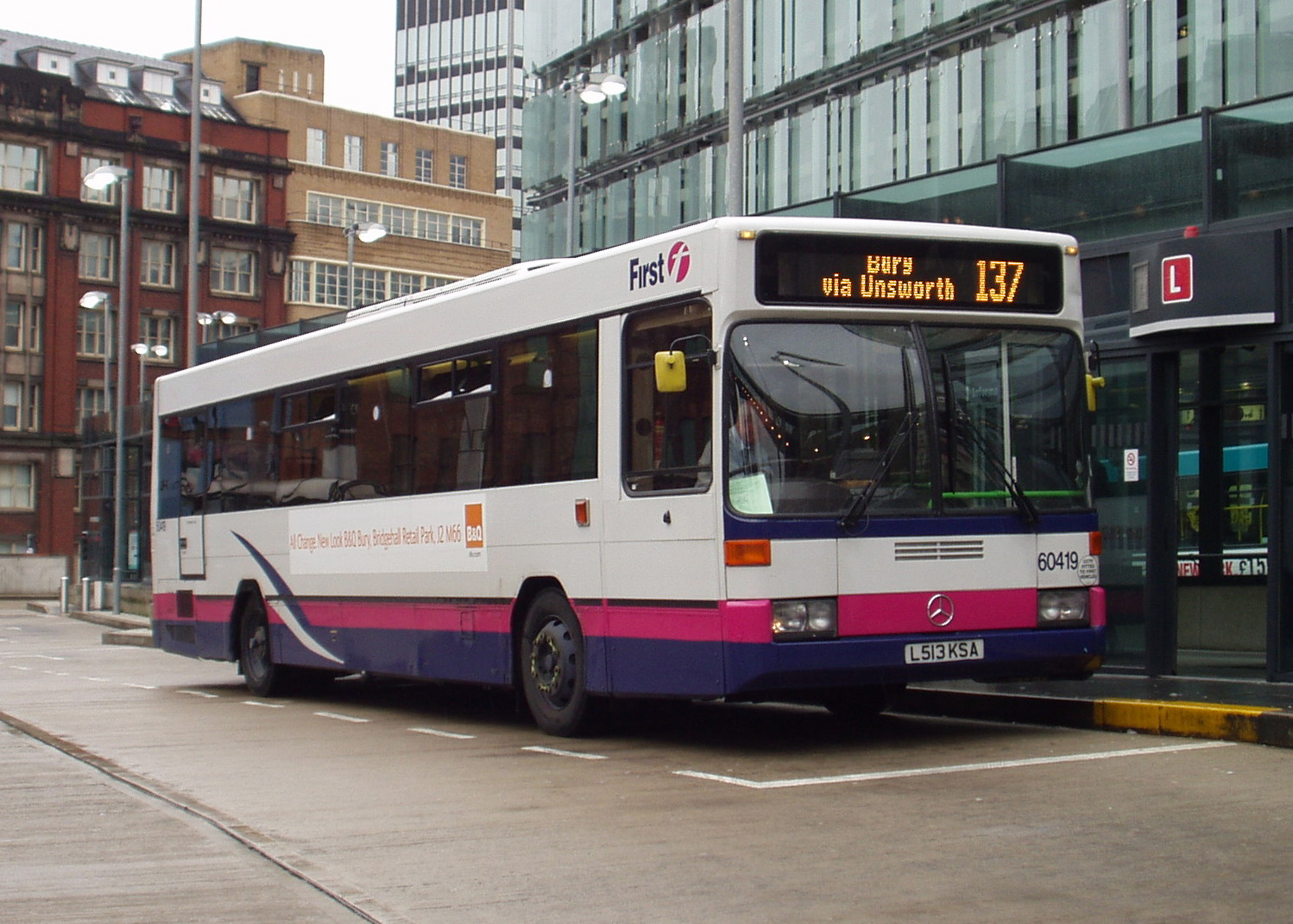
Wright Cityranger bodied Mercedes-Benz O405 at Shudehill Interchange, Manchester in July 2007

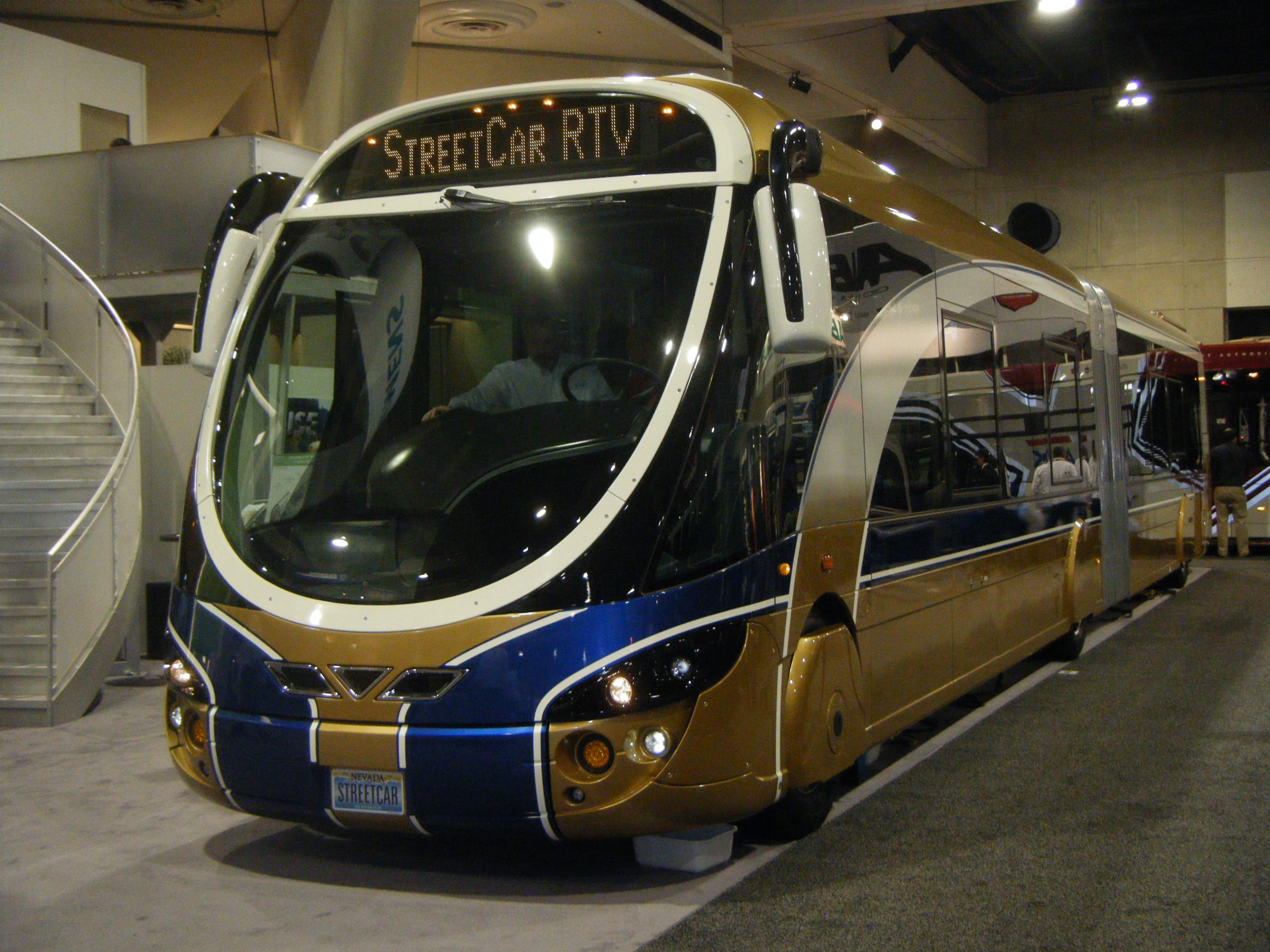
The Wrightbus Streetcar, used on the Las Vegas Strip and Downtown Express (SDX) route

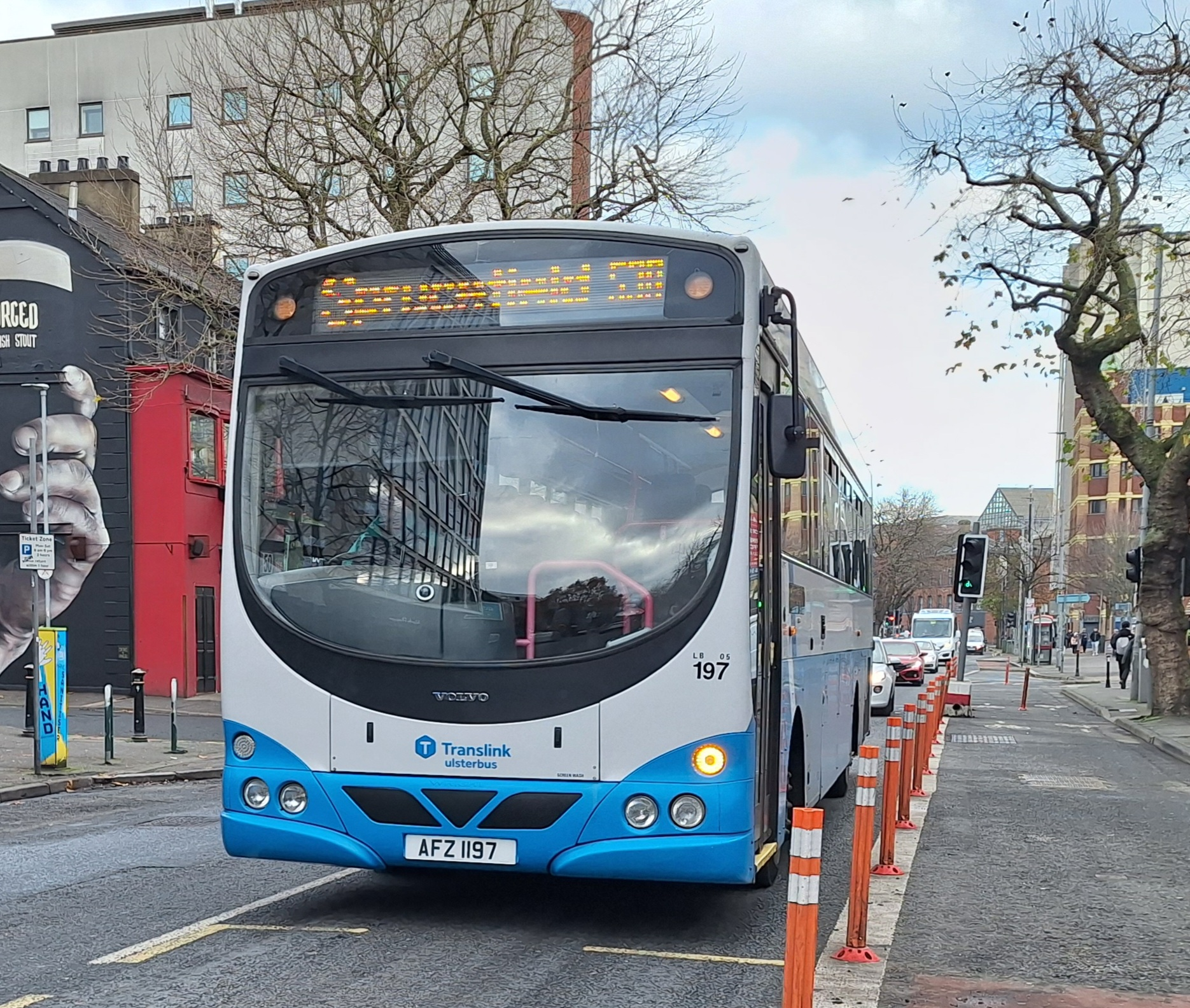
Ulsterbus second batch Wright Eclipse SchoolRun bodied Volvo B7R at Belfast Dublin Road bus stop in November 2023

Name	Chassis	Notes
Axcess-Floline	Scania L94UB	
Axcess-Ultralow	Scania L113CRL	
Cadet	DAF/VDL SB120	Also sold as the Volvo Merit
Cityranger	Mercedes-Benz O405	
Commander	DAF/VDL SB200	
Consort	Leyland 9-13R Roadrunner	Possibly bodied other chassis
Contour	ACE Puma IV; Bedford YNT; Ford R Series; Leyland Tiger; Volvo B10M	Coach body
Crusader	Dennis Dart SLF, Volvo B6LE	
Eclipse Metro	Volvo B7L	
Eclipse Urban, 2 and 3	Volvo B7RLE; Volvo B8RLE	Replaced by the Wright GB Hawk and Wright GB Kite
Eclipse Fusion	Volvo B7LA	Articulated bus
Eclipse Commuter	Volvo B7RLE	
Eclipse SchoolRun	Volvo B7R	
Endeavour	Leyland Tiger, Scania K93	
Electrocity	DAF/VDL SB120	Hybrid bus
Endurance	Volvo B10B, Scania N113CRB	
Fusion	Volvo B10LA	
Handybus	Dennis Dart, Leyland Swift	
Liberator	Volvo B10L	
Meridian	MAN A22	
Nimbus	Mercedes-Benz T2, Renault S75	Minibus
Pathfinder	Dennis Lance SLF, Scania N113CRL	
Pulsar	VDL SB200	Was available in HEV form
Renown	Volvo B10BLE	
Royale	Leyland Leopard	
Solar	Scania L94UB	
Solar Fusion	Scania L94UA	Articulated bus
TT	Bedford chassis	
StreetAir	Integral	Fully electric-powered midibus, can be DF (door-forward, chassis based on StreetDeck) or WF (wheel-forward, based on StreetLite)
StreetCar	Volvo B7LA, Hess	Articulated bus
StreetLite	Integral	Available in DF (door-forward, door is in part of the bus extending in front of front wheels) or WF (wheel-forward, wheels are right at the front and door is behind them)
StreetVibe	Integral	A shorter and narrower version of the StreetLite launched in 2014 to compete with the Optare Solo SR Slimline (wheel-forward)
Urbanranger	Mercedes-Benz OH1416	

==== Double deck ====
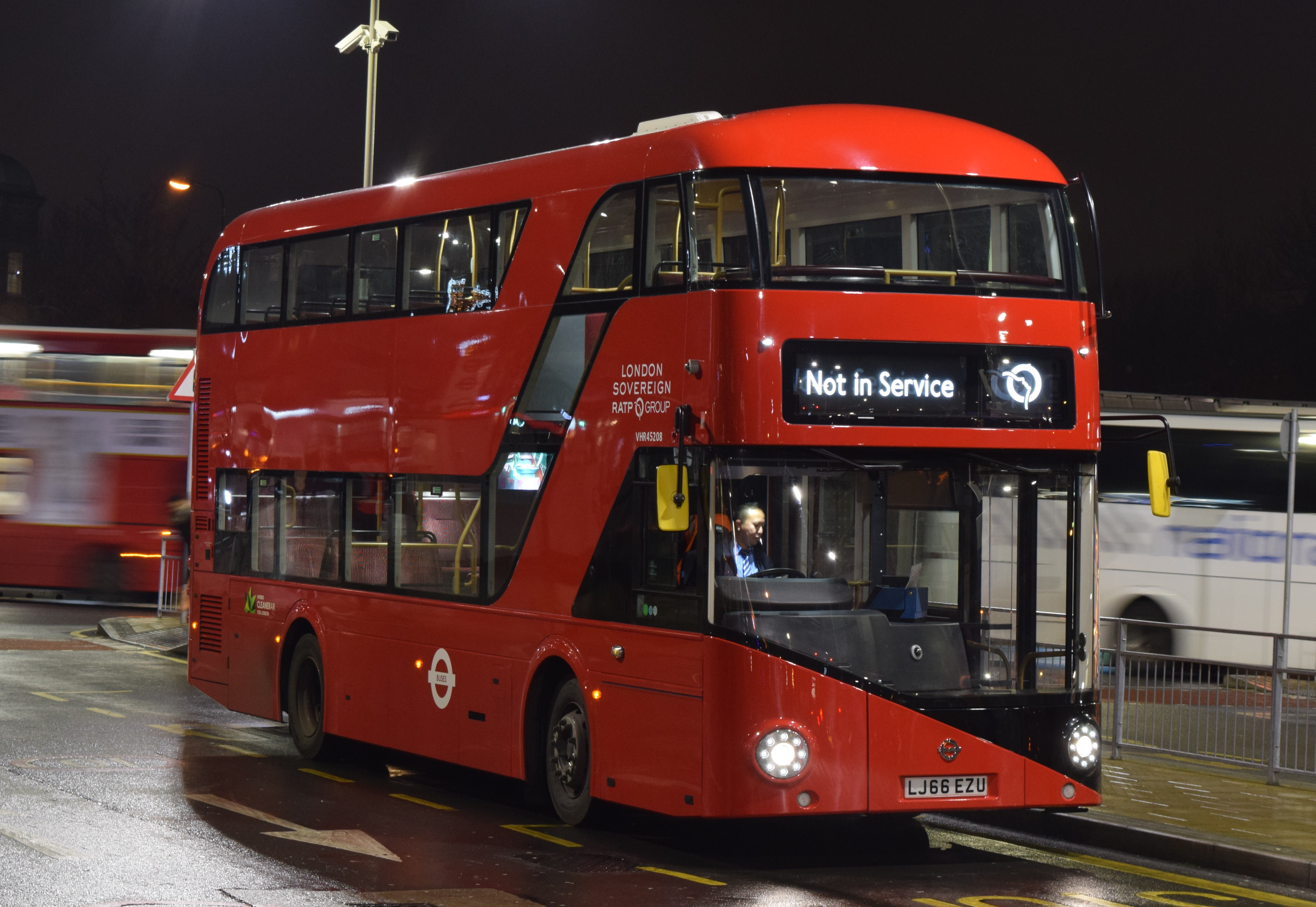
London Sovereign Wright SRM bodied Volvo B5LH at Golders Green station in December 2016

Name	Chassis	Notes
Eclipse Gemini	Volvo B7TL, two-axle B9TL & B5LH	
Eclipse Gemini 2	Volvo B9TL, B8L, B5LH	Production for two-axle version ceased in 2013/2014
Explorer	Volvo Super Olympian	
Gemini 2	Integral with VDL modules	Comes in DL & HEV variants
Pulsar Gemini	DAF/VDL DB250	
Pulsar Gemini HEV	VDL DB250	Hybrid
New Routemaster	Integral	Hybrid bus produced exclusively for TfL between 2012 and 2017
SRM	Volvo B5LH	A more basic spin-off of the New Routemaster with fewer distinctive features
