= Wright Axcess =

Low-entry bus bodies on Scania L113CRL and L94UB chassis

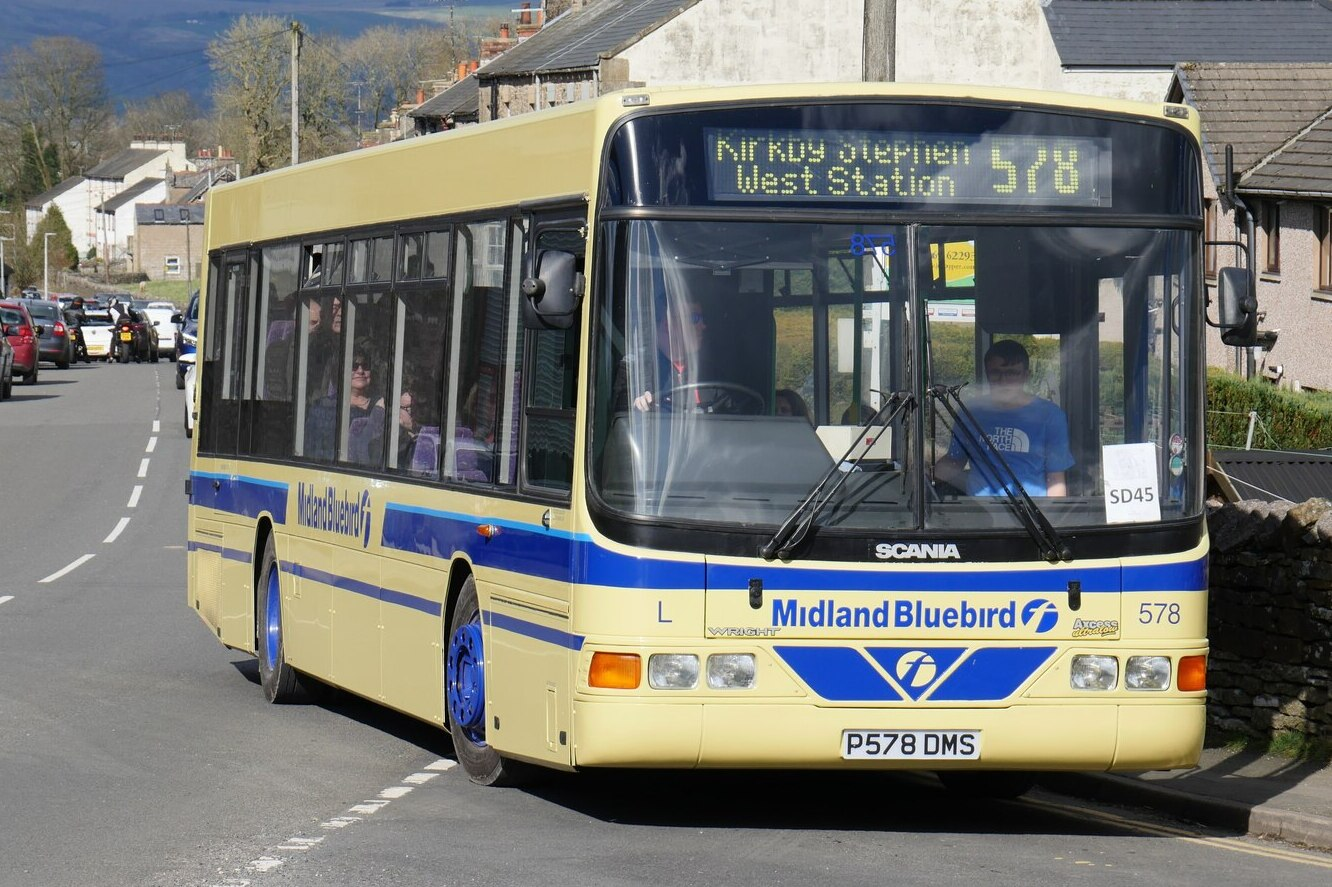
- Preserved First Midland Bluebird Wright Axcess-Ultralow bodied Scania L113CRL in Kirkby Stephen in 2024

Overview
- Manufacturer: Wrightbus
- Production: 1995–2001
- Assembly: Ballymena, Northern Ireland
- Designer: Trevor Erskine

Body and chassis
- Doors: 1
- Floor type: Low entry
- Chassis: Ultralow: Scania L113CRL; Floline: Scania L94UB

Powertrain
- Engine: Ultralow: Scania DSC11-71; Floline: Scania DSC9-11
- Capacity: 47 seated
- Transmission: ZF Ecomat 4HP500

Dimensions
- Length: 11.90 m (39 ft 1 in)
- Width: 2.50 m (8 ft 2 in)
- Height: 3.00 m (9 ft 10 in)

Chronology
- Predecessor: Wright Endurance; Wright Pathfinder
- Successor: Wright Solar

The Wright Axcess was a series of two low-entry single-decker bus bodies built on Scania bus chassis by Wrightbus. The Wright Axcess-Ultralow was manufactured Scania L113CRL between 1995 and 1998, later succeeded by the Wright Axcess-Floline on Scania L94UB chassis between 1998 and 2001.

== Design ==
The Wright Axcess-Ultralow was introduced in 1995 as a low-cost replacement for Wright Endurance and Wright Pathfinder bodies based on the step-entrance Scania N113 and low-entry N113CRL chassis respectively, developed to fit the recommendations of the Disabled Persons Transport Advisory Committee (DiPTAC) on improving wheelchair and pushchair access. Like the Endurance and Pathfinder, the Axcess-Ultralow body was constructed using an Alusuisse bolted aluminium frame and with bonded window glazing, and internally, featured a 320 millimetres (13 in) low single entrance step, capable of being lowered to 200 millimetres (7.9 in) at the kerbside via the 'kneeling' function of the chassis. This was followed by a 780 millimetres (31 in) central gangway between both front axles and three 200 millimetres (7.9 in) steps towards the rear seats of the bus.

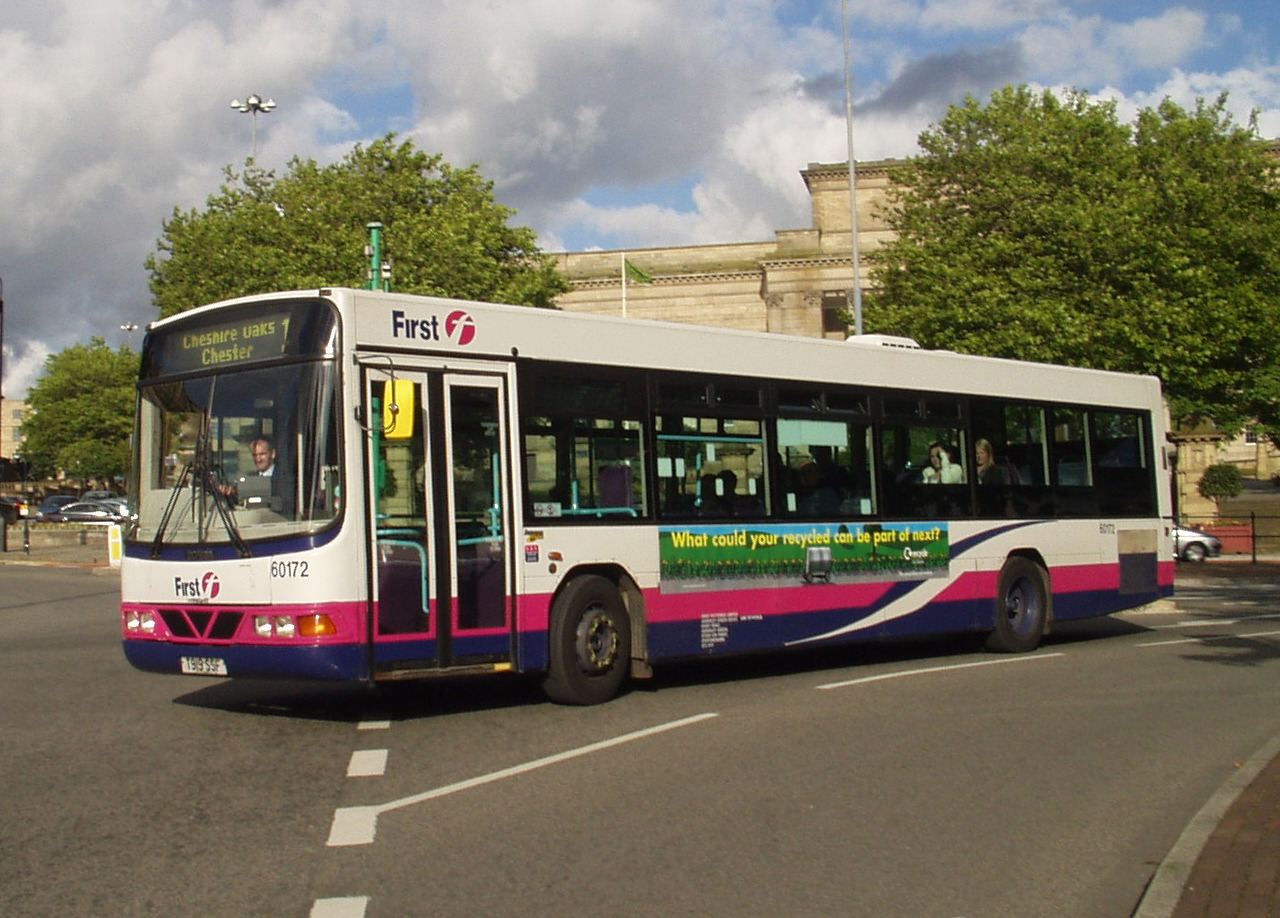
First Chester & The Wirral Wright Axcess-Floline bodied Scania L94UB in Liverpool in June 2007

The Axcess-Ultralow was succeeded by the Wright Axcess-Floline in 1997 on the Scania L94UB chassis. Launched at the Coach & Bus 97 expo, most of the Floline's changes were found internally, most notably being the 'Floline' sloped floor system, originally launched on the Renown on Volvo B10BLE, that removed the need for multiple steps towards the rear of the interior. Additional strength applied to the body's framework for implementing the Floline concept allowed the bus to be specified with bonded gasket windows. The Floline was succeeded in 2000 by the low-floor 'Millennium Design' Wright Solar body on the same Scania L94UB chassis.

== Operators ==
=== Axcess-Ultralow ===
An initial batch of 20 Wright Axcess-Ultralows were delivered to Rider York in June 1995 for service on the York park and ride equipped with luggage ramps supplied from Marks & Spencer. These buses eventually became part of the FirstBus fleet, who were popular customers of the Wright Axcess-Ultralow, especially for its Scottish operations. A majority of the group's Axcess-Ultralows were delivered to First Greater Glasgow from 1996 onwards, while twelve were delivered to FifeFirst in June 1997, and eight were delivered to its Midland Bluebird and Lowland operations during 1997. Elsewhere, Axcess-Ultralows were delivered to Kingfisher Huddersfield, First Crosville, and the group's Eastern Counties, Northampton and Leicester operations.

Twenty Axcess-Ultralows were delivered to MTL Trust Holdings for its Merseybus operations in 1996, while ten Axcess-Ultralows were also delivered to Kentish Bus in late 1994, part of a wider investment by Kent County Council into improving bus stops and shelters as well as providing route information for service 480 between Dartford and Gravesend. Six Axcess-Ultralows were delivered to Chester City Transport for park and ride services in late 1997, and five Axcess-Ultralows were delivered to Nottingham City Transport between 1995 and early 1996.

Five Axcess-Ultralows were delivered to Bullocks Coaches of Cheadle in 1995 for use on route 42 between Piccadilly Gardens and Stockport bus station, followed by another five being delivered to North Western's StarLine subsidiary for service between Altrincham, Sale, Wythenshawe and Manchester Airport. The purchases of both batches of these buses were funded from low-floor grants provided by the Greater Manchester Passenger Transport Authority. A further 29 Axcess-Ultralows were supplied to North Western and the StarLine subsidiary during 1996.

=== Axcess-Floline ===
All but 34 of the 276 Axcess-Flolines produced were delivered to FirstBus operators, with some early examples built concurrently alongside the group's orders for the Axcess-Ultralow. The first production Axcess-Floline was delivered to First Greater Glasgow following the Coach & Bus 97 expo.
