= Wright Pathfinder =

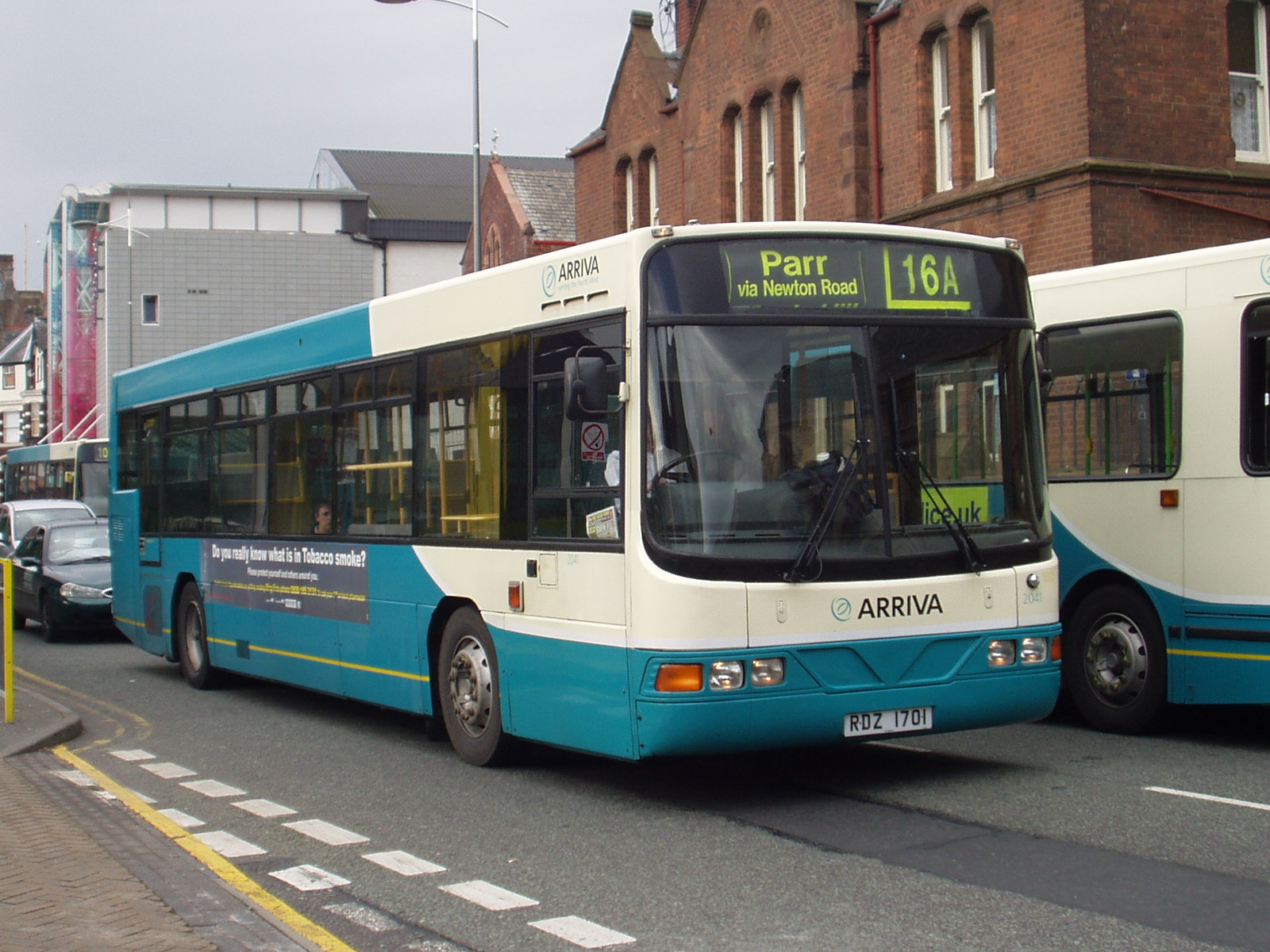
- Arriva North West & Wales Wrightbus Pathfinder bodied Scania N113CRL in St Helens

Overview
- Manufacturer: Wrightbus
- Production: 1993 - 1995
- Assembly: Ballymena, Northern Ireland

Body and chassis
- Doors: 1 or 2
- Floor type: Low floor Low entry
- Chassis: Dennis Lance SLF; Scania N113CRL

Powertrain
- Engine: Cummins (Dennis Lance SLF); Scania (Scania N113CRL)
- Capacity: 31 to 42 seated

Dimensions
- Length: 11.95 metres
- Width: 2.50 metres
- Height: 3.00 metres

Chronology
- Successor: Wright Axcess-Ultralow

The Wright Pathfinder was a low entry and low floor single-decker bus body built on Dennis Lance SLF and Scania N113CRL chassis by Wrightbus between 1993 and 1995.

== History ==
Of the 95 Pathfinders produced, London Regional Transport subsidiaries purchased 38 on Dennis Lance chassis and all 30 Scania N113CRLs. They were London's first low-floor buses. The first examples were operated by London United on route 120 and CentreWest on route 222.

Other purchasers (all on Dennis Lances) included Badgerline, London & Country and Northern General. The Pathfinder was succeeded in 1995 by the Axcess-Ultralow.
