= Wright Endeavour =

High-floor coach bus

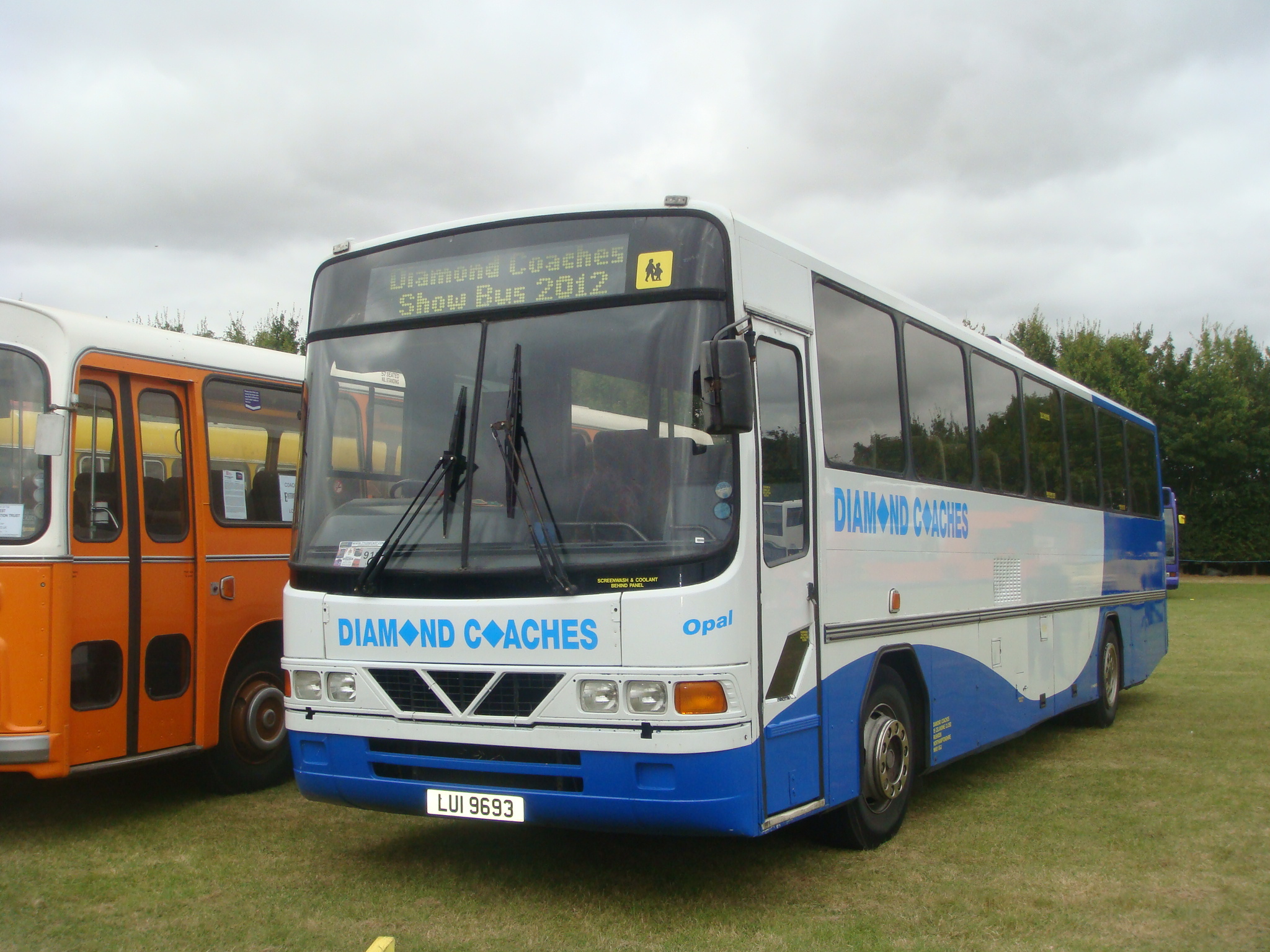
- Wright Endeavour bodied Leyland Tiger in September 2012

Overview
- Manufacturer: Wrightbus
- Production: 1992-1993
- Assembly: Ballymena, Northern Ireland

Body and chassis
- Doors: 1
- Floor type: Step entrance
- Chassis: Leyland Tiger

Dimensions
- Length: 12.0 metres
- Width: 2.5 metres
- Height: 3.5 metres

The Wright Endeavour was a high-floor bus body built by Wrightbus from 1992 to 1993. The body was the first in the range of Wrightbus body style which were built until 2013. Only 25 were produced, all on Leyland Tiger chassis for Ulsterbus.
