= Scania 3-series (bus) =

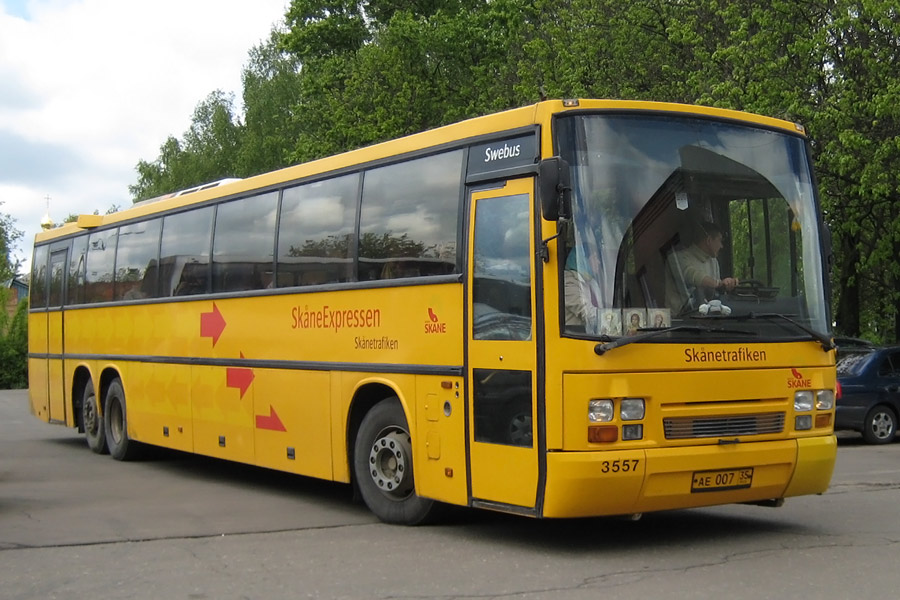
- Carrus Fifty bodied Scania K113TLB in Russia.

Overview
- Manufacturer: Scania
- Production: 1988-1999
- Assembly: Sweden: Södertälje, Katrineholm; Brazil: São Bernardo do Campo; Argentina: Tucumán

Body and chassis
- Class: Bus chassis
- Body style: Single-decker bus Single-decker coach Double-decker bus Articulated bus
- Doors: 1 to 4
- Floor type: Step entrance

Powertrain
- Engine: 8.5 L DS9/DSC9 I6 (diesel); 11.0 L DS11/DSC11 I6 (diesel)

Chronology
- Predecessor: Scania 2-series
- Successor: Scania 4-series

The Scania 3-series bus range was introduced by Scania in 1988 and was superseded by the 4-series bus range in 1999.

== Model designations ==
The model designation breakdown is as follows:

Main type

- F: chassis with engine located longitudinally in front of the front axle
- S: chassis with engine located longitudinally above the front axle
- K: chassis with engine located longitudinally behind the rear axle
- L: chassis with engine located longitudinally behind the rear axle, inclined 60° leftward
- N: chassis with transverse engine located behind the rear axle
- CN: complete bus based on N-chassis
- CK: complete bus based on K-chassis
- CL: complete bus based on L-chassis

Engine series

- 9: DS9 or DSC9 series 8.5-litre engine
- 11: DS11 or DSC11 series 11-litre engine

Development code

- 3: third generation

Chassis type

- A: chassis for articulated bus
- C: chassis for single-decker, two-axle bus
- D: chassis for double-decker bus
- N: F-chassis for heavy-duty execution
- T: chassis for single-decker or double-decker bus with trailing axle

Steering wheel location

- L: left-hand drive
- R: right-hand drive

Axle/suspension configuration

- A: K-chassis: independent front suspension
- B: K-chassis: rigid front axle, N-chassis: independent front suspension
- L: N-chassis: rigid front axle

So K113TLA would be a left-hand drive tri-axle coach with independent front suspension, while L113CRL would be a right-hand drive two-axle citybus.

== Scania F93/F113 ==
The F93 and F113 chassis had the engine mounted in front of the front axle. These models were not sold in Europe. These were made and sold in Argentina (only the F113) and Brazil (both models).

== Scania K93/K113 ==
The K93 and K113 were the most common chassis for coaches, with a longitudinally rear-mounted engine.

It was even available as the rare quad-axle K113TRB in Australia.

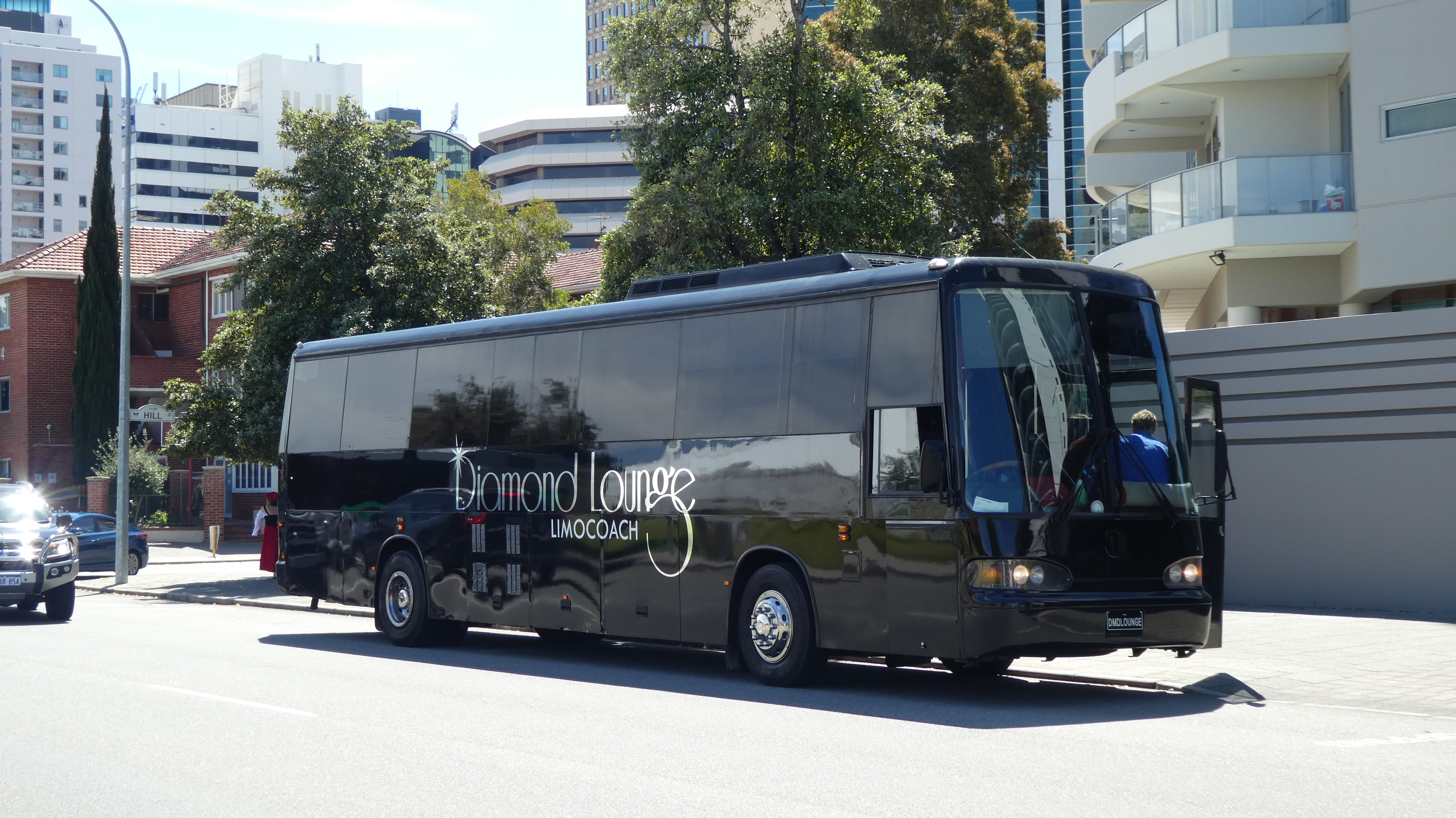
Scania K93CRB

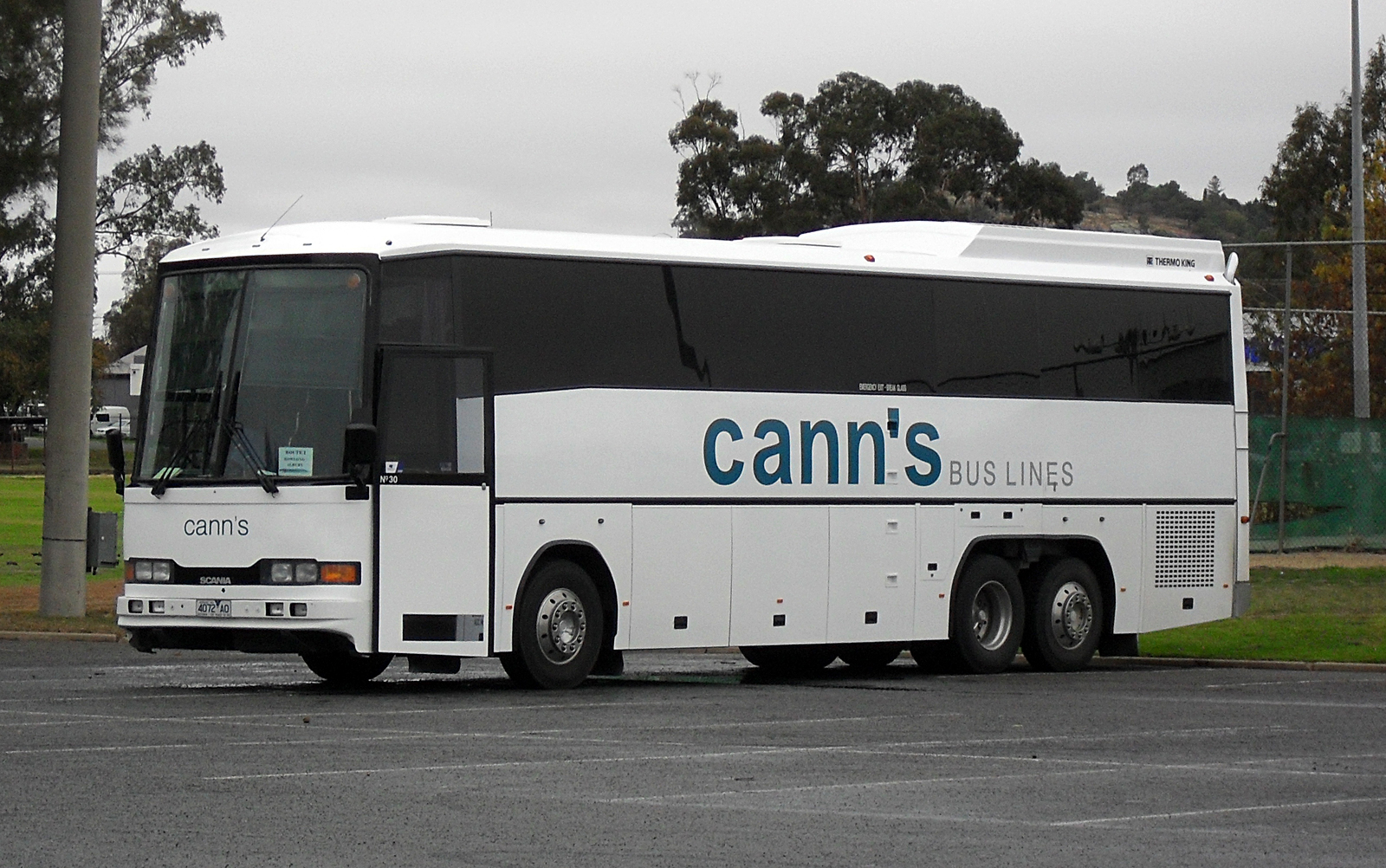
Scania K113TR

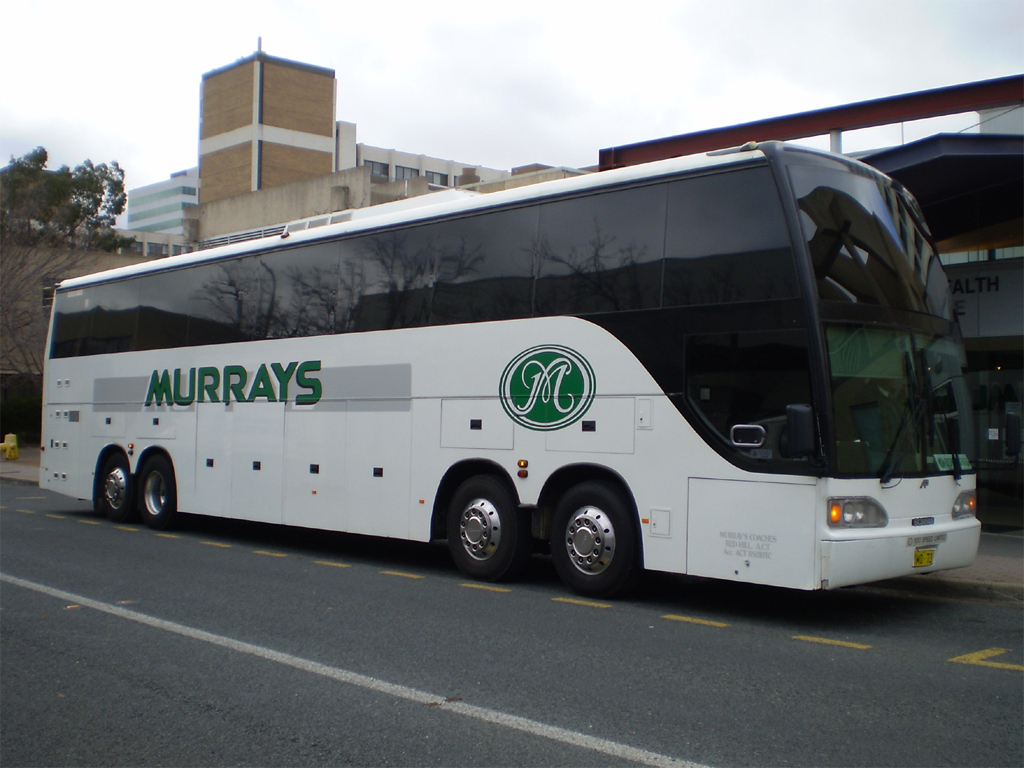
Murrays Austral Pacific bodied Scania K113TRBL 14.5-metre quad-axle coach in Canberra, Australia

== Scania S113 ==
The S113 chassis had the engine mounted above the front axle. It was not sold in Europe. The S113 was discontinued in 1993.
