= Optare Prisma =

Single-deck bus body on Mercedes-Benz O405 chassis

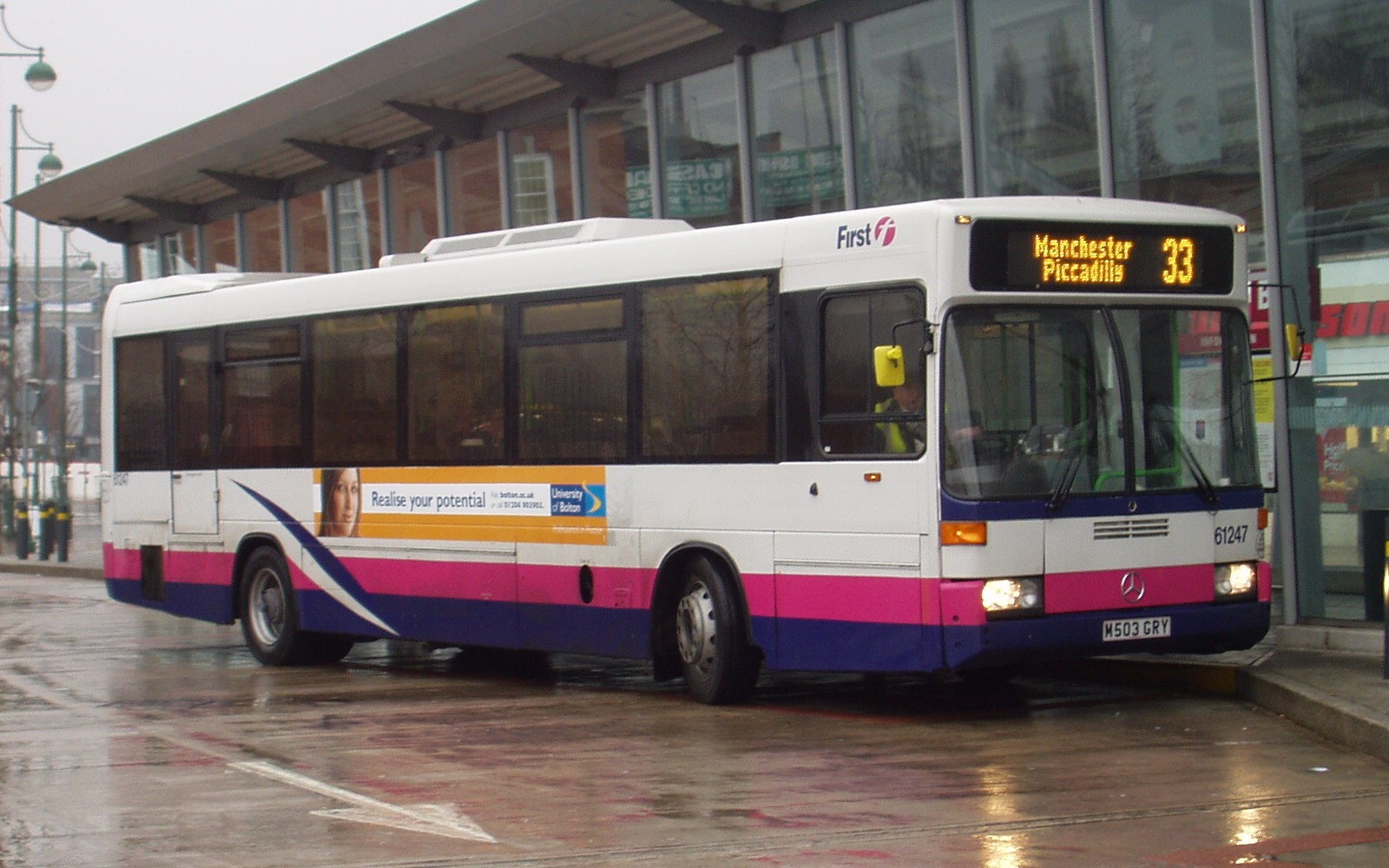
- First Manchester Optare Prisma bodied Mercedes-Benz O405 at Eccles Interchange in December 2007

Overview
- Manufacturer: Optare
- Production: 1995–1998
- Assembly: Cross Gates, Leeds, West Yorkshire, England

Body and chassis
- Doors: 1
- Floor type: Step entrance
- Chassis: Mercedes-Benz O405

Powertrain
- Capacity: 49–54 seated, 23 standing

Dimensions
- Length: 11.6 metres (38 ft)
- Width: 2.5 metres (8 ft 2 in)
- Height: 3.1 metres (10 ft)

The Optare Prisma was a single-decker bus body that was fitted to the Mercedes-Benz O405 chassis, produced between 1995 and 1998, when it was discontinued in favour of the integral Optare Excel low-floor bus.

== Design ==
The Optare Prisma body was constructed on the O405 chassis with an OM447H 157 kW (211 hp) engine, and was built with Alusuisse aluminium framework, retaining a Mercedes-Benz built front cowl and destination display as standard. The sides and back end of the body, however, followed the styling of other Optare products at that time, such as the Delta and Vecta. The Prisma was also designed with the ability to have equipment for use on a guided busway fitted, with a demonstrator operated by Stagecoach Busways in 1996 being fitted with an AEG electronic guidance system.

Capable of seating up to 54 passengers, to meet Disabled Persons Transport Advisory Committee (DiPTAC) accessibility recommendations, the Prisma has a 320 millimetres (13 in) step at the entrance door, capable of being reduced to 240 millimetres (9.4 in) with a kneeling front air suspension. The passenger compartment could be optioned with three further low steps towards the rear of the bus or a ramped floor towards the rear. Gasket-glazed tinted side windows were fitted as standard.

== Operators ==
The most popular operator of Optare Prismas was the GRT Group, who took delivery of a total of 35 Prismas for its main Grampian Regional Transport subsidiary between 1995 and 1997, the first ten of which were equipped with double-glazed windows and air conditioning, as well as ten for its SMT "Diamond" services in Edinburgh, and ten for the Leicester Citybus subsidiary. After the company had rebranded to FirstBus, subsidiaries First Midland Bluebird and Lowland took further deliveries of Prismas.

Another large operator was North East Bus subsidiary Tees & District, who took delivery of 25 Prismas in late 1995, followed by East Yorkshire Motor Services, who took delivery of 16 Prismas between 1996 and 1998; three delivered to the operator from stock in 1998 were the last Optare Primsas produced. Smaller operators of Prismas included Sargeants of Kingston upon Thames, the first new full-size bus delivered to the company since World War II, Black Prince Buses of Morley, the Tillingbourne Bus Company of Cranleigh, MacEwan of Dumfries, and Rhondda Buses.
