= VDL DB250 =

Twin-axle double-decker bus chassis

DAF/VDL DB250
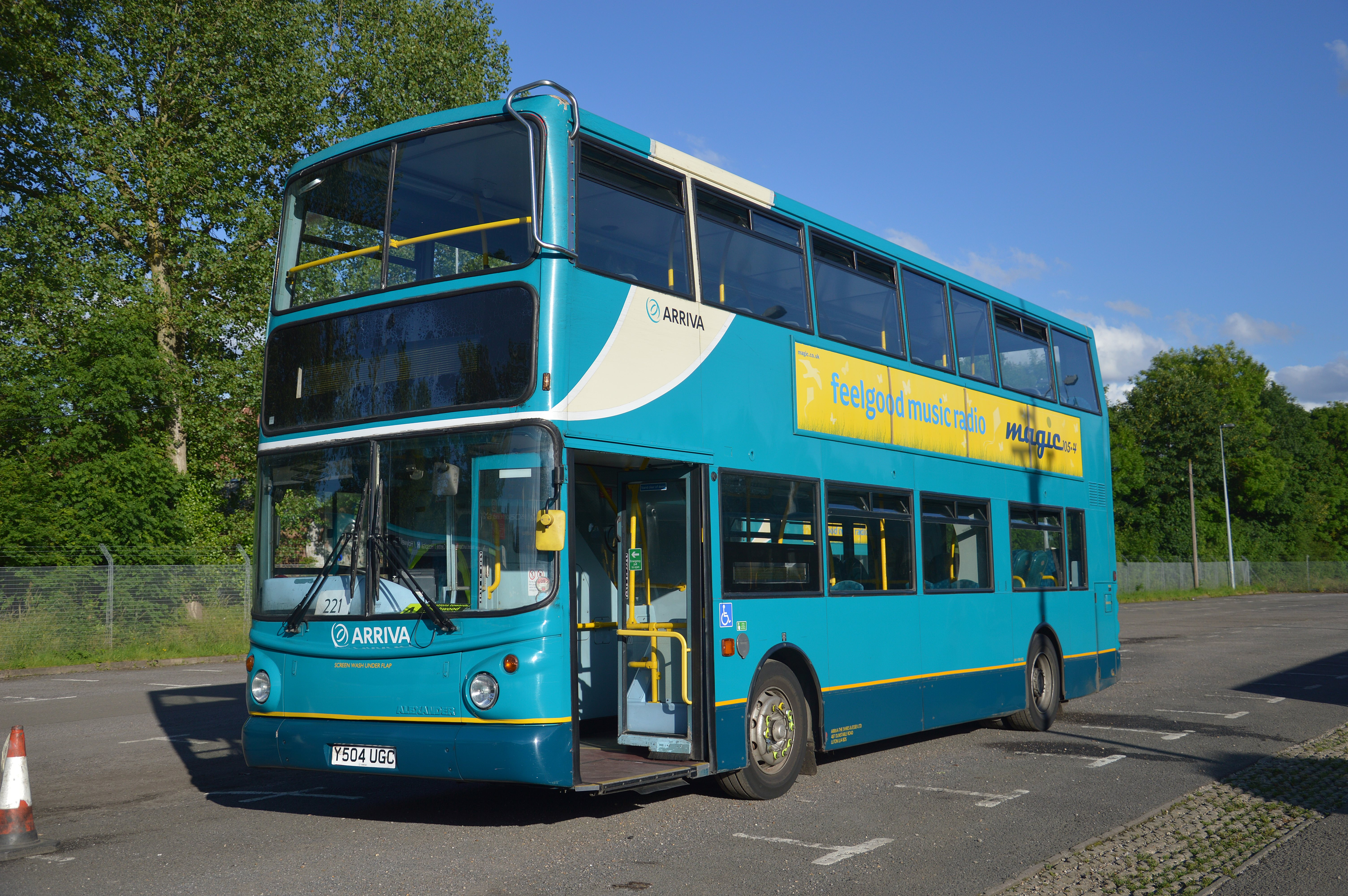
- Arriva Shires & Essex Alexander ALX400 bodied DB250LF at Northwood tube station in 2014

Overview
- Manufacturer: DAF / VDL
- Production: 1991–2007
- Assembly: Eindhoven, Netherlands

Body and chassis
- Doors: 1 or 2
- Floor type: Step entrance DE23; Low floor DE02

Powertrain
- Engine: DAF ATi RS 8.6 litre DAF Paccar PS 9.2 litre
- Transmission: Voith DIWA.3 851.3; Voith DIWA.3 854.3; ZF Ecomat 4HP500; ZF Ecomat 5HP500

Chronology
- Successor: VDL DB300

The VDL DB250 (originally the DAF DB250) is a twin-axle double-decker bus chassis manufactured by VDL Bus & Coach.

== DB250 ==
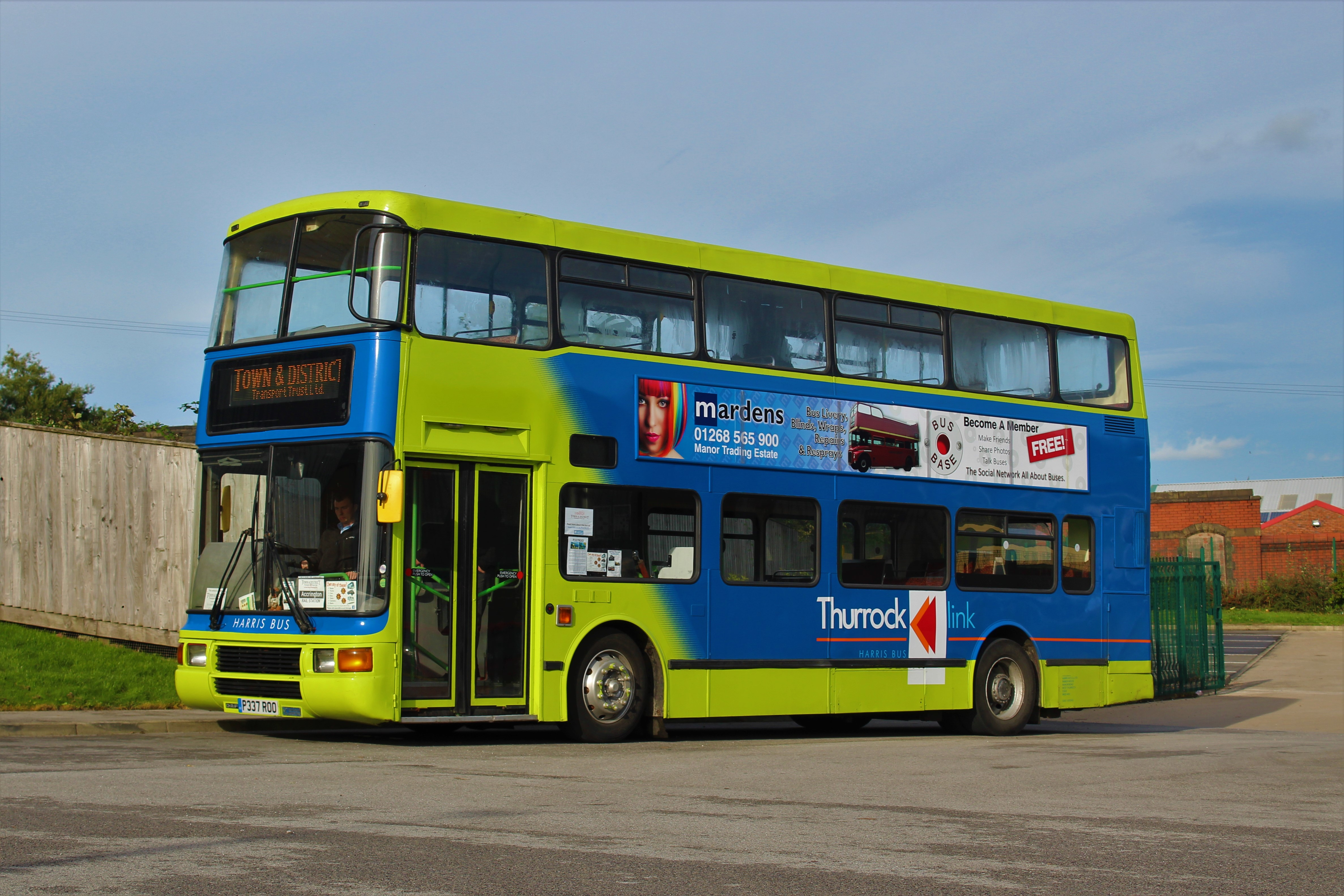
Preserved Harris Bus DB250 with Northern Counties Palatine II bodywork

The DAF DB250 was launched in October 1991 and originally only available with Optare Spectra bodywork with 260 built, mainly for operators in the United Kingdom.

25 DAF DB250s with Optare Spectra bodywork were delivered to London Buses in 1992, with all but one delivered to the London Central subsidiary to a single door arrangement; Metroline received a single dual door example for evaluating replacements for MCW Metrobuses on route 16. Capital Logistics also received a delayed order of six dual door Spectras in 1999 for their operation of route 60.

31 left-hand drive examples were exported to Turkey in 1994, with 26 being delivered to IETT in Istanbul and the remaining five being delivered to İzulaş in İzmir.

The DAF DB250 later became available with Northern Counties Palatine II bodywork in 1994. Cowie London purchased 13 Palatine IIs on the DB250 chassis, while Harris Bus would also acquire fleets of DB250s.

== DB250LF ==
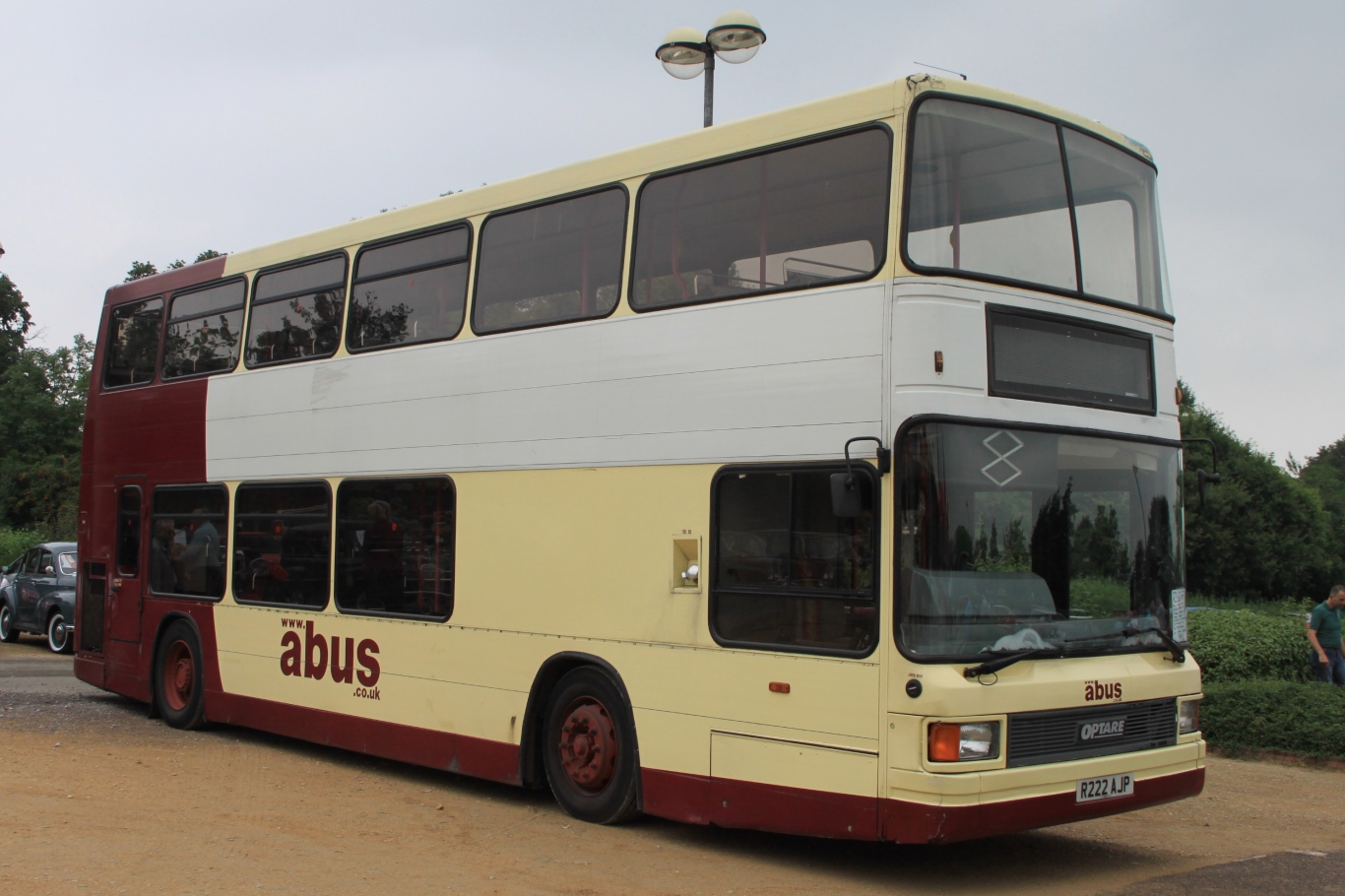
Abus Optare Spectra bodied DB250LF, the first low floor double-decker bus to enter service in the United Kingdom

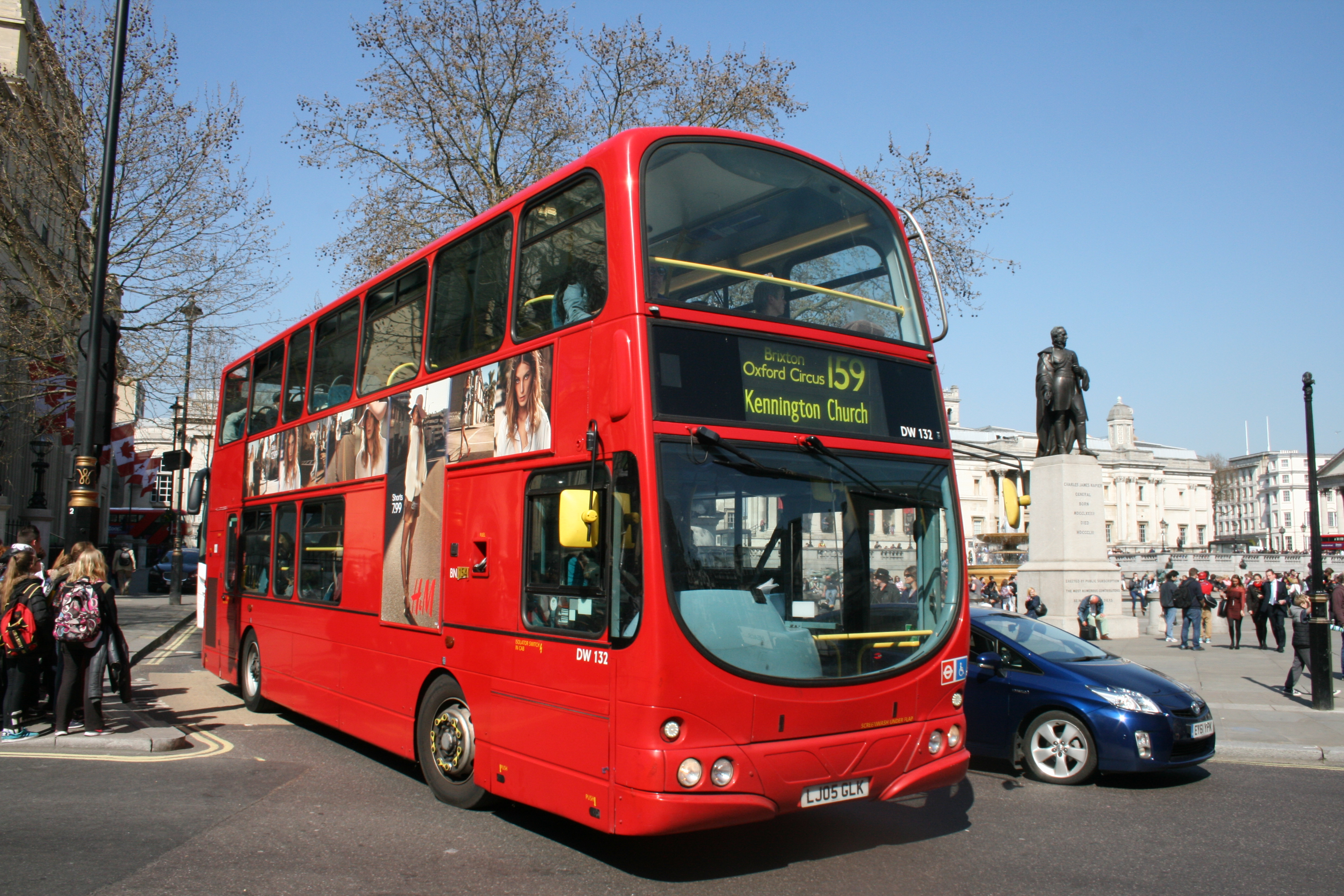
Arriva London Wright Pulsar Gemini bodied DB250LF at Trafalgar Square in April 2015

The DB250LF, the low-floor version of the DB250, was the first low-floor double-decker bus chassis available in the United Kingdom. The DB250LF is readily identified by the centrally-exiting exhaust at the rear, which can cause problems with extreme changes of slope. A revised version of DB250LF was launched in 2004 as the DB250+. The design has received a number of modifications, one of which is the use of independent front suspension.

The first DB250LFs received Optare Spectra body, which was sold exclusively on the DB250. The first low-floor variant entered service on 4 February 1998 with Abus of Bristol, narrowly beating a Travel West Midlands DB250LF to operate the first low floor double-decker bus service in the UK. Travel West Midlands would later go on to order 20 more Spectras in 1999. Additional operators of the DB250LF with Optare Spectra bodywork included Reading Buses, who purchased 26, and Wilts & Dorset, who purchased 78.

Later DB250 chassis were fitted with Alexander ALX400, Plaxton President, East Lancs Myllennium Lowlander and Wright Pulsar Gemini bodies. The development of a Wright alternative arose because Arriva wished to buy both the Wright body and DB250 chassis. Unable to do so, it instead purchased over 100 Wright Eclipse Gemini bodied Volvo B7TLs. Wright subsequently developed the Pulsar Gemini in 2003 in order to win more orders from Arriva.

Arriva London purchased and acquired 632 DB250s between 1998 and 2005 with Alexander ALX400 (389), Plaxton President (110) and Wright Pulsar Gemini (133) bodywork. Arriva Midlands and Arriva Yorkshire also purchased examples.

The DB250LF chassis was also adopted by Wrightbus for the development of its hybrid-powered double-decker bus, the Wright Pulsar Gemini HEV.

Production of the DB250 (including the LF) ended in 2007, although examples continued entering service until 2008. Its successor, the Wright Gemini 2 integral double decker with VDL chassis modules, was launched in November 2008.
