= Optare Spectra =

Double-decker bus bodywork on DAF DB250 chassis

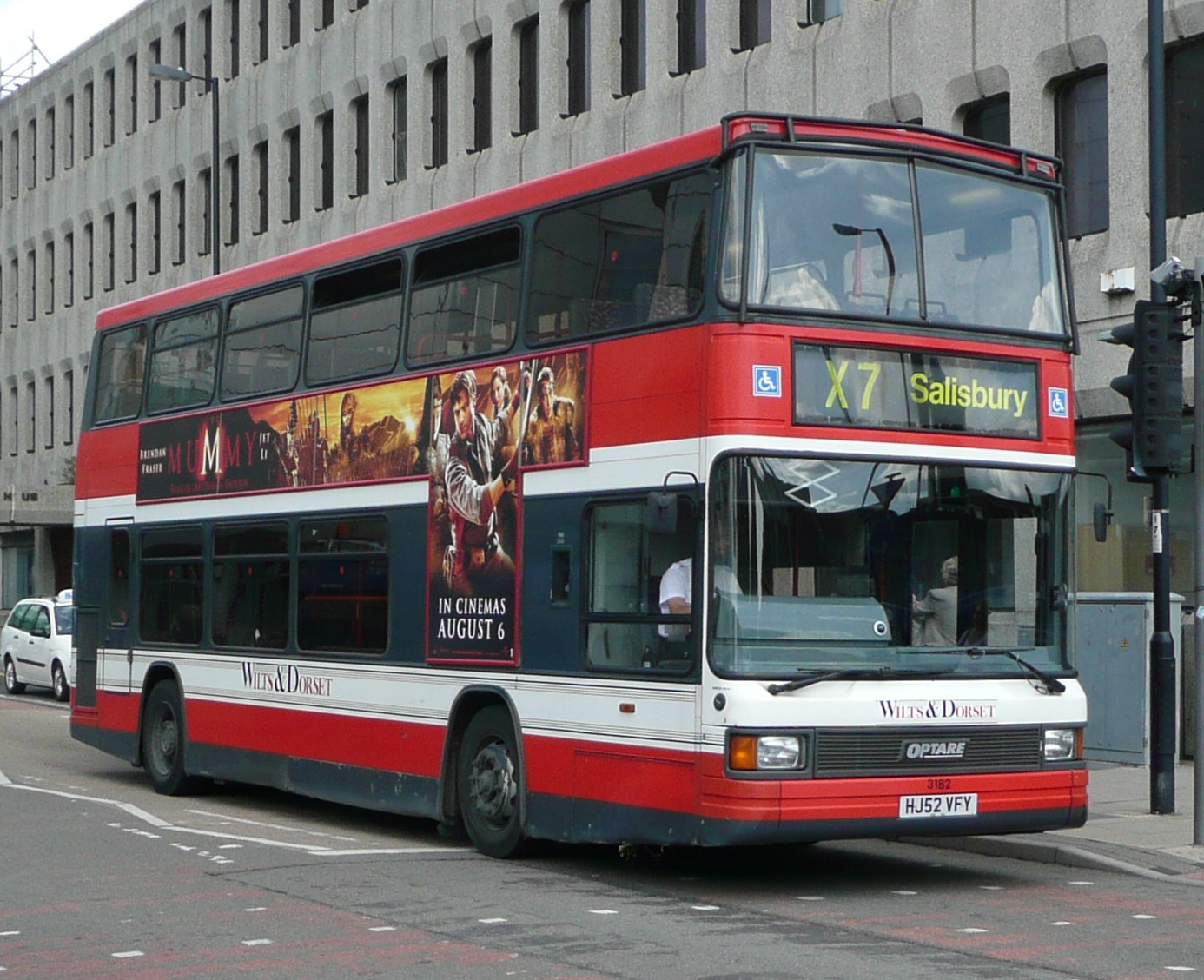
- Wilts & Dorset Optare Spectra bodied DAF DB250LF in Southampton in August 2008

Overview
- Manufacturer: Optare
- Production: 1991–2006
- Assembly: Cross Gates, Leeds, England

Body and chassis
- Doors: 1 or 2
- Floor type: Step entrance/Low floor
- Chassis: DAF DB250/DB250LF
- Related: Optare Vecta

Powertrain
- Engine: DAF HS 200
- Capacity: 85 (71 seated)
- Power output: 272 brake horsepower (203 kW)
- Transmission: Voith D854.2/D854.3 three or four speed automatic ZF Ecomat 4HP500 four-speed automatic ZF Ecomat 5HP500 five-speed automatic

Dimensions
- Length: 10.5–11 metres (34–36 ft)
- Width: 2.5 metres (8 ft 2 in)
- Height: 4.17–4.32 metres (13.7–14.2 ft)
- Curb weight: 11,360 kilograms (25,040 lb)

The Optare Spectra was a double-decker bus body built on both the step entrance DAF DB250 and low-floor DB250LF chassis between 1991 and 2006.

== Design ==
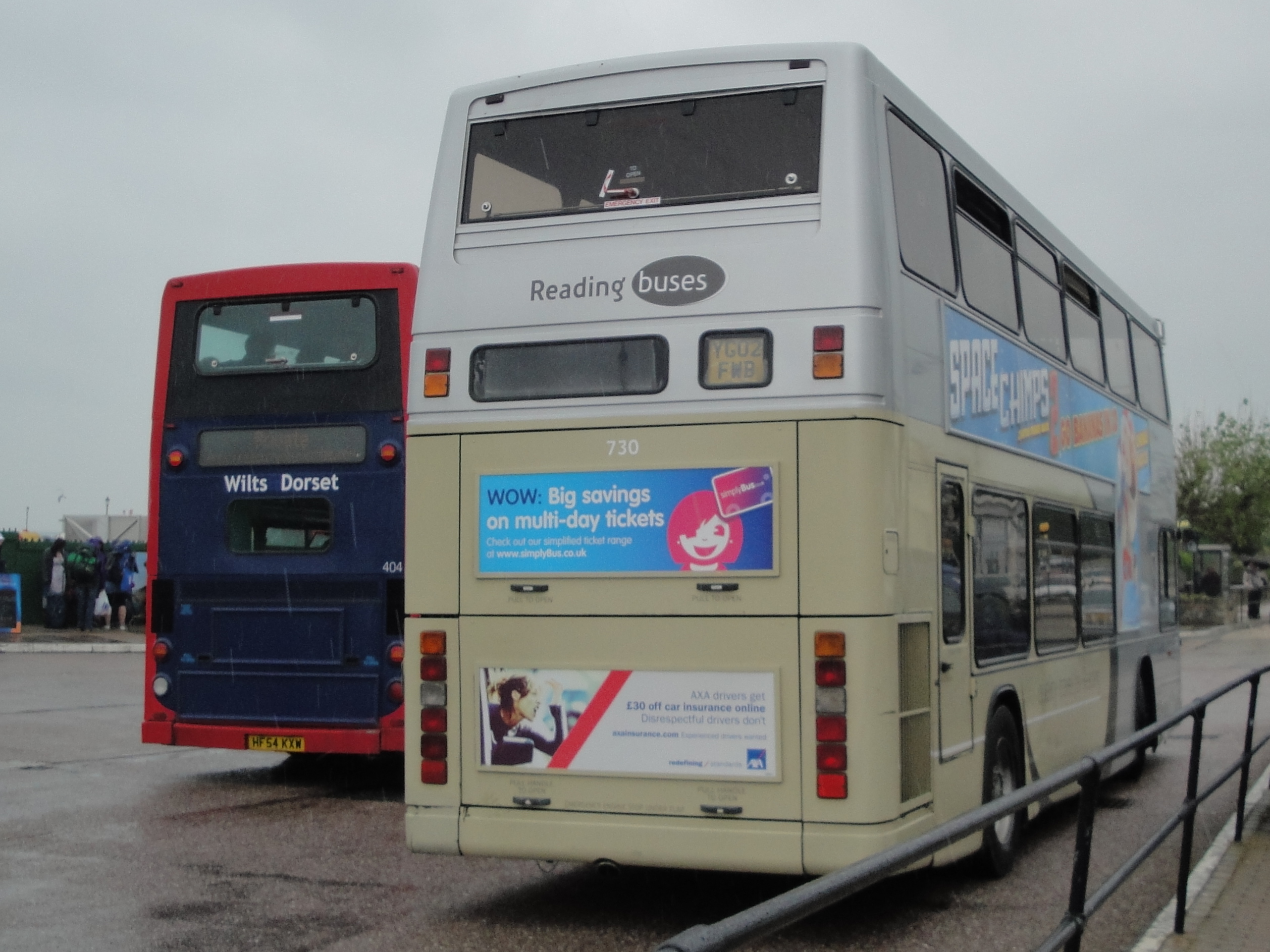
Reading Buses Optare Spectra bodied DAF DB250 rear in Ryde in June 2012

Launched at the Coach & Bus '91 expo at the National Exhibition Centre in Birmingham, the Optare Spectra, developed as a joint United Bus project between Optare and DAF, was based on the designs of the successful MCW Metrobus, the design rights of which had been jointly purchased by United Bus in 1989 following the collapse of Metro Cammell Weymann.

The Spectra body was constructed on DAF's DB250 chassis, capable of kneeling 100 millimetres (3.9 in) down to the kerbside for access to a single entrance step, on an Alusuisse aluminium frame. The design, which features a front fascia adapted from Optare's Vecta midibus, is notable for the exclusion of a lower deck rear window, replaced by a lift-up flap above the engine bay covering the Spectra's air filter and coolant expansion tank. The step-entrance Spectra in single-door format typically seated a total of 71 passengers, as well as being included with a pushchair rack, and was equipped with a closed-circuit television (CCTV) system that could be monitored from the driver's cab. Additional options included soft trim, elements, tinted side windows, internal heating and air conditioning.

In 1995, the low-floor DAF DB250LF chassis was launched. Two years later, Optare launched an updated low-floor version of the Spectra built on the chassis, the United Kingdom's first low-floor double-decker bus. Though sharing many features with the step-entrance model, the new Spectra featured a longer wheelbase, allowing for an extra 17 seats in single-door configuration, and the body's height was lowered to 4.17 metres (13.7 ft), making the bus suitable for services requiring lowbridge double-deck buses. As a result, larger gasket windows came as standard.

== Operators ==
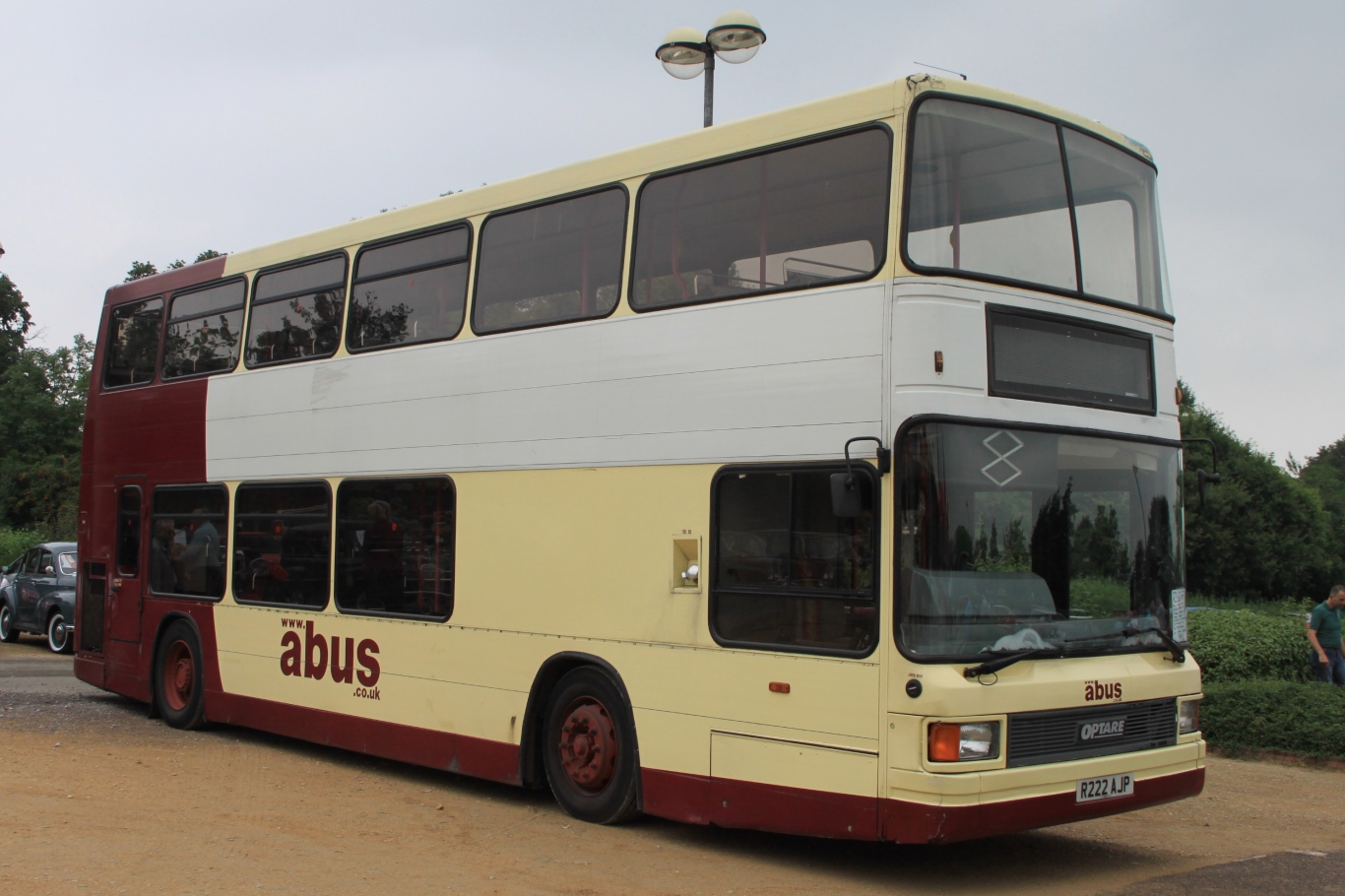
Abus Optare Spectra R222 AJP, the United Kingdom's first low floor double-decker bus to enter service

Reading Buses took delivery the first production model of the Spectra, going on to purchase an additional 25 more until 2001. London Buses followed by taking delivery of 25 Spectras between 1992 and early 1993 as replacements for AEC Routemasters, with all but one delivered to the London Central subsidiary for use on London Buses route 3; Metroline took delivery of a single Spectra from this order built to dual-door specification for evaluation on route 16. East Yorkshire Motor Services, meanwhile, took delivery of a single Spectra in September 1992 that was similarly used to evaluate the type for inclusion in the company's fleet replacement programme.

The first two low-floor Optare Spectras on DAF DB250LF chassis were handed over to the National Express Group in October 1997, being allocated to Travel West Midlands and Travel Dundee respectively. These were followed by 20 more Spectras being delivered to Travel West Midlands to upgrade West Midlands bus route 50.

Wilts & Dorset were the largest operator of Optare Spectras in both step-entrance and low-floor format, ordering 78 from the early 1990s to 2002. Arriva Yorkshire, the second-largest operator of the type purchased a total of 42 low-floor Spectras, purchasing 18 in 1999 and another 24 in 2002.

31 left-hand drive dual door Spectras were produced for operators in Turkey, with 26 being produced for IETT in Istanbul and five being produced for İzulaş in İzmir. İzmir's Spectras were finished in London Buses red and tapegrey livery as the city's mayor was impressed by the liveries of London Central's Spectras.

Other operators of the Optare Spectra include Eastbourne Buses, who took on 12 Spectras in 1997, Capital Logistics, who received a delayed order of six dual-door Spectras in 1999 for use on London Buses route 60, and Isle of Man Transport, who had three low-floor Spectras delivered in 2000. Abus of Bristol's first low-floor Optare Spectra entered service on 4 February 1998, becoming the first low-floor, fully accessible double-decker bus to enter service in the United Kingdom hours ahead of the Travel West Midlands Spectra.

Production of the Optare Spectra ceased when the final two rolled off the line in late 2006, with the last Optare Spectra being built for Anglian Bus.

== See also ==
- List of buses
