= Tillingbourne Bus Company =

Former Surrey bus operator

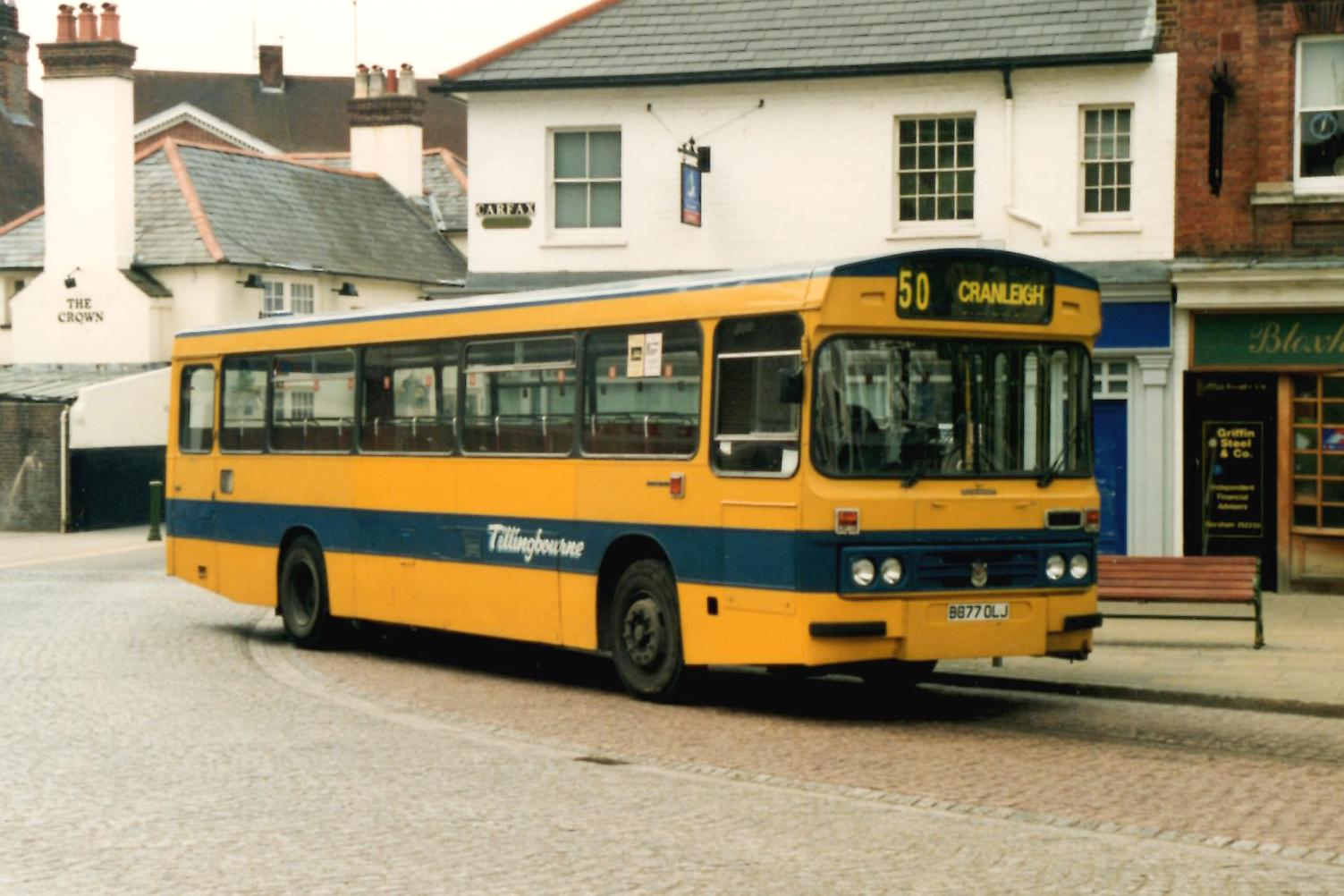
- Duple bodied Leyland Tiger in Horsham in April 1996
- Parent: Trevor Brown
- Founded: 1924; 102 years ago
- Ceased operation: 2001; 25 years ago
- Headquarters: Cranleigh
- Service area: Surrey; West Sussex; Hampshire; Berkshire
- Service type: Bus operator
- Fleet: 70 (at closure)

Tillingbourne Bus Company was a bus company based in Cranleigh, Surrey. The company operated bus and coach services in Surrey, West Sussex, Hampshire and Berkshire from 1924 until 2001.

It was founded as Tillingbourne Valley in 1924, and became a limited company in 1931, taking the name Tillingbourne Valley Services. It initially operated routes in the Guildford area from a garage in Chilworth using small single-deck buses painted in a maroon livery. Coach hire and excursions began in 1931, but two years later these activities split into a separate company, Tillingbourne Valley Coaches, which operated independently for a further 24 years. Until 1970 Tillingbourne was owned and managed by three generations of the Trice family, before being sold to Trevor Brown.

The company changed its name to Tillingbourne Bus Company in 1972, changing its livery to blue and yellow, and moved to a garage in Gomshall in the same year. A second garage in Ewhurst was opened in 1974. An expansion of operations in the late 1970s and early 1980s, much of it through the award of county council contracted routes, took the company's vehicles into West Sussex and Hampshire as well as Surrey. Tillingbourne took over the services of London operator Orpington & District following that company's collapse in 1981. These were run separately from the main company as Tillingbourne (Metropolitan) which, in 1983, was sold to its management to form Metrobus, now part of the Go-Ahead Group. The company moved garages again in 1980, settling in Cranleigh. A new, larger garage in the same town was opened in February 2001. Deregulation of local bus services in 1986 led to further expansion, including the establishment in 1989 of a new brand, Hobbit, for Tillingbourne's minibus operations. A high-quality coaching subsidiary, Dorking Coaches, was also operated towards the end of Tillingbourne's life.

Tillingbourne began operations with a single vehicle, expanding to operate around 70 buses by 2001. A range of types were operated, including early Thornycroft and Dennis vehicles, and later Guy and Bedford products. The company's fleet was updated in the 1990s with new Volvo and Optare vehicles. Following Tillingbourne's closure, its fleet was disposed of, with vehicles sold to Shamrock Coaches, Norfolk Green, Black Prince Buses, Safeguard Coaches, Arriva Guildford & West Surrey and Islwyn Borough Transport.

The company was placed in administration in March 2001, following two years of heavy losses, and closed down permanently a month later. This led to a series of service changes, which saw its operations covered by a range of different operators. Other effects causing Tillingbourne's collapse included a fall in the total number of passengers using buses in Hampshire and local criticism following an increase in the number of vehicles using the, later closed, Arriva West Sussex garage in Warnham. The sites of both Tillingbourne garages in Cranleigh were converted for use by other industries.

== History ==
=== Creation and early history (1924-1972) ===
Tillingbourne was formed in 1924 by Vic Smith and George Trice. It was initially known as Tillingbourne Valley, and operated a single vehicle in a maroon livery from a garage in Chilworth on a service between Guildford and Gomshall. Smith left the company in the late 1920s, and a new route from Guildford to Albury Park was introduced around the same time, with four vehicles owned by 1928. The route to Gomshall was extended to Peaslake, and briefly faced competition from Surrey Hills Motor Services prior to their takeover by Aldershot & District, who withdrew the competing route. The company's garage was rebuilt after being destroyed in a fire along with three of its vehicles in 1928. Tillingbourne was reconstituted as a limited company, Tillingbourne Valley Services Limited, in October 1931.

Following George Trice's death in 1933, control of the business passed to his son, also called George. A coach hire and excursion business had been introduced in July 1931; this was split out into a new company, Tillingbourne Valley Coaches, which operated independently until 1955. From the early 1930s, until 1964, the service to Peaslake was run jointly with the London Passenger Transport Board; operation of the entire route was taken over in August 1964, but falling passenger numbers meant that the route was cut back in frequency a year later. A new livery of maroon and grey was introduced in 1964.

George Trice retired in 1948 and was succeeded by his son Derek, who sold Tillingbourne to Trevor Brown in September 1970. In the same year, route numbering was introduced for the first time to the three routes then operated. The company made an operating loss in 1969 and 1970, so one route, a local service in Guildford, was withdrawn in October 1971 due to poor usage, and another was cut in frequency. As the Chilworth garage was still owned by Trice, operations were transferred to an open-air site in Gomshall in early 1972.

=== Change of name and expansion (1972-1986) ===
The company's name was changed to Tillingbourne Bus Company in May 1972, following the introduction of a service between Horsham and Colgate, with a new livery of blue, yellow and grey introduced. A new Managing Director, Barry King, joined Tillingbourne from North Downs Coaches in the same year. In 1974, a small garage in Ewhurst was acquired and maintenance work transferred there, although the majority of the fleet continued to be based in Gomshall.

In May 1976, the company's long-established route between Guildford and Peaslake was extended to Cranleigh via Ewhurst, and a once-daily schoolday service to and from The Haven, the first bus route to serve the community, was introduced. A number of service changes saw Tillingbourne vehicles operating to Croydon and Chichester one day a week each by 1977, although both were withdrawn after three years. The service to Colgate was withdrawn and replaced by a local half-hourly route in Horsham in 1979. In September 1980, the company moved depots again to a larger site in Cranleigh.

The collapse of Orpington & District in early 1981 prompted the company to launch a new operation in Greater London. This was split from the main operation as Tillingbourne (Metropolitan) in July 1981, but sold to its managerial team in 1983. It adopted the name Metrobus and continues to operate.

In June 1981, new once-weekly routes linking Horsham to Steyning and Cranleigh/Ewhurst to Brighton were introduced, the second to replace a withdrawn Southdown Motor Services service. To improve profits on the Brighton route, beer was carried from the Sussex Brewery near Edburton to public houses along the route alongside passengers. The scheduled service operations of coach firm McCann's were acquired, together with three vehicles, on 1 November 1982, although some were withdrawn a year later.

Further expansion came in April 1985, following over a year of consultation with county council members, regulators, when two new routes were introduced. One operated in competition with Alder Valley, while the other took the place of services withdrawn by other operators. Following these changes Tillingbourne became the only operator to serve Chilworth, Albury and Shere. Two new vehicles were purchased for the routes. At the same time, all of Tillingbourne's services were renumbered into a new two-digit sequence, to avoid confusion with London Country routes. A year later, the second of the new services, circular route 23/25, was reduced in frequency from hourly to two-hourly, although much of the route was covered by extending another route. Another new service, linking Cranleigh and Godalming, was also introduced. In August 1986, operation of a number of council-contracted services, including a route from Redhill to Reigate and a local route in Horsham, were taken over from other companies.

=== Post-deregulation (1986-2001) ===
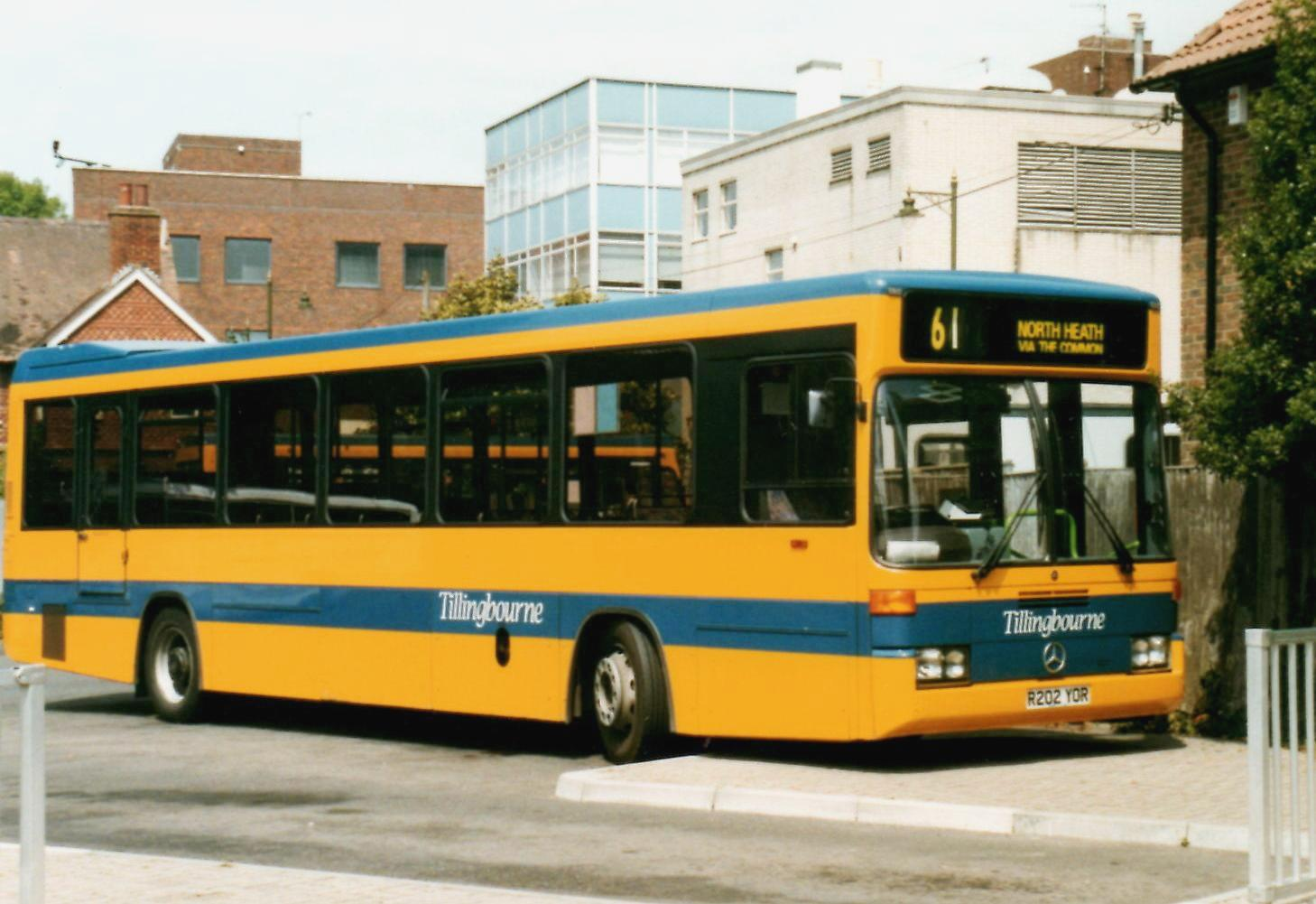
Optare Prisma bodied Mercedes-Benz O405 in Horsham in May 1999

Following deregulation in October 1986, a small number of service changes were made, with a new route from Guildford to Chiddingfold being introduced and a service to Gomshall withdrawn. At the same time, a new brand name, Hobbit, was introduced for Tillingbourne's minibus operations. Barry King left the company in December 1986 and was replaced as Managing Director by Chris Bowler.

In early 1989, operations in Horsham were reduced, following the loss of the tendered route to Barns Green. A new service to Billingshurst was briefly introduced in February 1989, but withdrawn after two months. In July, a new service between Guildford and the British Aerospace site at Dunsfold Aerodrome was introduced. Further expansion eastwards came in November 1989, when the operation of eleven tendered routes, requiring six buses, was won from the county council. These were operated under the Hobbit name. A new service linking Normandy and Christmaspie to Guildford two days a week was introduced in October 1989. A second route to the two villages was added in 1995. In January 1999 a new route from Farnham to Tongham via Normandy was launched, as was a direct service from the village to Guildford. In 1998 an outstation was opened in Aldershot following the award of contracted work in Reading to Tillingbourne.

Tillingbourne introduced a new tourist route in the summer of 1995. Operating on Sundays for six months of the year, it provided a circular service linking Guildford, Godalming and Cranleigh with a number of nearby rural locations not served by other routes. Although similar services were operated by London & Country and Nostalgiabus, the new service was designed to avoid any direct competition. The route was operated with a Bristol SU single-decker acquired from a bus preservationist.

In September 2000, Tillingbourne controversially reduced the number of journeys on contracted route 516, which linked Dorking, Leatherhead and Epsom. Although this was within the terms of the contract, it was criticised by residents of intermediate villages, who claimed the communities relied in particular on a cancelled morning journey. Operations were moved to a new larger site, still located in Cranleigh, in February 2001. The company believed this would reduce operating costs and allow for future expansion.

== Closure ==
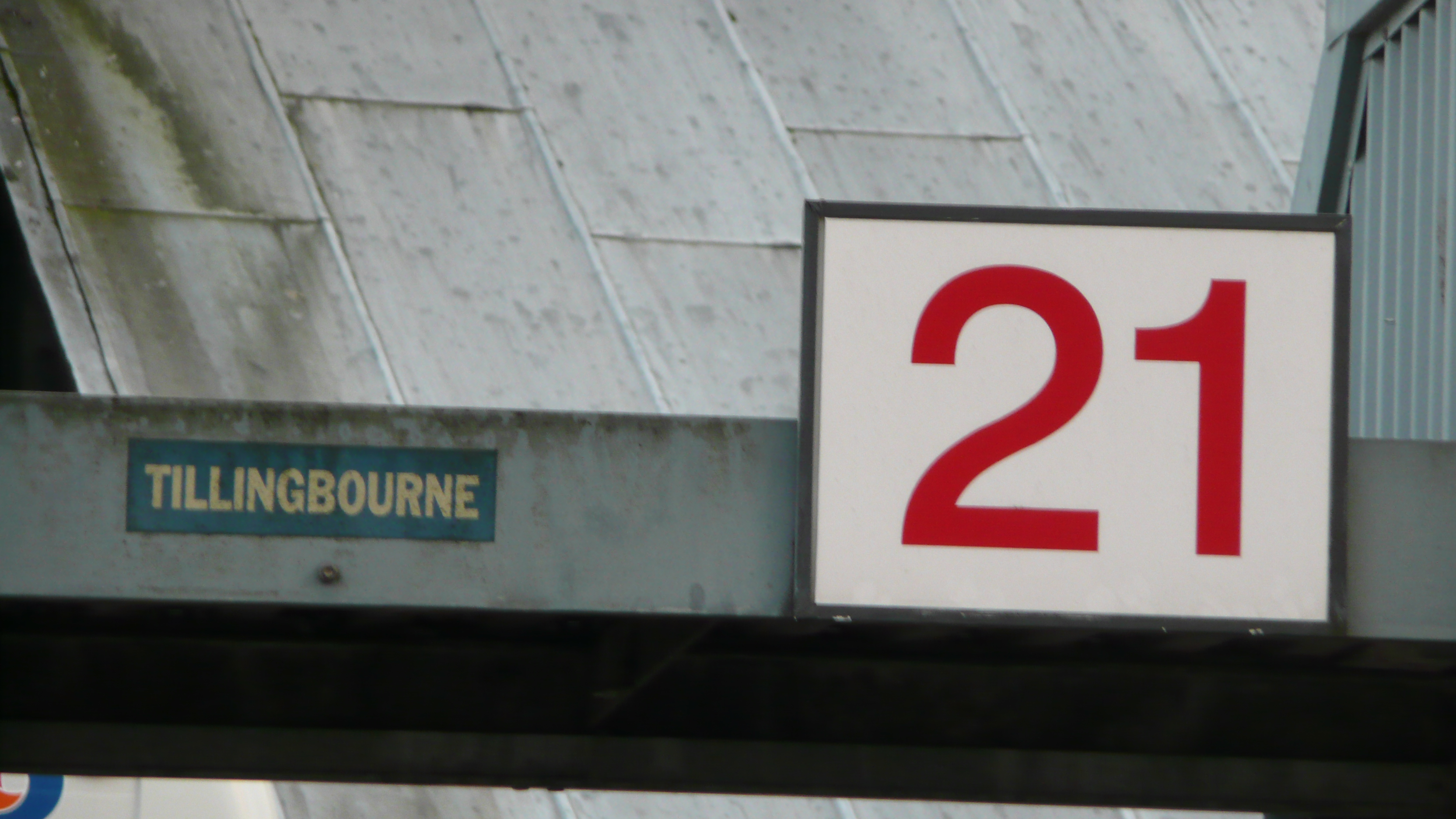
Tillingbourne's name on the side of Guildford bus station in October 2008

On 19 March 2001, Tillingbourne abruptly ceased operations and was placed in the hands of receivers Begbies Traynor. This followed two years in which the company had lost around £450,000. The receivers blamed the losses on increasing costs, low subsidies from local councils and falling passenger numbers. The closure left 140 staff unemployed and caused large numbers of passengers to be stranded. Replacement services were organised by Surrey County Council and four bus operators, with the majority of routes being covered within days by temporary contracted services. Some schoolchildren were forced to find other means of transport, although workings on routes 62 and 63 were covered by Aventa Transport.

It was initially thought that Tillingbourne would be sold to another operator, with four companies reported to be interested. However, by early April 2001, it became clear that this would not take place, as the offers submitted were lower than the value of the vehicles owned by the company.

Begbies Traynor was criticised by Council members for refusing to keep the company operational while replacement services were being arranged. Mole Valley councillor Hazel Watson stated that the withdrawal of services at short notice was "totally unacceptable", while Shere county councillor David Davis described the closure as a "local tragedy". Council leaders also denied the claim that the subsidies had been too low.

== Related operations ==
Tillingbourne Valley Coaches

In 1933, the bus and coach operations of what was then Tillingbourne Valley Services were split. The coaching unit was taken over by Lionel Rhees, previously an employee of Tillingbourne, and operated from a depot in Chilworth under the name Tillingbourne Valley Coaches. This company bought three second-hand coaches to run on excursions and private hire operations. After 14 years of operation it launched a bus service between Guildford and Blackheath. Rhees died in 1953 and Tillingbourne Valley Coaches passed to his wife, who sold out to established operator Rackliffe of Guildford a year later. Rackliffe was itself taken over by Cookes Coaches in 1955, and the Blackheath service withdrawn.

Tillingbourne (Metropolitan) Limited

In February 1981, the long-standing operator Orpington & District collapsed due to financial difficulties, so Tillingbourne decided to launch a test operation of three former O&D services. These proved successful, so more services were added and two new AEC Reliance coaches purchased for the operation. In July 1981, the Orpington operation was given a separate licence, under the name Tillingbourne (Metropolitan) Limited, with six vehicles allocated to it. By 1983, however, it became clear that the local area management of Tillingbourne (Metropolitan) wanted to develop the business in a different way from that of the main company. On 24 September 1983, the Orpington operation's directors, Gary Wood and Peter Larking, bought out the subsidiary to form Metrobus Limited.

Dorking Coaches

Following the takeover of Dorking Coaches in the late 1990s, a coaching division was set up using the same name, under the management of former Traffic Manager John Gaff. It operated high-quality coaches, including three air-conditioned vehicles which joined the fleet in 2000, on coach hire and tour work.

== Fleet ==
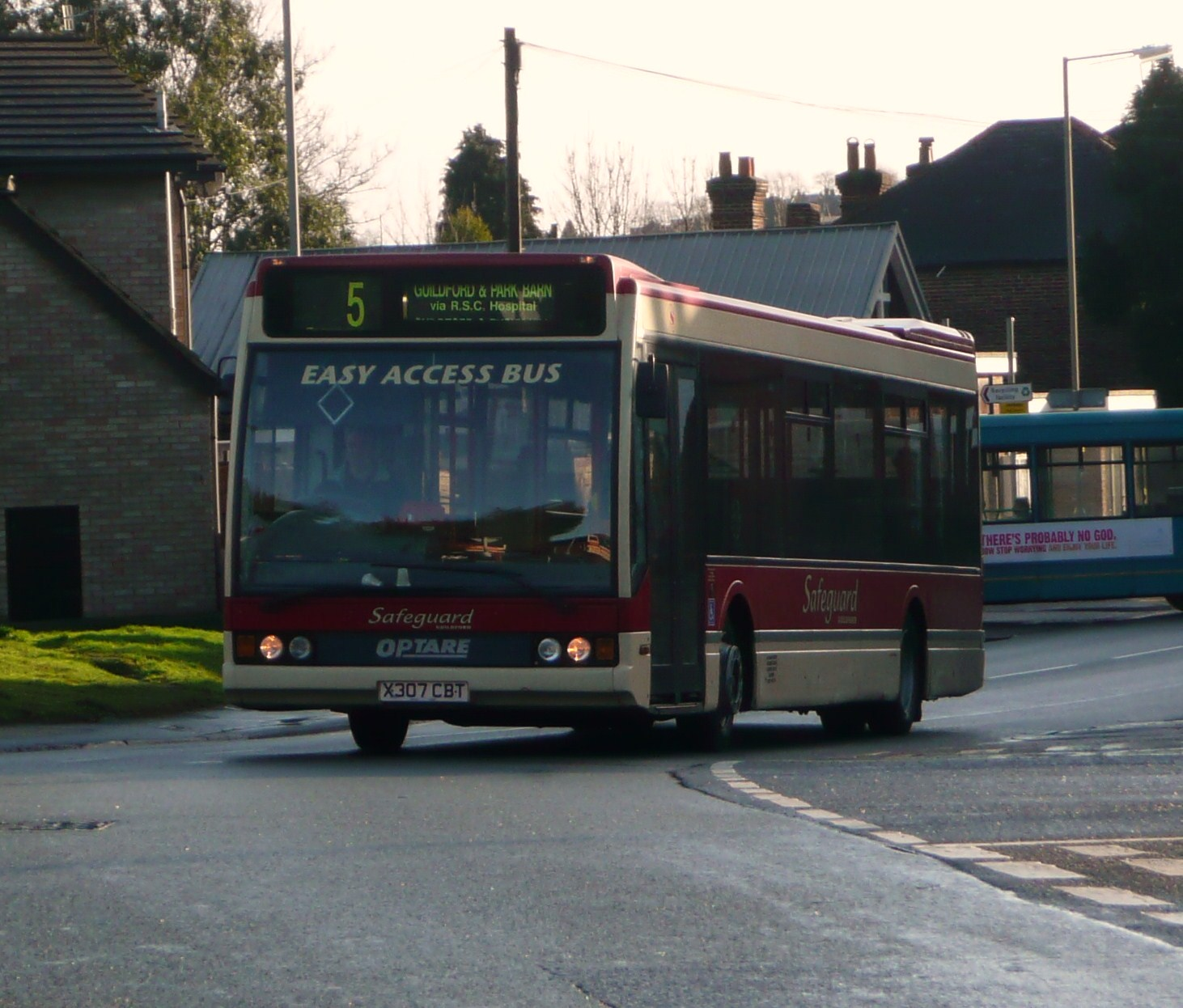
One of a pair of Optare Excels new to Tillingbourne operating with Safeguard Coaches following Tillingbourne's collapse

The first vehicle to be bought by Tillingbourne was a single-deck Chevrolet with 14 seats, which entered service on the launch of the company's first route in 1924. It was joined by a similar Overland Automobile bus later in the year. Two further vehicles had been purchased by 1928, when a depot fire destroyed three of the four buses. They were replaced by second-hand buses including an 18-seat Dennis and several Thornycroft A2 vehicles. From November 1934 until the outbreak of World War II, these were progressively replaced by new buses, also built by Thornycroft. The first double-deck vehicle to be bought was a Bristol K Type, which joined the fleet in 1959. Eight Guy Vixens were bought from London Transport between 1963 and 1964 to replace the entire previous fleet. These were succeeded by a wide variety of types, with Bedford coaches and buses the most numerous. In the 1970s, a number of second-hand Bristol SUL4A's, with ECW B36F bodies, were operated.

In the period shortly before and after deregulation, a range of types were used. As well as a large number of Bedford vehicles, which continued to be bought new until the late 1980s, the fleet also included the AEC Reliance, Leyland Leopard, Leyland Tiger and Volvo B10M models, and the first two Dennis Lancet single-deckers to be built. The company bought its first minibus, a 16-seat Ford Transit, in 1985. The Tillingbourne fleet in the late 1980s and early 1990s also included two rare Dennis Dorchesters bought new, and a Volvo B10M coach with the last Plaxton Derwent body built.

The fleet was substantially updated shortly prior to the company's closure. Two Volvo B6 single-deckers were bought in 1994. These were followed by a number of Optare products including the Metrorider minibus and four of the last Optare Vecta single-deckers built. The most common type in the fleet in the late 1990s was the Mercedes-Benz 811D minibus; by 1998 21 were in use out of a total fleet of 65. Tillingbourne bought its first low-floor buses, two new Optare Excels, in 2000.

== Legacy and subsequent history ==
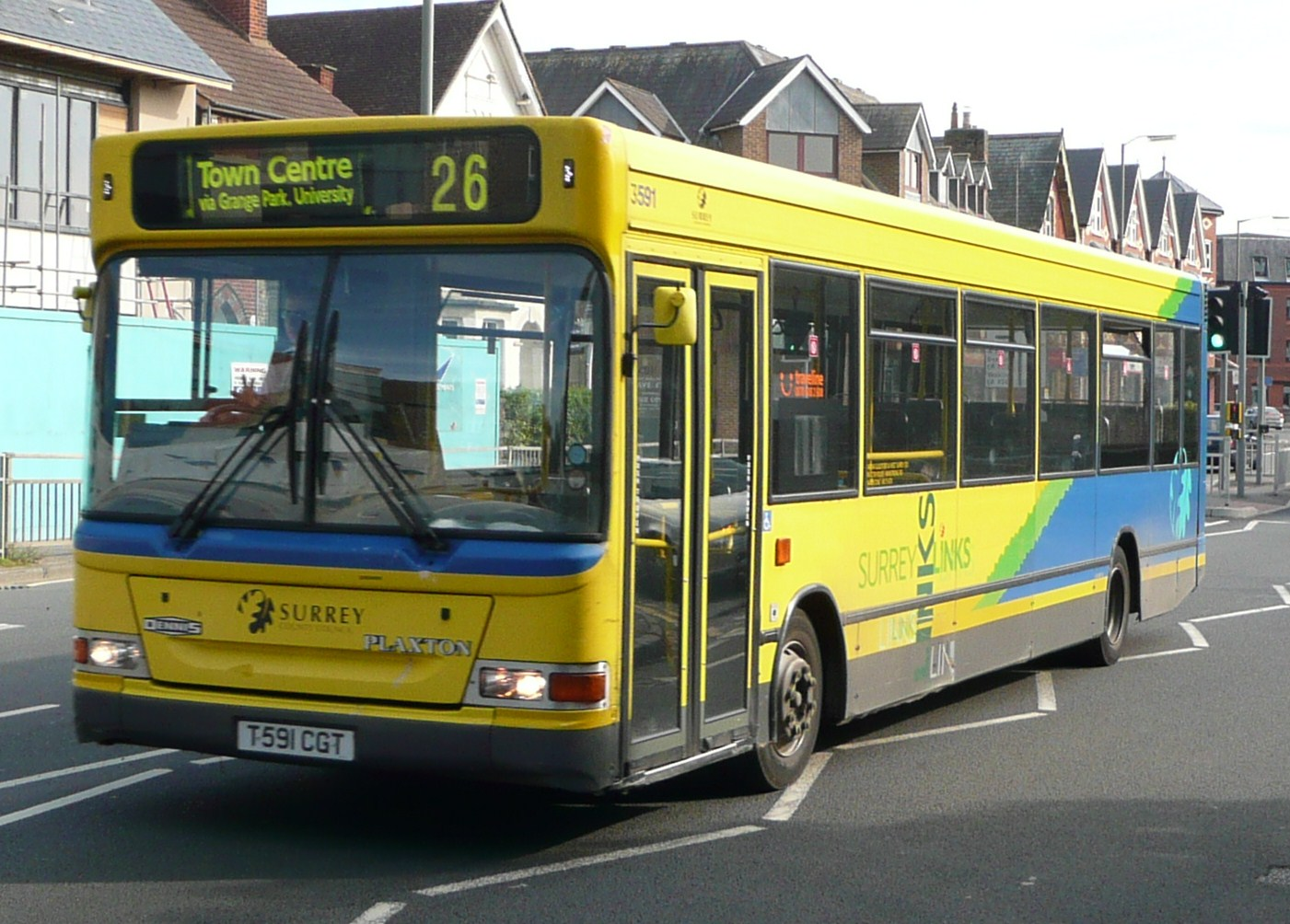
One of the two Dennis Darts owned by Surrey County Council that were leased to Tillingbourne in service with Arriva Guildford & West Surrey

Tillingbourne's routes were taken over by a variety of local operators. Arriva Guildford & West Surrey took over the majority of the operations in Guildford and Cranleigh, while the Arriva West Sussex division took over services in Horsham. Operations in and around Woking were taken on by Tellings-Golden Miller and Reptons Coaches. White Rose took over the route between Staines and Camberley, while Thames Travel took over the routes into Reading. Fleet Buzz took over operations from Tillingbourne in their north-east Hampshire territory, they would later renumber the routes into 70-series.

Following the end of Tillingbourne's operations, many of its newer vehicles were sold for further use. Buyers included Black Prince Buses, which took three Optare Prismas, and Islwyn Borough Transport, which bought Tillingbourne's Optare Vectas. One of the surviving Leyland Tigers was bought by Norfolk Green. The biggest customer was Shamrock Coaches of Pontypridd which took 27 vehicles, including the Mercedes minibuses and nine Optare Metroriders. Some vehicles remained in Surrey, including two Dennis Dart SLFs leased from Surrey County Council which were passed on to Arriva Guildford & West Surrey, and two Optare Excels bought by Safeguard Coaches of Guildford.

A fall in bus passenger numbers, between 1999 and 2001 in the areas of Hampshire served by Tillingbourne, was in part explained as being a result of the loss of services caused by the company's closure.

The increased vehicle requirements at Arriva's Warnham (Horsham) garage, which took over three of Tillingbourne's former routes, led to criticism from residents in the area and the suggestion that the site should be closed and operations moved to another location. The depot, buses and operation were sold by Arriva to Metrobus in September 2009, who moved all operations to their garage in Crawley and closed the site.

Both of Tillingbourne's former garage sites in Cranleigh have been converted for other uses. Permission was granted in February 2002 for the smaller site abandoned shortly before the company closed down to be taken over by a plant and vehicle hire firm. The larger site used in the final few months of operation was converted for use by a mail order firm, with permission for the change granted by the local council in November 2002.
