= Abus (bus operator) =

Bus operator in the West of England

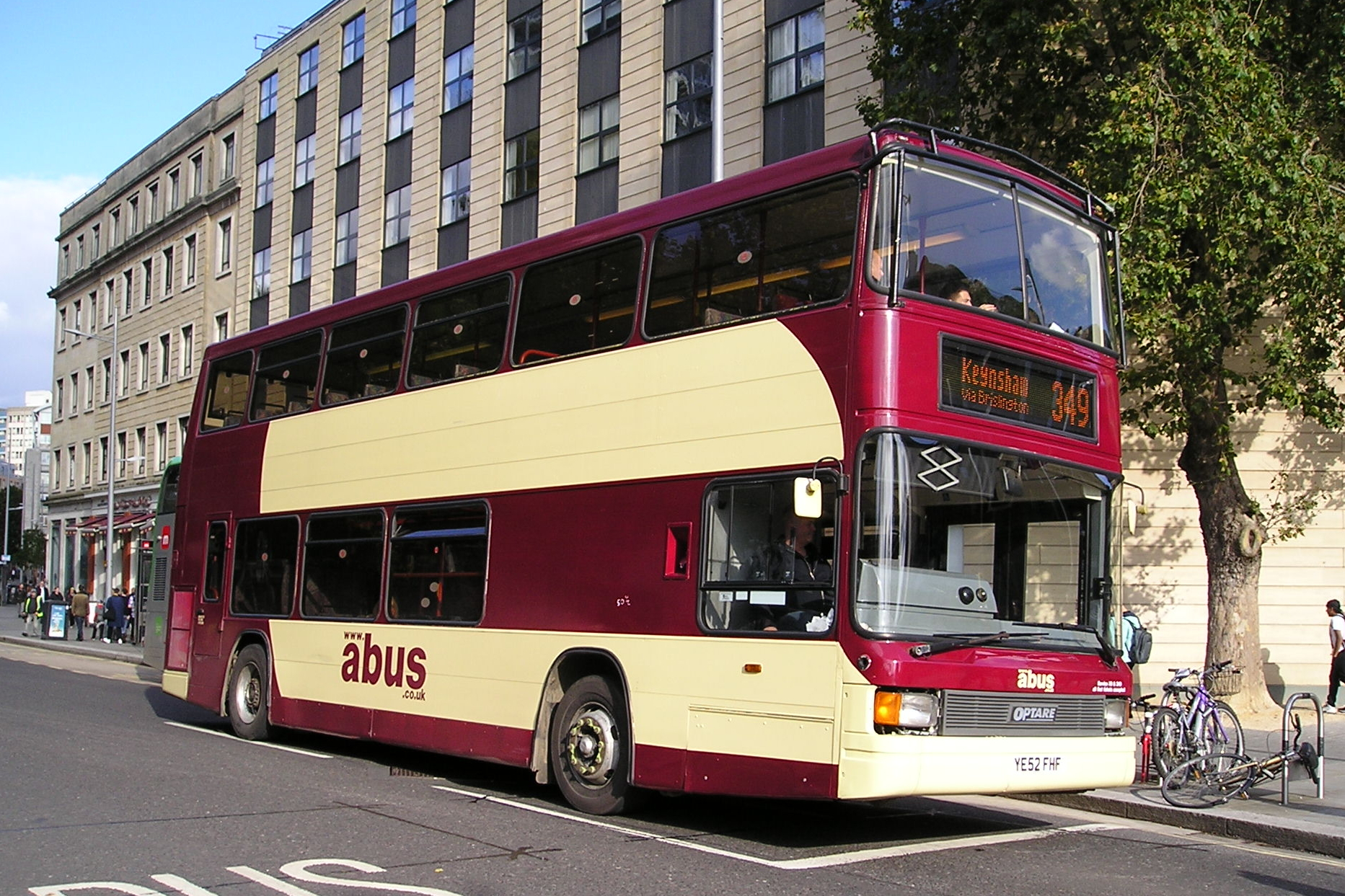
- Abus Optare Spectra bodied DAF DB250 in Bristol in October 2019
- Parent: Alan Peters
- Founded: May 1991
- Headquarters: St Philip's Marsh, Bristol
- Service area: Somerset
- Service type: Bus operator
- Routes: 11 (including 6 shopper buses, 2 school buses)
- Depots: 1
- Fleet: 5 (September 2023)
- Website: www.abus.co.uk

Abus is an English bus company based in Bristol that operates school bus services in Bath and Sainsbury's shopper buses around South Bristol.

== History ==
Abus was founded in May 1991 by former Badgerline manager Alan Peters with an Eastern Coach Works bodied Daimler Fleetline on route A49 from Bristol to Keynsham competing with Badgerline's 349. In February 1992, it began operating its first service under contract to Avon County Council. From 1997, it began operating route 349 in co-operation with Badgerline.

In 1998, Abus operated the first low floor double deck bus in the world, an Optare Spectra bodied DAF DB250. In 1999, it began operating co-ordinated services from Castle Cary railway station to the Glastonbury Festival. By 2016, it was operating route X9 from Bristol to Nailsea under contract to First West of England.

In June 2016, Abus operated 24 buses.

In November 2018, ten buses were destroyed in a fire at Abus' St Philip's Marsh depot. With the pending introduction of a low-emission zone in Bristol that would require much of the fleet to be replaced, Peters decided to semi-retire with operations on service 349 ceasing on 28 August 2021. Since ceasing operations on service 349, the company gained 6 shopper routes to and from Winterstoke Road Sainsbury's in South Bristol, and also operates school buses R2 & R3 to Ralph Allen School in Bath.

After First West of England started withdrawing routes owing to a driver shortage and commercial nonviability, it came to some of the smaller operators such as Abus to take some routes on. On 27 September 2022 Abus officially started running route 22 between the University of Bath and Twerton. Following this, on 10 October 2022, Abus started running route 96 in South Bristol between Hengrove and Brislington. As well as this they operated route 178 between Brislington P&R and Paulton jointly with Citistar with Abus providing one journey in each direction daily. Both the 96 and 178 were withdrawn on 2 April 2023.

== Fleet ==
As of September 2023, Abus operate five buses:

- DAF DB250 Optare Spectra - AP04 BUS
- Scania N94UD OmniDekka - 704 BYL
- Scania N94UD OmniDekka - YN54 AEY
- Scania N94UD OmniDekka - YN54 AEZ
- Volvo B7TL East Lancs Myllennium Vyking - PA04 CYF
