= Wright Pulsar Gemini =

Double decker bus body

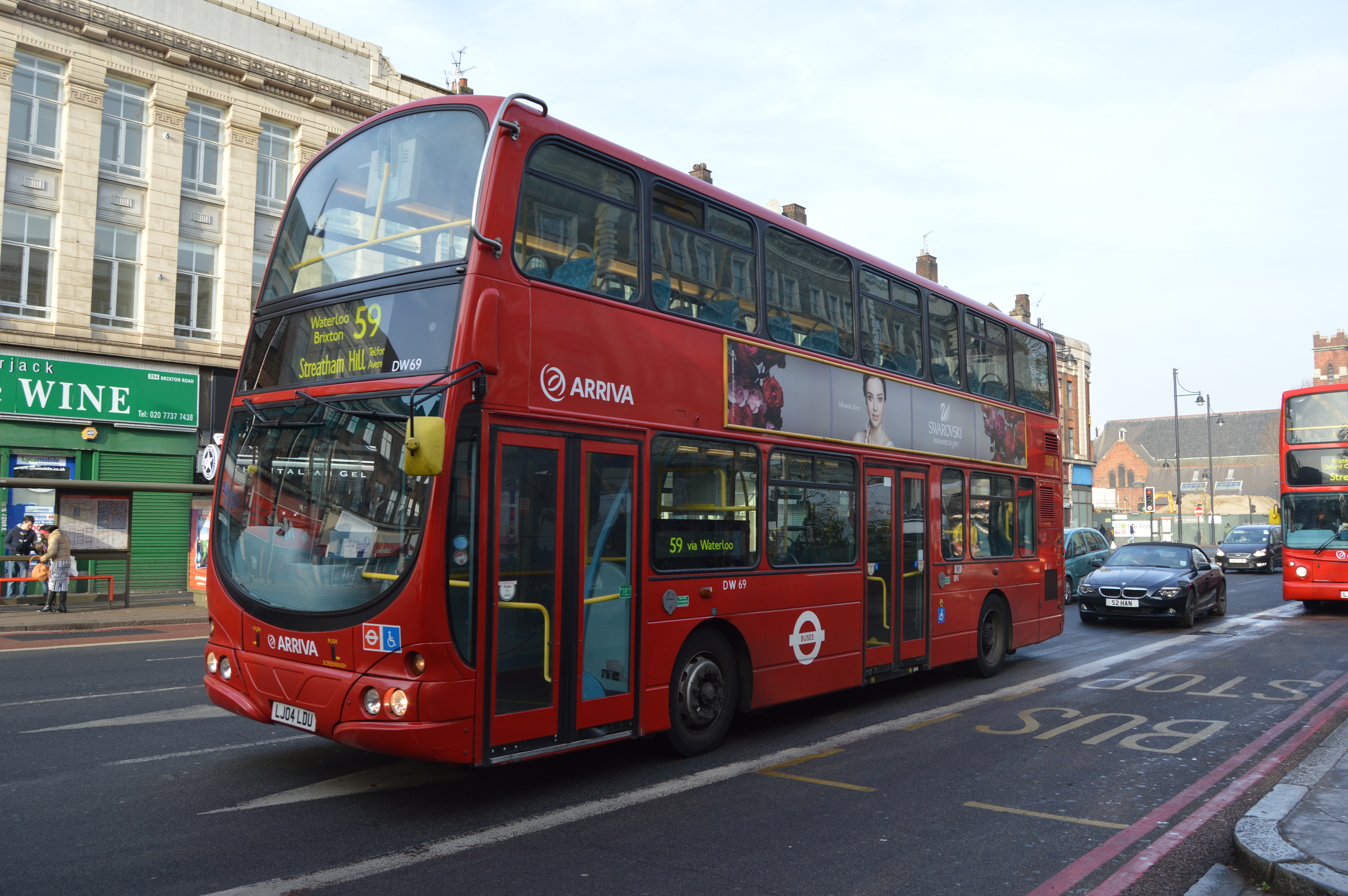
- An Arriva London Wright Pulsar Gemini in Brixton, December 2013

Overview
- Manufacturer: Wrightbus
- Production: 2003–2006
- Assembly: Ballymena, Northern Ireland

Body and chassis
- Doors: 1 or 2
- Floor type: Low-entry
- Chassis: VDL DB250LF
- Related: Wright Pulsar

Powertrain
- Engine: DAF ATi RS 8.6 litre DAF Paccar PS 9.2 litre Ford Puma 2.4l I4 diesel (HEV)
- Capacity: 56–70 seated
- Transmission: Voith DIWA; ZF Ecomat

Dimensions
- Length: 9.6–10.5 m (31–34 ft)
- Width: 2.55 m (8.4 ft)
- Height: 4.4 m (14 ft)

Chronology
- Successor: Wright Gemini 2

The Wright Pulsar Gemini is a design of double-decker bus bodywork built onto VDL DB250LF chassis by Wrightbus between 2003 and 2006. It was visually almost identical to the Wright Eclipse Gemini that was mounted on the Volvo B7TL and later Volvo B9TL chassis.

In 2007, Wrightbus launched the Wright Gemini 2 integral double-decker with VDL DB300 chassis modules as the successor to the Pulsar Gemini in both diesel and hybrid-electric forms.

== Features ==
As with the Wright Eclipse Gemini, this bus has both the upper and lower deck front windscreens forming part of a single oval shape, with the destination display in between. In London, they have two doors for passenger loading, one at the front and one in the centre. The staircase is situated between the front and centre entrances.

== Operators ==
A total of 189 Wright Pulsar Geminis were built.

The Pulsar Gemini was ordered almost exclusively by Arriva UK Bus.

Arriva London subsidiary purchased 134 examples between 2003 and 2005, numbered in the DW series. Arriva Kent Thameside and Arriva The Shires each purchased seven and eleven Pulsar Geminis respectively in 2004 and 2005.

Arriva Midlands purchased 32 for use in Leicester in 2006, which were numbered 4746–77, sharing the 47xx series numbers in the Midlands fleet with other DAF DB250s (with East Lancs Mylennium Lowlanders being numbered 4701-45 and ex-Arriva London Alexander ALX400s being numbered 4778 onwards). These were the last diesel Wright Pulsar Geminis built. The last of these was withdrawn in late 2024, with 2 sold on to Bus Link.

Konectbus purchased five Wright Pulsar Geminis in 2005, becoming the only operator not part of the Arriva Group to purchase them.

== Pulsar Gemini HEV ==
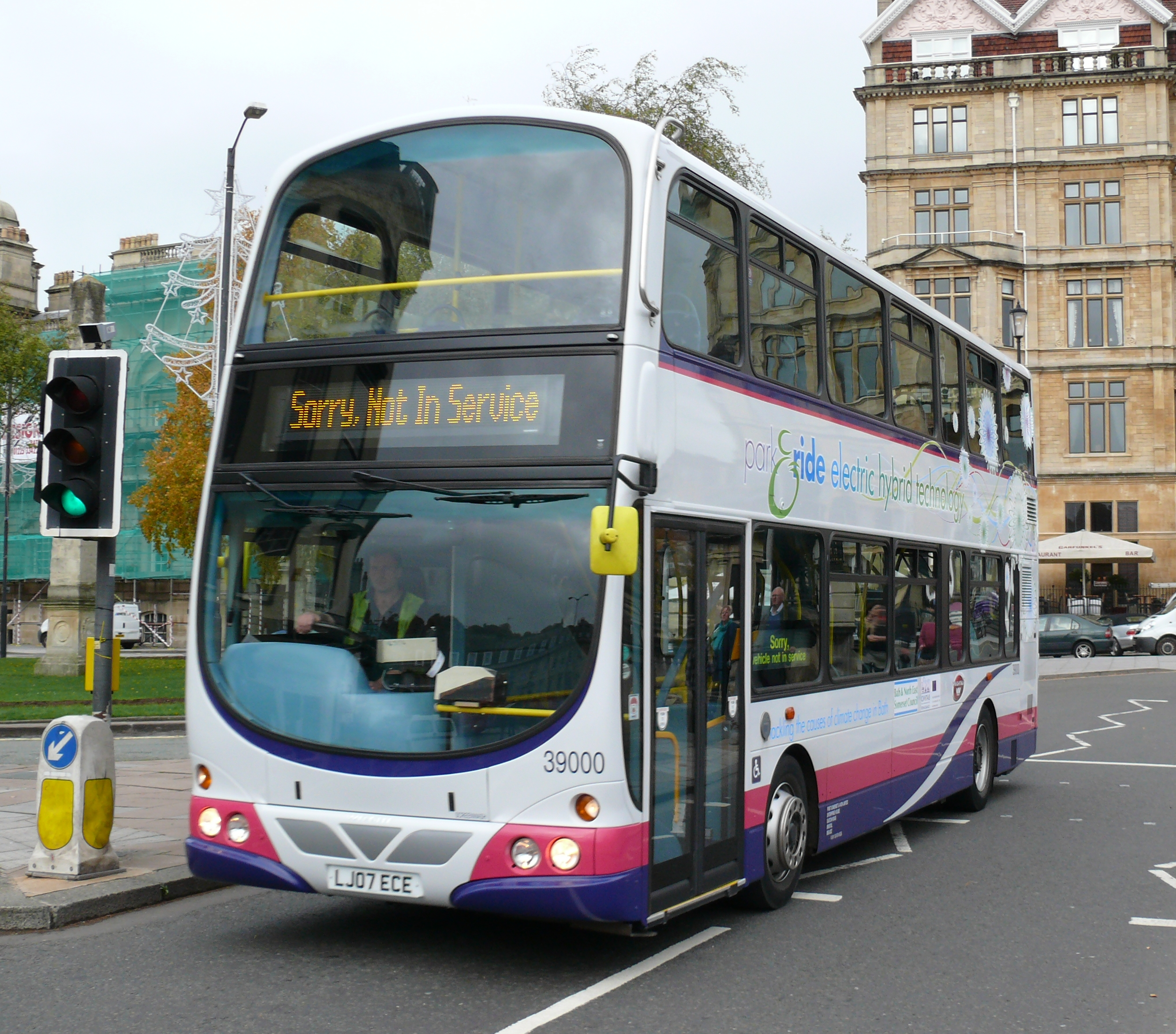
Wright Pulsar Gemini HEV with First Somerset & Avon in Bath.

The Wright Pulsar Gemini HEV was the hybrid-electric variant of the Pulsar Gemini, introduced in 2006. It was the first hybrid double-decker to be built in the United Kingdom. It was based on the same VDL DB250 chassis as the diesel Pulsar Gemini, but with the DAF engine removed and replaced with a smaller Ford Duratorq engine coupled to a hybrid-electric driveline. Only three Pulsar Gemini HEVs were built – as detailed below – before the model was superseded by the introduction of the Wright Gemini 2 HEV in 2007.

=== Production vehicles ===
The first Wright Pulsar Gemini HEV was unveiled by Mayor of London Ken Livingstone in October 2006. After being exhibited at the Euro Bus Expo at the National Exhibition Centre, in March 2007 it entered service with Arriva London on route 141 for evaluation. In 2008 it moved to East Thames Buses' Mandela Way garage for six months, mainly being used on route 1. From August 2010 until February 2012, it operated for First Somerset & Avon in Bath after conversion to single door.

The second production Pulsar Gemini HEV was delivered to Dublin Bus of Ireland in November 2008. It was withdrawn on 31 January 2012, and sold to Ensignbus, where it caught fire on 9 June 2012, due to an electrical fault.

The third and final Pulsar Gemini HEV to be completed was delivered to London General and entered service in January 2009. It left the fleet in early 2012 and entered service with Magtec Buses of Rotherham in 2016 until its withdrawal in 2019.

== Gallery ==
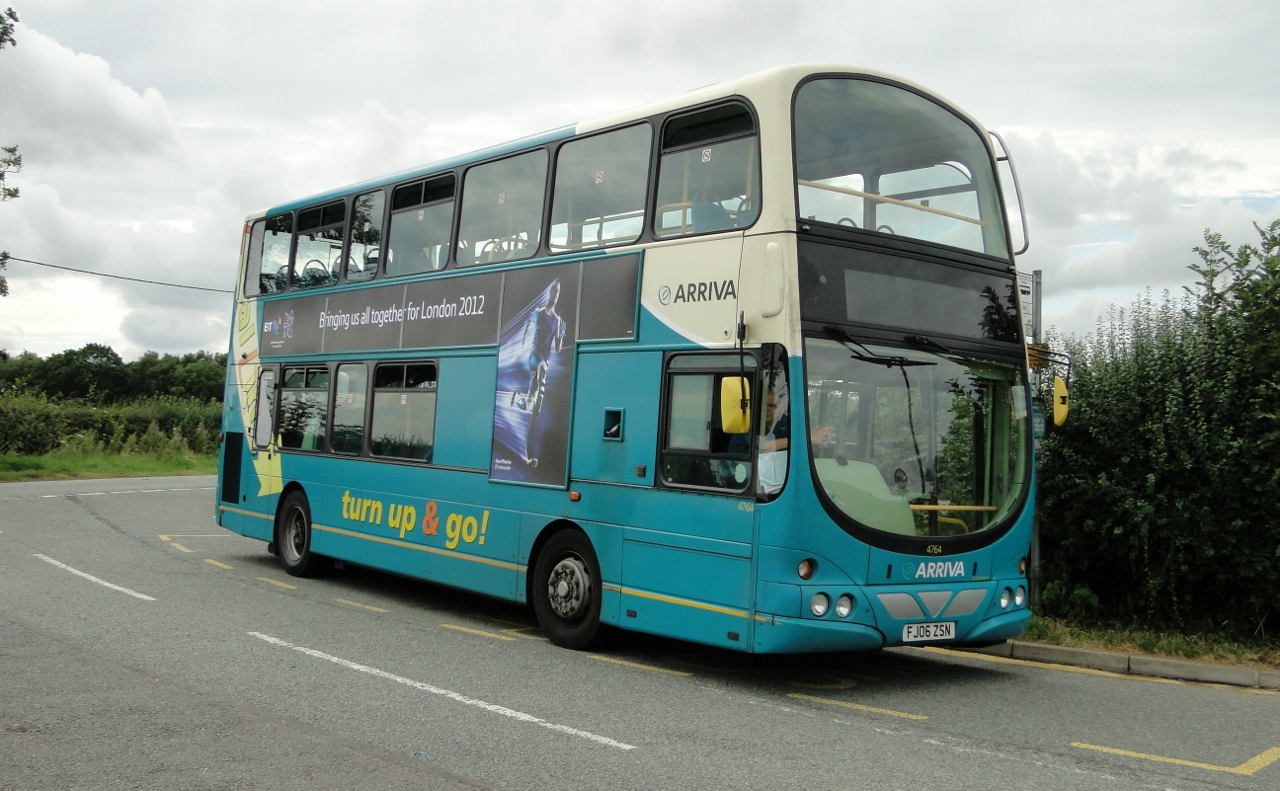
An example of Arriva Midlands' Pulsar Geminis in original livery

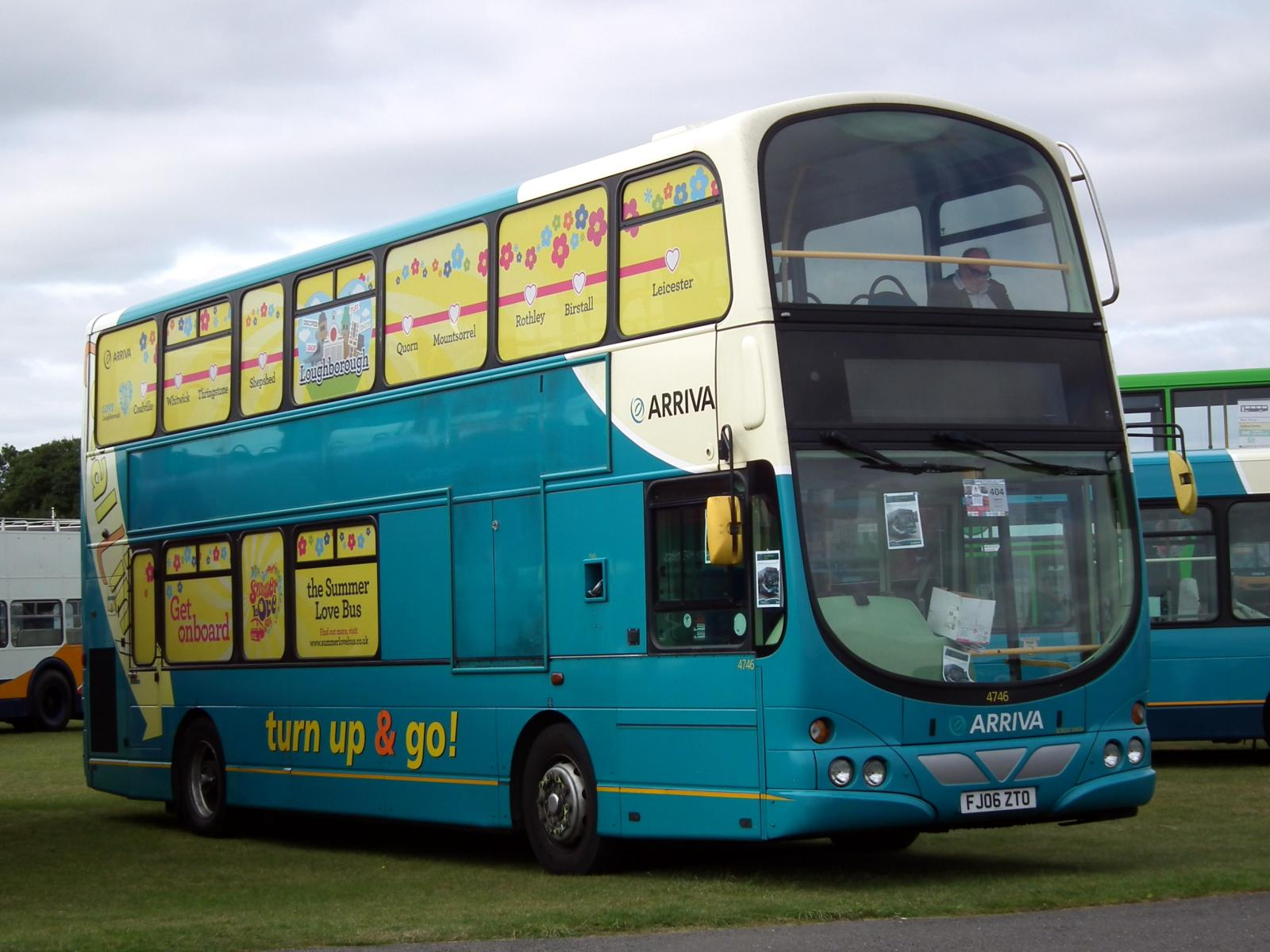
An example of Arriva Midlands' Pulsar Geminis, this one with special vinyls advertising services 126 and 127 between Coalville, Shepshed and Leicester via Loughborough

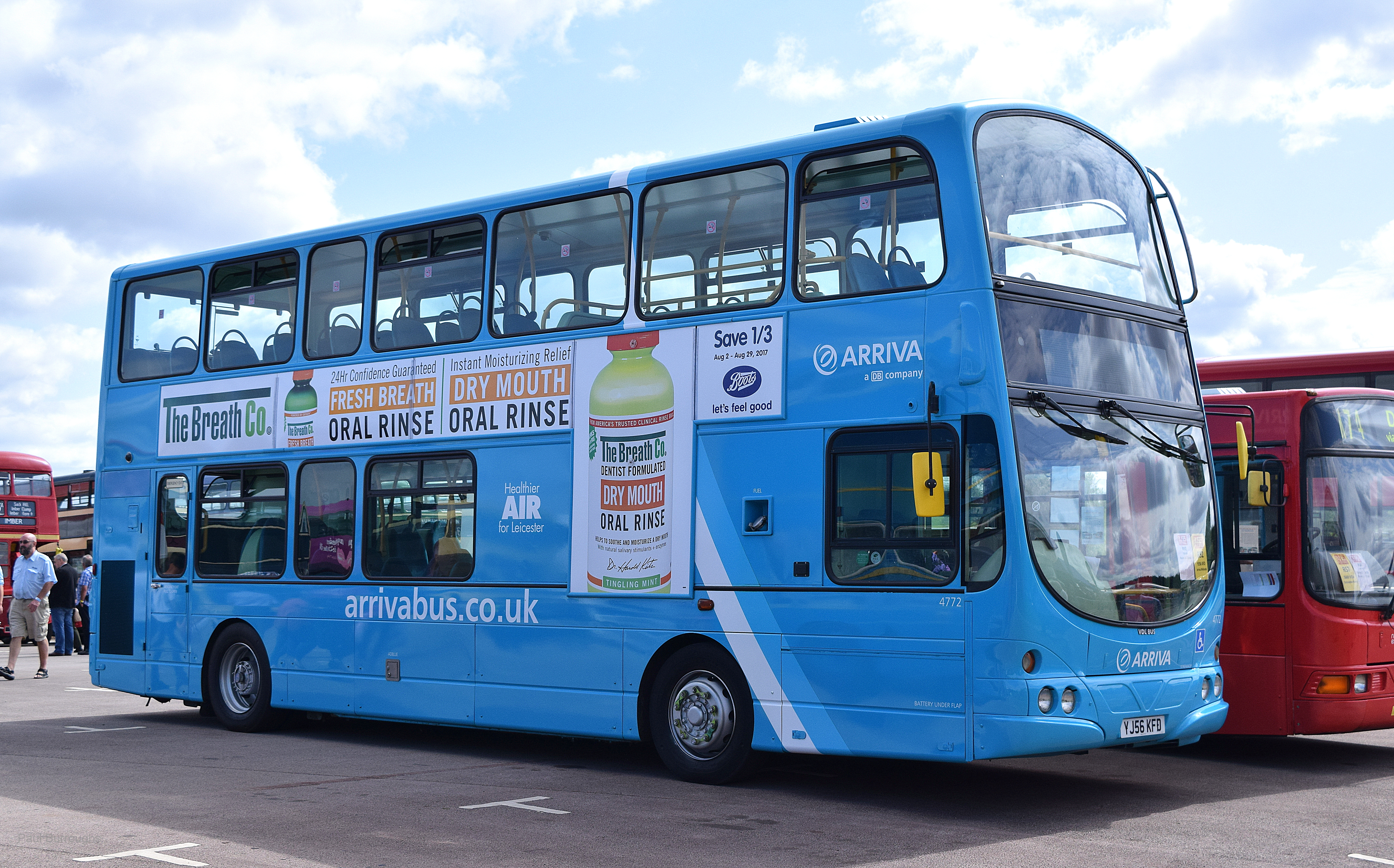
An example of Arriva Midlands' Pulsar Geminis in Arriva's standard Journey Mark livery

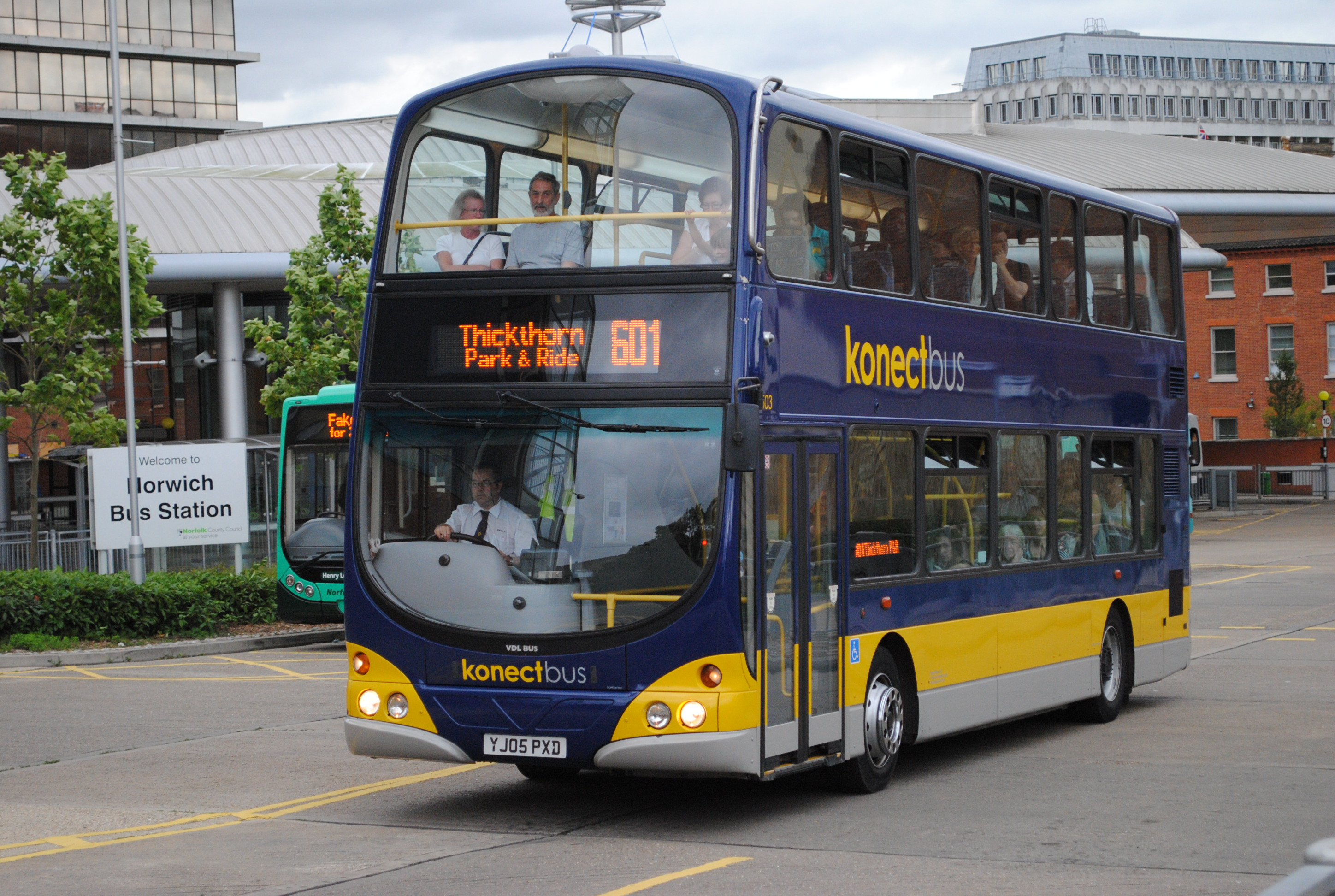
Konectbus Wright Pulsar Gemini

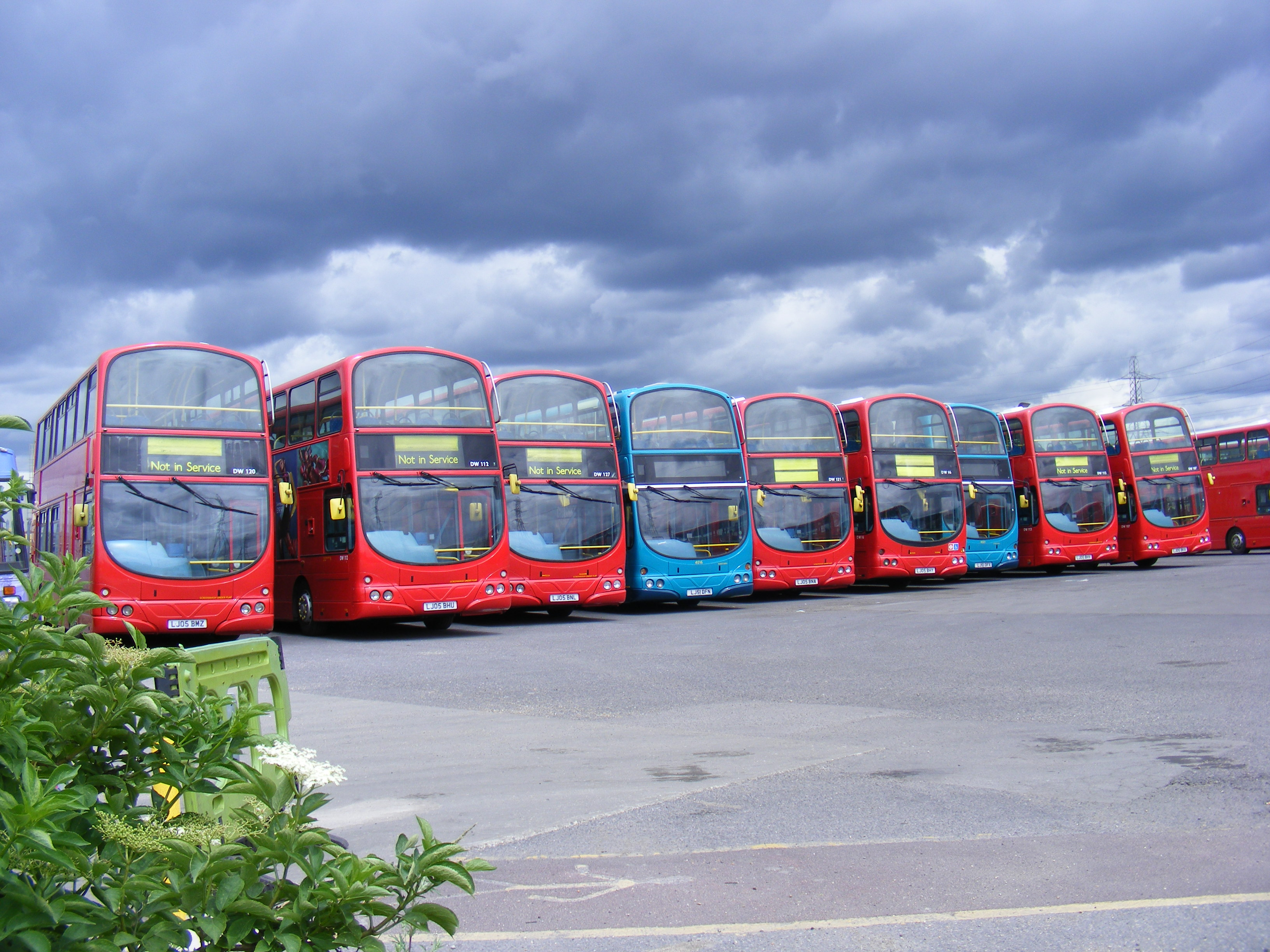
Lineup of Wright Pulsar Geminis (the two blue buses are Wright Eclipse Geminis)
