= Optare Vecta =

Single-deck bus body on MAN 11.190 chassis

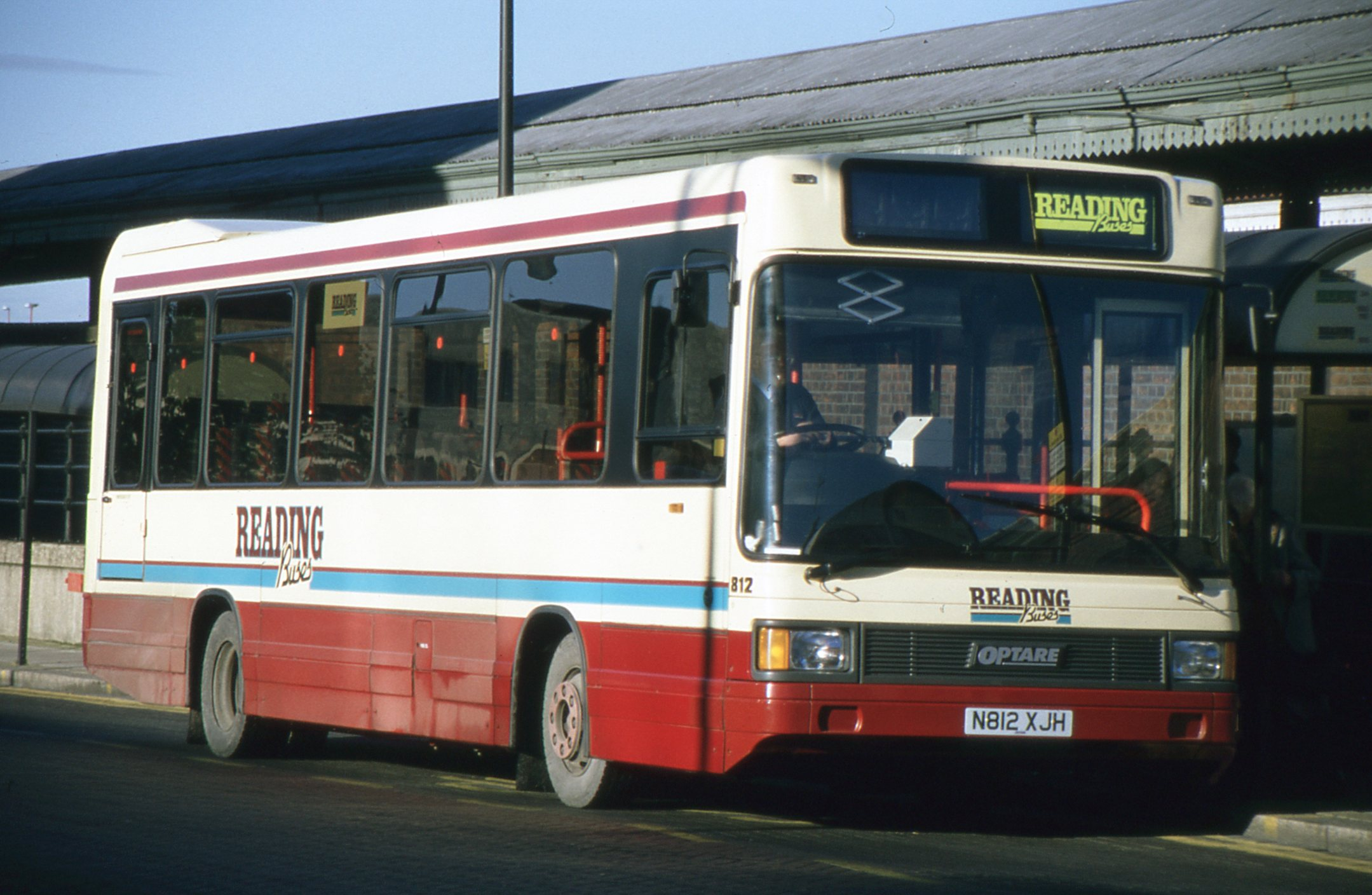
- Reading Buses Optare Vecta bodied MAN 11.190 at Reading railway station

Overview
- Manufacturer: Optare
- Production: 1991 - 1997
- Assembly: Cross Gates, Leeds, England

Body and chassis
- Doors: 1
- Floor type: Step entrance
- Chassis: MAN 11.190
- Related: Optare Spectra; Optare Sigma

Powertrain
- Engine: MAN D0826 TOH
- Capacity: 42-45 seated, 19 standing

Dimensions
- Length: 10.2 metres (33 ft)
- Width: 2.50 metres (8 ft 2 in)
- Height: 3.00 metres (9.84 ft)
- Curb weight: 11,500 kilograms (25,400 lb)

Chronology
- Successor: Optare Excel

The Optare Vecta was a step-entrance single-deck bus body manufactured by Optare between 1991 and 1997 on the MAN 11.190 chassis.

== Design ==
Launched in 1991, the medium-length Vecta was designed by Optare to fill a gap in its product lineup between the Delta full-size city bus body on the DAF SB220 chassis and the integral MetroRider minibus. Based exclusively on the MAN 11.190 chassis, the first time this chassis had been built with a bus body for the UK market, the Vecta body was constructed with an Alusuisse bolted aluminium frame and shared design elements from the Delta body, including rounded windows, rear panels and a separately mounted destination display. However, the Vecta featured a straight front end that was later reused for Optare's Spectra double-decker bus.

As a result of smaller-than-average wheels being fitted to the MAN chassis, the Vecta had a low entrance step height of 295 millimetres (11.6 in). Two 195 millimetres (7.7 in) gangway steps led to the first five rows of interior seats, followed by another step that took passengers to the next four rows of seats. Options for the interior included carpet trim on the roof and walls, luggage racks and high-backed seats.

== Operators ==
The largest operator of Optare Vectas were North East Bus companies Teesside Motor Services, Tees & District and United, taking delivery of a total of 51 between 1992 and 1994. The first two production Vectas were delivered to Teesside Motor Services in early 1992, with Teesside later taking a further six in late 1993, while Tees & District took delivery of 25 Vectas and United took delivery of 18.

Trent Buses were another large operator of the Vecta, taking delivery of 15 in late 1994. while Reading Buses initially purchased five in 1993, following with orders for nine more between 1994 and 1996. London United subsidiary Westlink, meanwhile, were the only major London bus operator that purchased the Optare Vecta, taking delivery of eight of the type in mid-1995.

The remaining majority of the Optare Vecta's customers were small independent bus and coach operators across the United Kingdom. The most notable of these was Hutchison's of Overtown, who purchased seven Vectas new as well as two former demonstrators between 1993 and 1996. An early adopter, meanwhile, of the Vecta was West Coast Motors, taking delivery of a single example in 1992 for use on town services. Other operators included Black Prince Buses of Morley, who purchased four in 1995 as the company's first brand new buses, R&I Buses of Park Royal, who took delivery of five in 1995, British Bus subsidiary Crosville Cymru, who took delivery of four in 1995, and the Tillingbourne Bus Company, who took delivery of the final four Vectas produced in 1997.
