= Capital Logistics =

British bus operating company

- Founded: August 1997
- Ceased operation: June 1999
- Service area: London
- Service type: Bus & coach operator

Capital Logistics was a bus and coach operator in London.

== History ==
Capital Logistics was formed in August 1997 following the merger of Whyte's Airport Services and Capital Coaches the previous April.

It operated a variety of coach and contract services around London Heathrow Airport, and some London Regional Transport services, including route H26 Hoppa minibus service. This route used Mercedes-Benz 709D minibuses fitted with wheelchair lifts and was supported by Hounslow Council.

In September 1998, Capital Logistics was due to take over route 60. Problems with delivery of buses meant that the company could not start the contract on time, and the route was temporarily operated by no less than eight different operators on an ad hoc basis, with double sub-contracting.

On 11 March 1999, Capital was able to operate the route with 16 DAF DB250s, six with Optare Spectra bodywork and 10 with Plaxton President bodywork. Some buses ran with Capital Connections branding.

Capital Logistics also operated Connections branded Optare Excels on route U3 and the ex Green Line route 726 gained from London Coaches, replacing the Ikarus 480-bodied DAF SB220s initially used.

Capital Logistics was sold to Tellings-Golden Miller on 1 June 1999. In April 2000 AirLinks acquired the airport coach business.
