= Wright Gemini 2 =

- Arriva London Wright Gemini 2 DL at West Croydon Bus Station in March 2018

Overview
- Manufacturer: Wrightbus
- Production: 2007 - 2014
- Assembly: Ballymena, Northern Ireland

Body and chassis
- Doors: 1 or 2
- Floor type: Low floor
- Chassis: VDL DB300
- Related: Wright Eclipse Gemini 2 Wright Pulsar 2

Powertrain
- Engine: Gemini 2 DL: Cummins ISBe 6-cylinder, Euro V, 6,692 cc Gemini 2 HEV: Ford Duratorq 'Puma' 4-cylinder
- Transmission: Gemini 2 DL: Voith / ZF Friedrichshafen; Gemini 2 HEV: Siemens series hybrid drivetrain

Dimensions
- Length: 10.4 metres
- Width: 2.52 metres
- Height: 4.23 or 4.40 metres

Chronology
- Predecessor: Wright Pulsar Gemini; Wright Pulsar Gemini HEV
- Successor: Wright StreetDeck

The Wright Gemini 2 is a double-decker bus built by Wrightbus between 2007 and 2014. It was announced in December 2007 but was not named until 2008. It was constructed as a semi-integral vehicle, with chassis modules provided by VDL. The bodywork utilised some lighter materials so that the vehicle was lighter than the Eclipse Gemini and Pulsar Gemini bodied buses. It was available in two versions; the Gemini 2 DL diesel-powered version, and the Gemini 2 HEV diesel-electric hybrid version.

In 2014, the Gemini 2 was superseded by the StreetDeck.

== Versions ==
The Gemini 2 was launched in 2007 as the replacement for the Pulsar Gemini and one-off Pulsar Gemini HEV. It was semi-integral, being based on the updated VDL DB300 chassis. The first two were produced with identical bodywork to the original Pulsar Gemini, however, on subsequent production models, the front and rear ends of the body were facelifted to match the Volvo based Eclipse Gemini 2. It was unveiled at the National Exhibition Centre in November 2008, with a First London Gemini 2 HEV appearing at the show.

=== Gemini 2 DL ===
The Gemini 2 DL was offered with Cummins ISBe 6-cylinder Euro V engines with Voith or ZF Friedrichshafen gearboxes. A total of 462 Gemini 2 DLs were built between 2009 and 2013, mainly for Arriva, including 322 for its Arriva London subsidiary. First London and London General were the only other customers, taking four and one respectively. A low height version with a flat roof was introduced in 2009 with Arriva North East and Arriva Yorkshire the first customers.

=== Gemini 2 HEV ===
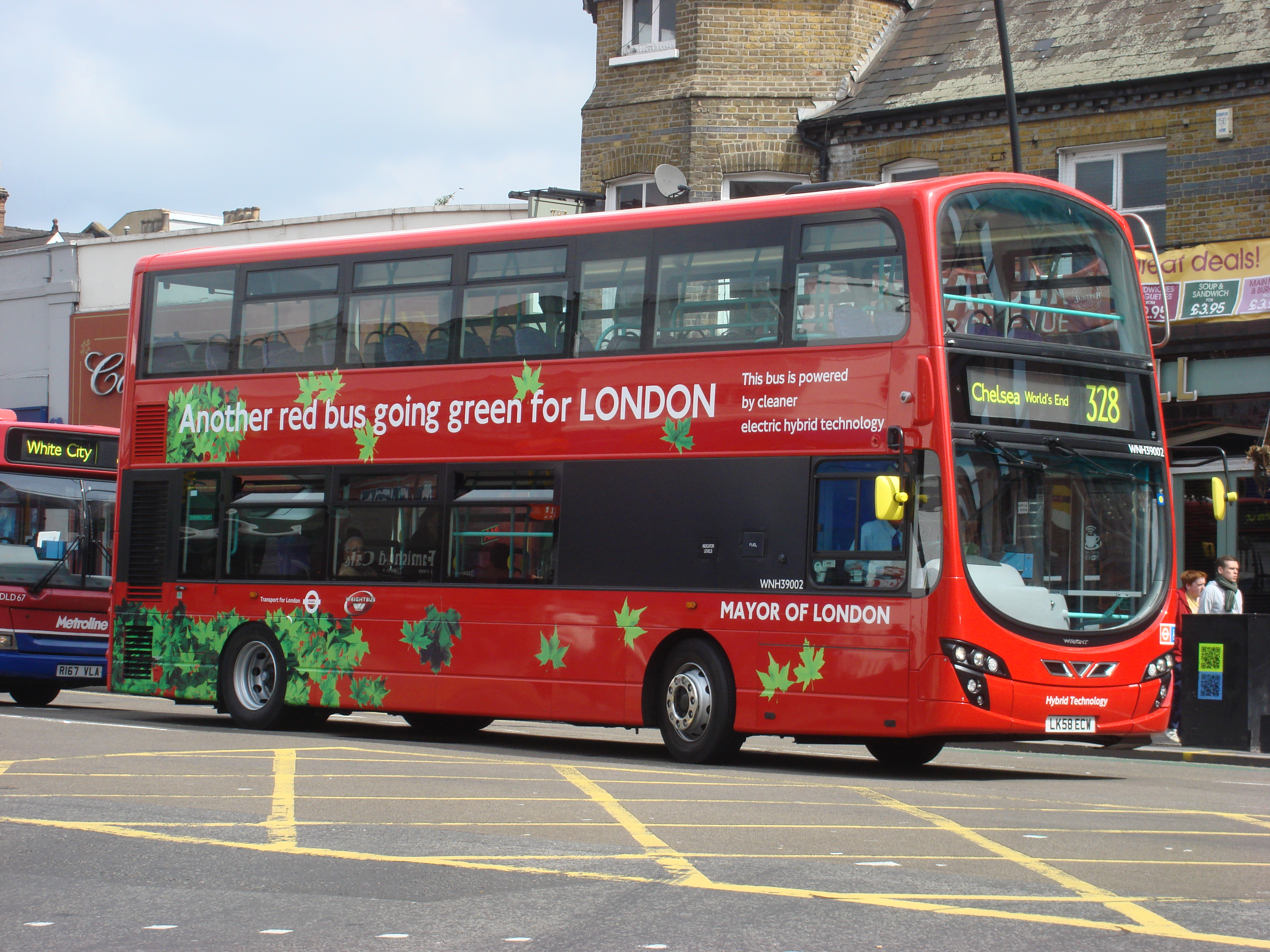
First London Wright Gemini HEV 2 on Kilburn High Road in May 2009

The Gemini 2 HEV was offered with a Siemens series hybrid drive system with a 2.4 litre 4-cylinder Ford Duratorq Puma Diesel engine for power generation.

Ten Gemini 2 HEVs were built, Arriva London and First London each purchased five for use on routes 141 and 328. Arriva's were sold to Ensignbus and later to Crosville Motor Services for use as open top buses in Weston-super-Mare until its withdrawal in 2017 while First's were transferred to First West of England and First York until their withdrawal in 2023.
