= London Buses route 60 =

London bus route

60
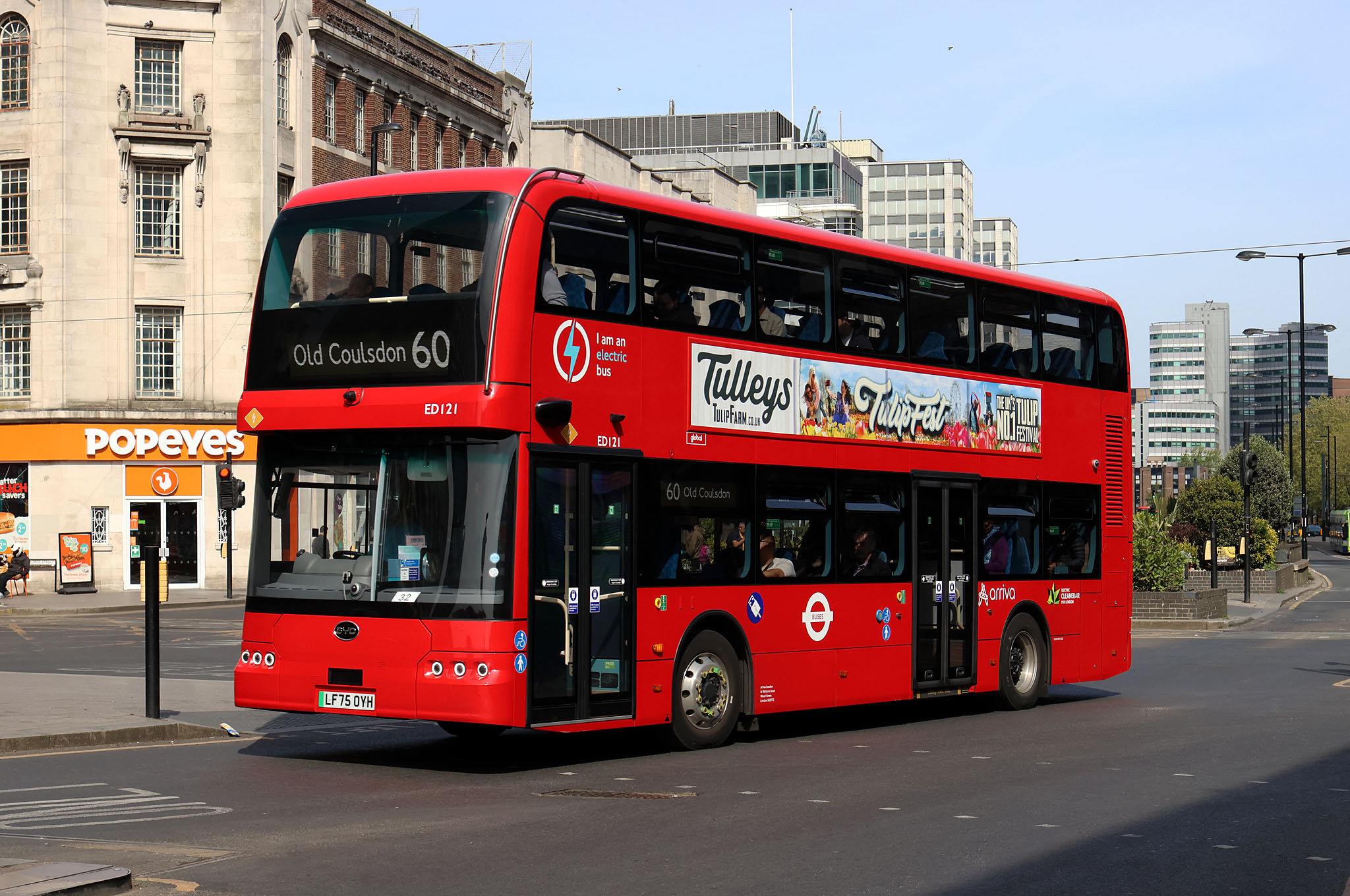
- Arriva London BYD BD11B in Croydon in April 2026

Overview
- Operator: Arriva London
- Garage: Croydon
- Night-time: N68

Route
- Start: Oasis Academy Coulsdon (one afternoon schoolday-only journey to Streatham station); Old Coulsdon
- Via: Coulsdon; Purley; South Croydon; Croydon; Broad Green; Thornton Heath Pond; Pollards Hill; Streatham Vale; Streatham Common
- End: Streatham station

London Buses route 60 is a Transport for London contracted bus route in London, England. Running between Oasis Academy Coulsdon and Streatham station, it is operated by Arriva London.

== History ==
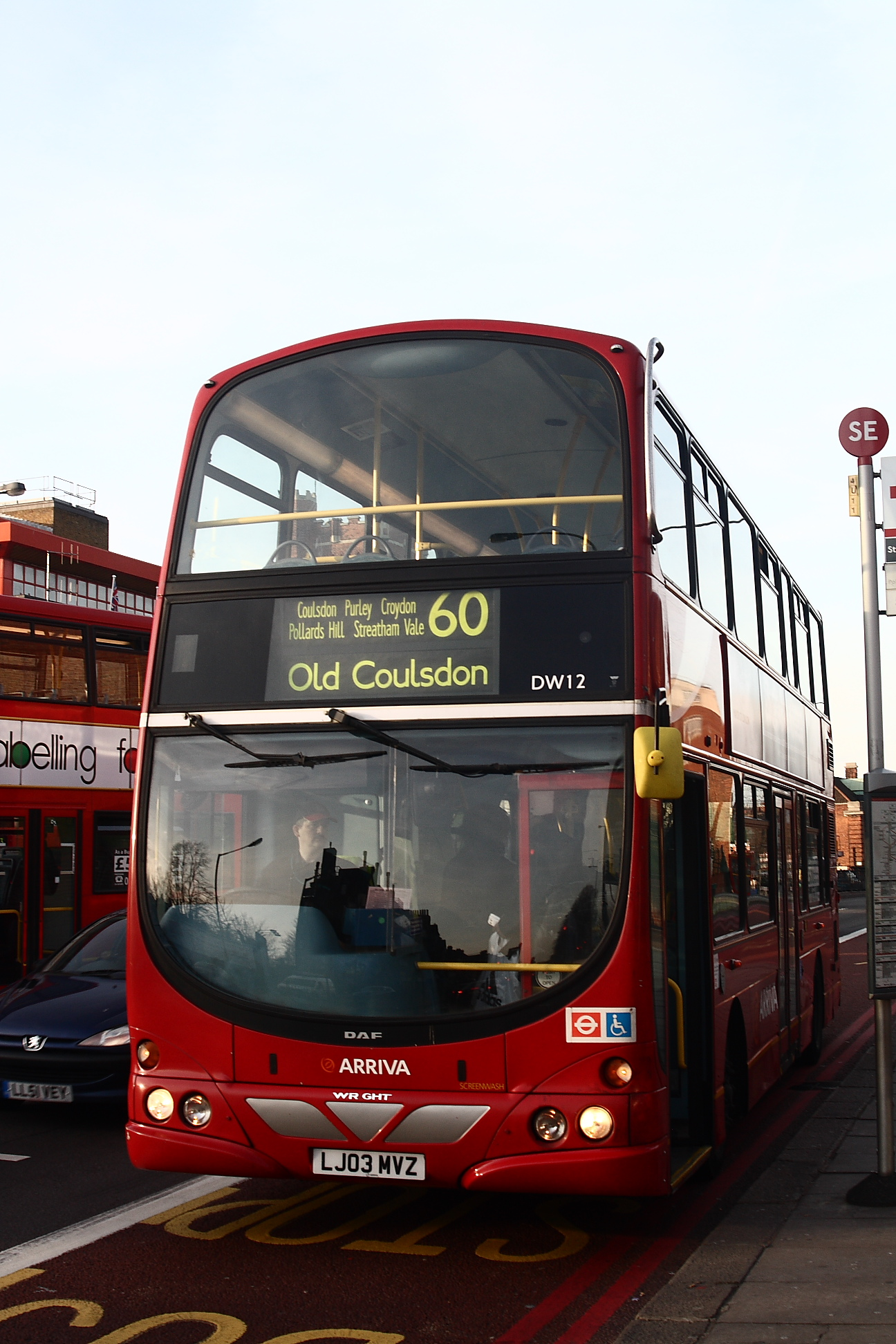
Arriva London Wright Eclipse Gemini bodied DAF DB250 on route 60 in January 2008

Route 60 was introduced in September 1982 as a replacement in part for routes 118 and 130, linking Clapham Common with Croydon. In 1998, the route was extended south to Old Coulsdon, replacing route 50 and curtailed northbound to Streatham.

Capital Logistics was due to start operating route 60 from September 1998, however the new low-floor buses specified were not ready in time. Stagecoach Selkent had lost work at the same time and was able to step in to operate most of the service. Blue Triangle of Rainham was subcontracted to provide the balance of four buses. This arrangement lasted until 25 January 1999, when Selkent had other commitments in the Bromley and Plumstead areas.

It was intended that the route would then be taken on by Horsham based Omnibus London, but two days before this could take place the company announced that it would not be able to cover most of its journeys. An emergency 15-minute frequency timetable was drawn up by Blue Triangle, and the duties were covered by whoever could supply buses and drivers. Companies operating on the route included Blue Triangle, Omnibus London, Stagecoach Selkent, Stagecoach East London, Capital Citybus, Nostalgiabus of Mitcham, Classic Coaches of High Wycombe and Sidney Road Travel of Potters Bar.

This continued until 11 March 1999, when Capital Logistics was able to take the route over in full using DAF DB250LFs. Buses were operated from a new base in Commerce Way and the route's frequency restored to every 12 minutes. Route 60 was included in the sale of Capital Logistics to the Status Group, (owner of Tellings-Golden Miller), on 1 June 1999. The new owner was unhappy with the terms of the contract on the route, and withdrew from it in early 2000. The route passed back to Arriva London on 4 March 2000 on an interim basis.

Upon being re-tendered, route 60 passed to Connex on 1 September 2001. New Dennis Trident 2s were ordered for the route, but a slight delay in their delivery meant that similar buses were hired from Stagecoach Selkent for the first few weeks of operation. Route 60 was included in the sale of Connex to Travel London in February 2004.

It was retained by Arriva London when re-tendered in 2006. In April 2009, the reliability of the route was criticised by some residents in Coulsdon. In October of the same year a bus operating on the route was involved in a minor accident in West Croydon. Upon being re-tendered on 31 January 2013, the route was retained by Arriva London.

== Current route ==
Route 60 operates via these primary locations:

- Oasis Academy Coulsdon (one afternoon schoolday-only journey to Streatham station)
- Old Coulsdon
- Coulsdon South station
- Coulsdon Town station
- Purley
- South Croydon
- West Croydon bus station for West Croydon station
- Broad Green
- Thornton Heath Pond
- Pollards Hill
- Streatham Vale
- Streatham Common station
- Streatham station
