= Black Prince Buses =

Former West Yorkshire bus operator

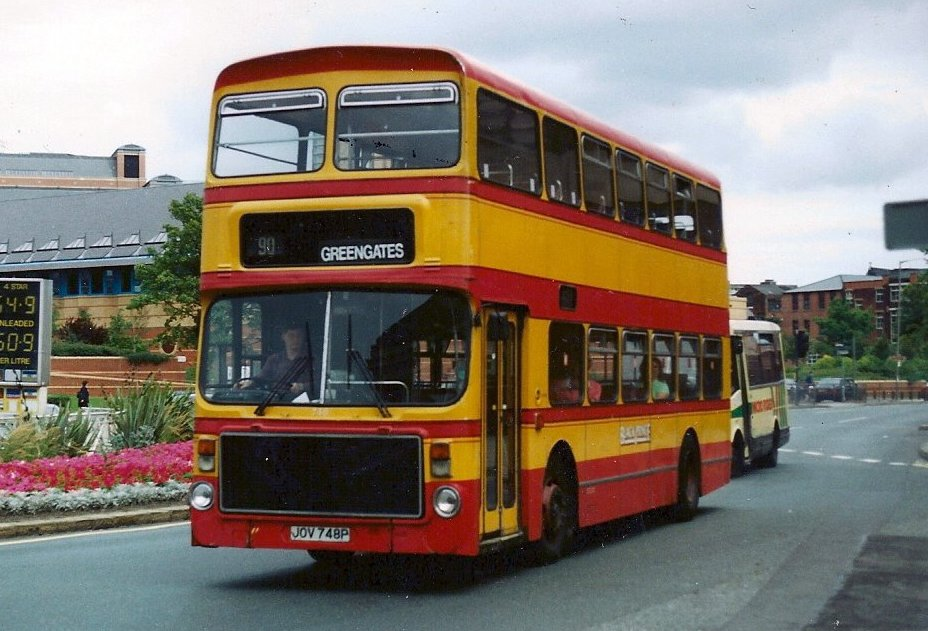
- Black Prince Volvo Ailsa B55 in Leeds in 1993
- Parent: Brian Crowther
- Founded: 1969
- Ceased operation: 2005
- Headquarters: Morley
- Service area: West Yorkshire
- Service type: Bus operator
- Fleet: 40 (2005)

Black Prince Buses was a bus company based in Morley, West Yorkshire. Founded in 1969 as a coach firm, it expanded into local bus operation following deregulation in 1986. Black Prince was taken over by FirstGroup in July 2005.

== History ==
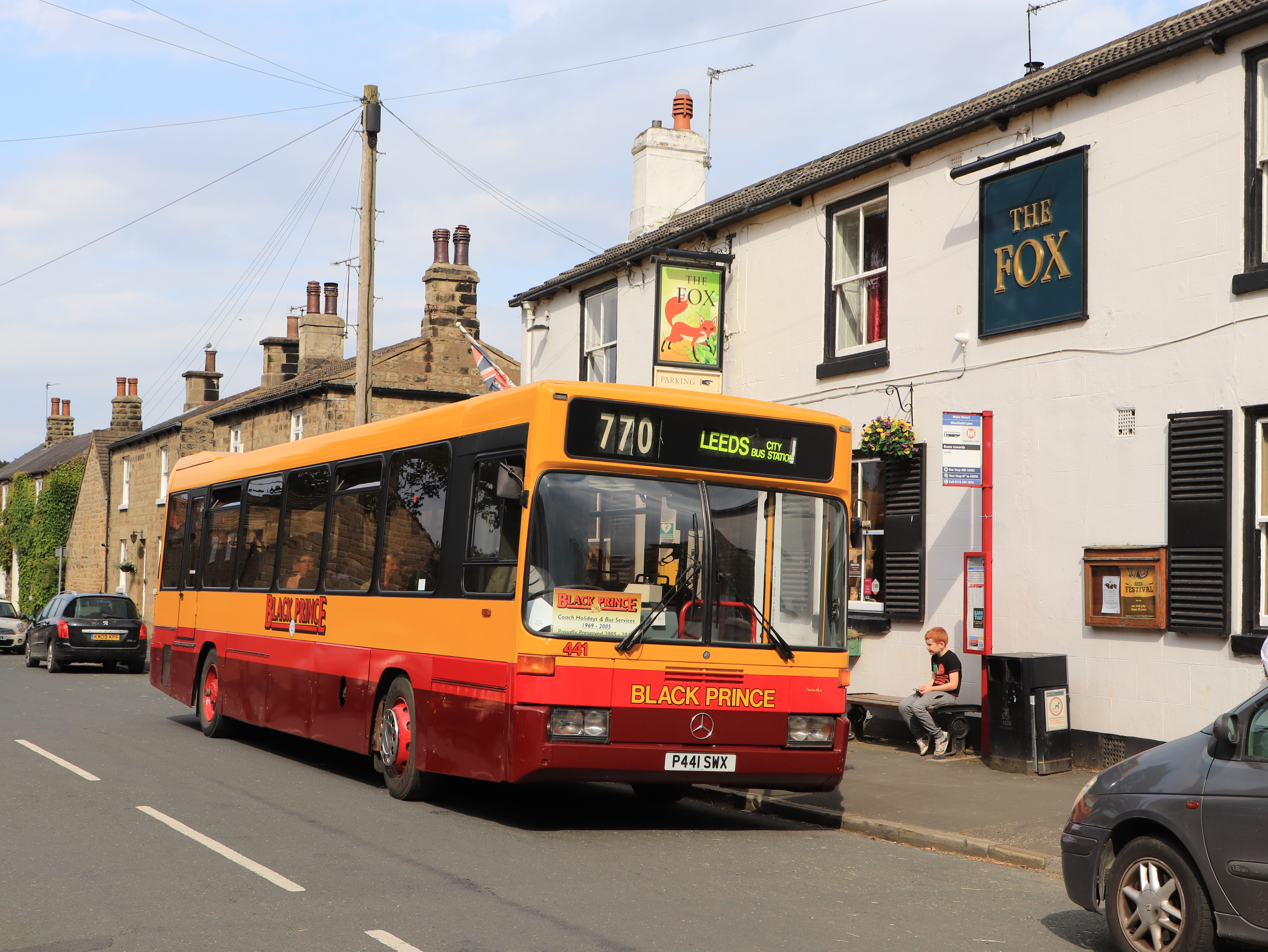
Preserved Black Prince Optare Prisma in Thorner in July 2019

Black Prince was founded as a coach hire firm 1969 by Brian Crowther, a former employee of British Rail. Its name was inspired by Edward, the Black Prince, a statue of whom stands in the centre of Leeds.

In 1986, deregulation introduced on-road competition local bus service operation. Black Prince moved into scheduled service operation, launching a number of routes centred on Morley in competition with Yorkshire Rider. A variety of second-hand vehicles were acquired to operate the routes, and a livery of red and yellow introduced. The company would be hit with three operating license duration cuts by the Department of Transport between 1995 and 1997, with a DoT hearing in July 1997 regarding serious vehicle maintenance defects resulting in the number of Black Prince's bus fleet and operated services being halved.

By 2004, Black Prince operated a fleet of 40 vehicles on a network of routes around Leeds, with an annual turnover of almost £3 million. Many of its routes competed with Yorkshire Rider's successor First Leeds.

== Sale and subsequent history ==
In February 2005, as a result of Brian Crowther's impending retirement due to ill health, the FirstGroup announced it had agreed to acquire the routes and staff of Black Prince. Although this move reduced competition in Leeds, it was approved by the Office of Fair Trading as Black Prince had intended to close if the acquisition had not taken place. This was one of the first uses of the failing-firm defence, which was created under the Enterprise Act 2002.

The takeover was completed on 31 July 2005. Several service changes were made to reduce competition with existing First Leeds routes. Planning permission was originally granted for the company's depot in Morley to be demolished and replaced by a supermarket. This did not take place, and in 2009 work instead began on a housing development at the site; however, this was halted by the economic downturn and the site remained empty until late 2012, when a new housing development was proposed.

Black Prince was the last family-owned independent bus operator in Leeds prior to the takeover. In August 2005 a commemorative die-cast model of a Black Prince vehicle was released by Britbus.

In January 2006, one of the replacement routes introduced by First was criticised for failing to serve the Lingfields estate. First stated that the service was not commercially viable.

Black Prince's founder Brian Crowther died in February 2008.

Annually on Christmas Day, a preserved Black Prince Optare Prisma is operated on the route of the former X51 from Tingley Mills in Morley to Leeds General Infirmary and St James's University Hospital. This service is run for free to help provide transport for workers or families visiting sick relatives in hospitals, as no bus services run in Leeds on Christmas Day.
