= Glenvale Transport =

Bus operator in Liverpool, Merseyside, England

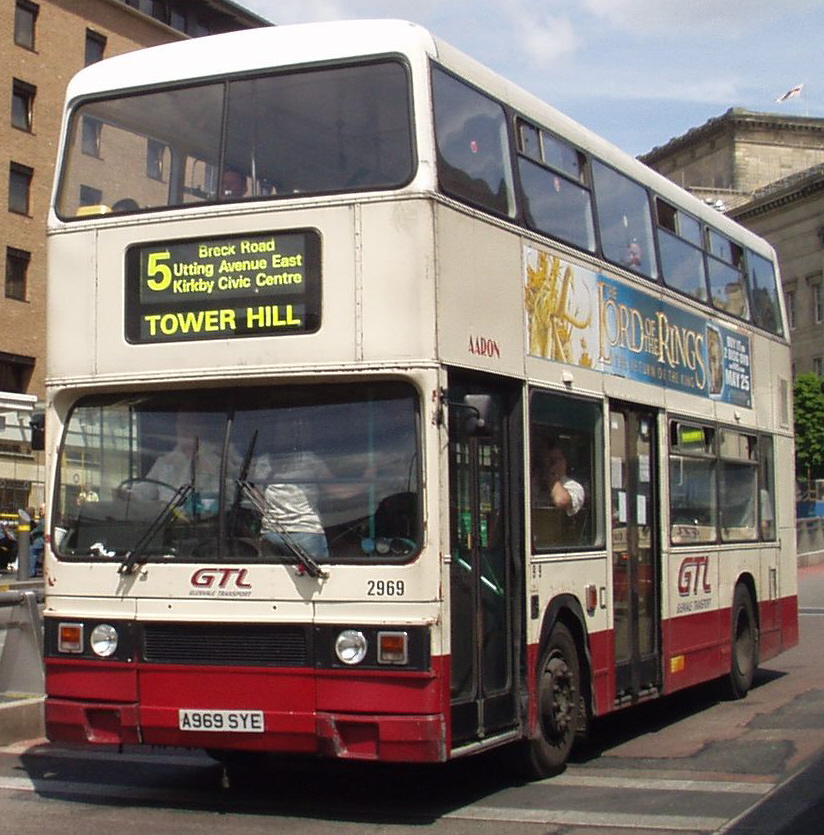
- Glenvale Transport Leyland Titan at Queen Square bus station in Liverpool in May 2004
- Parent: Dominic Brady; Ian Campbell
- Founded: 15 July 2001; 24 years ago
- Ceased operation: 13 July 2005; 20 years ago
- Headquarters: Gillmoss, Liverpool, Merseyside, England
- Service area: Merseyside
- Service type: Bus
- Depots: 2
- Fleet: 330 (December 2003)

Glenvale Transport (GTL) was a bus company that operated services in Liverpool between July 2001 and July 2005.

== History ==
=== Formation ===
During the privatisation of the National Bus Company, the reformed North Western Road Car Company was sold to the Drawlane Group, which was restructured in 1992 as British Bus. On 1 August 1996, British Bus was purchased by the Cowie Group and in 1997 was rebranded as Arriva.

By 2000, Arriva North West & Wales (as North Western had become) had built up a substantial presence in many parts of Merseyside, Cheshire, Greater Manchester and West Lancashire. In February 2000, Merseyside's largest bus operator MTL Trust Holdings was purchased by Arriva for £85 million (equivalent to £150,316,000 in 2025). The acquisition and subsequent merger of the former MTL companies into Arriva North West gave Arriva a dominant position on Merseyside and in Liverpool in particular. A condition of the sale was that Arriva dispose of MTL's Gillmoss garage.

The bus corridors of South/East Liverpool were lucrative and had experienced more competition than those to the North of Liverpool and it was Liverpool's Gillmoss depot on the East Lancashire Road that Arriva offered for sale. The sale of Gillmoss, however, would turn out to be a protracted process. Its most profitable routes - 12/13 (Stockbridge Village Circular - Liverpool), 14 (Croxteth - Liverpool) and 53/55 (Thornton/Old Roan - Liverpool) were allowed to remain with Arriva Merseyside/North West and were transferred to its Green Lane and Bootle garages. It is unknown whether this deterred prospective buyers but an early buyer did emerge in the form of Go-Ahead Group who considered Gillmoss as similar to its Go North East operation and therefore almost came to an agreement to buy Gillmoss in 2001. However at the 11th hour, Go-Ahead pulled out of the deal.

Arriva was having difficulty selling Gillmoss and put a proposal to the Competition Commission to re-invest in Gillmoss if it were allowed to keep the depot. The Competition Commission refused and the search for a buyer continued. In the Spring/Summer of 2001 a number of bids began to emerge. Merseyside's largest independent operator, CMT Buses, DelGro Corporation, the Stagecoach Group and MTL (Gillmoss) Ltd, a management buyout fronted by ex-MTL managers Dominic Brady and Ian Campbell lodged bids. The latter was successful and MTL (Gillmoss) Ltd, later renamed to Glenvale Transport after Dominic Brady's racehorse Glen Vale Walk, took over from Arriva on 15 July 2001.

The protracted sale of Gillmoss depot led to poor staff morale, compounded by Arriva using Gillmoss as a dumping ground for the remaining ex-London Buses Leyland Titans that Merseybus/MTL had been acquiring since the end of 1992. Gillmoss did have a modern fleet of 25 Northern Counties Palatine II bodied Volvo Olympians that Liverbus and Merseybus/MTL North had bought new between them in 1995 and 1998 respectively and had been dubbed The Millennium Fleet. However GTL decided to not take up the leases for these buses and they remained with Arriva Merseyside who transferred them mostly to the Speke and Green Lane depots in Liverpool along with a handful for the Laird Street depot in Birkenhead. In return around 30 MCW Metrobuses which were more than 20 years old and had previously operated for Arriva Croydon & North Surrey and had been refurbished in 1999. MTL's cream and crimson livery was retained.

As a result of the Competition Commission's requirements Arriva North West & Wales could not compete on GTL's core route network in North Liverpool and Kirkby for three years and GTL decided to exploit this advantage: the next 18 months saw GTL rapidly expanding its route network throughout much of Merseyside. GTL promised investment in new vehicles for Gillmoss, however this never materialised.

Instead further ex-London vehicles in the form of another large batch of Leyland Titans, along with Reeve Burgess/Plaxton Pointer bodied Dennis Darts and a smaller batch of MCW Metrobuses (some of which briefly operated in the liveries of their former owners) were acquired and at its peak GTL acquired a fleet of around 120 Titans and 60 Metrobuses. GTL's newest vehicles in 2000 were a batch of 11 Marshall Capital bodied Dennis Dart SLFs - which were the last batch of vehicles to be purchased new by MTL in 1999, and eight 1997 East Lancs Spryte bodied Dennis Dart SLFs acquired secondhand from Speke-based Express Travel in 2002. Furthermore, these vehicles only usually operated Merseytravel contracts.

== CMT Buses ==
=== History ===
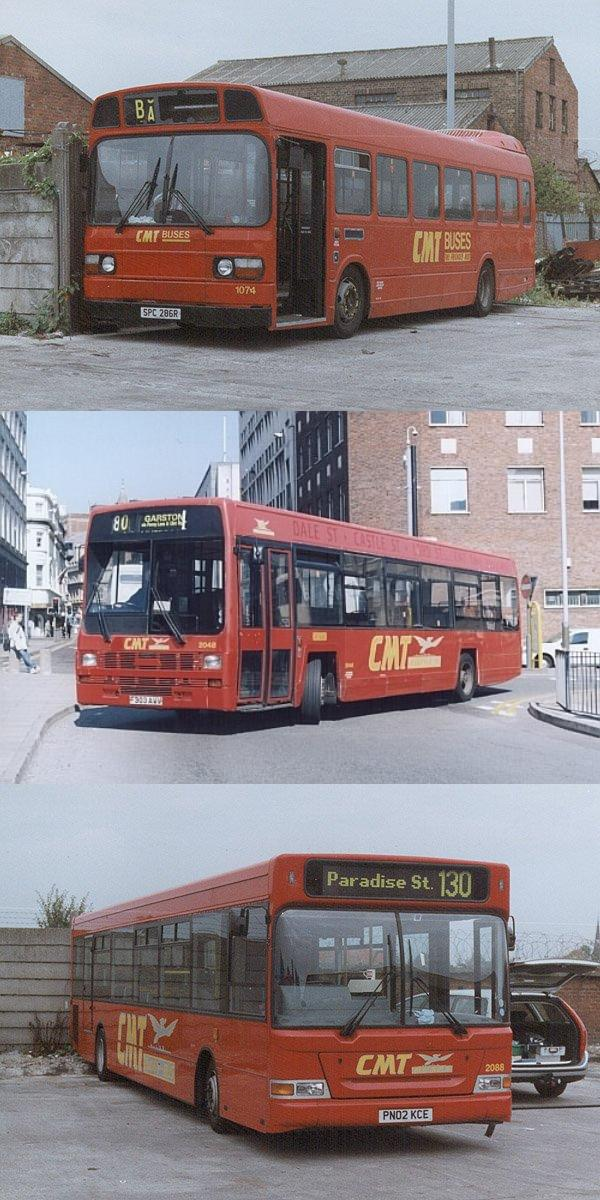
CMT Leyland National, Leyland Lynx and Plaxton Pointer 2 bodied Dennis Dart SLF

CMT Buses was a long established coach hire operator in the Merseyside area. After deregulation CMT, diversified into bus operation winning Merseytravel contracts and by the late-1980s had begun a commercial service network on the Wirral. Between 1991 and 1994 the company turned its focus to the Liverpool bus market which was already a hotbed of intense competition between Merseybus/MTL, City Fleet, Fareway, Liverline, Liverbus, Halton Transport, Merseyline, North Western, Village Group and GM Buses.

The coach hire and Wirral based services were discontinued and a significant number of new services on many of Liverpool's most lucrative bus corridors were started by CMT with a large fleet of Leyland Nationals. These were very successful and sparked a bus war in Liverpool which led to a period of consolidation in which MTL acquired Fareway, Liverbus and Village Group, North Western acquired Liverline, GM Buses withdrew from Merseyside and MTL, North Western, CMT Buses, GM Buses and Halton Transport entered into a controversial agreement which limited competition between these parties in the North West and fixed fares. A Competition Commission investigation which ruled this was illegal and fined the parties involved.

Despite this, CMT Buses was successful within the Merseyside bus market and from the summer of 1995 to the summer of 2002, it gradually began adding substantial numbers of new vehicles to its fleet including Wright Endurance bodied Volvo B10Bs, Wright Liberator bodied Volvo B10Ls, Wright Renown bodied Volvo B10BLEs and Northern Counties Paladin, Plaxton Pointer and Wright Crusader bodied Dennis Darts.

=== Expansion ===
In March 1999, CMT acquired Formby based independent ABC Travel, which operated a substantial number of contracts for Merseytravel services and a modern fleet of mainly Optare products including MetroRiders, Deltas, Excels and Solos. Merseytravel contractor L&M Transport/Greenbus, in which it was rumoured CMT Buses had an interest, was integrated into CMT around 2001 and the operations centred upon the CMT base in Aintree. On 15 June 2003, GTL acquired the operations and vehicles of CMT Buses, further consolidating GTL's position within the Merseyside bus market through maintaining an additional depot in Aintree and expanding the fleet to approximately 290 vehicles.

== Glenvale's expansion ==
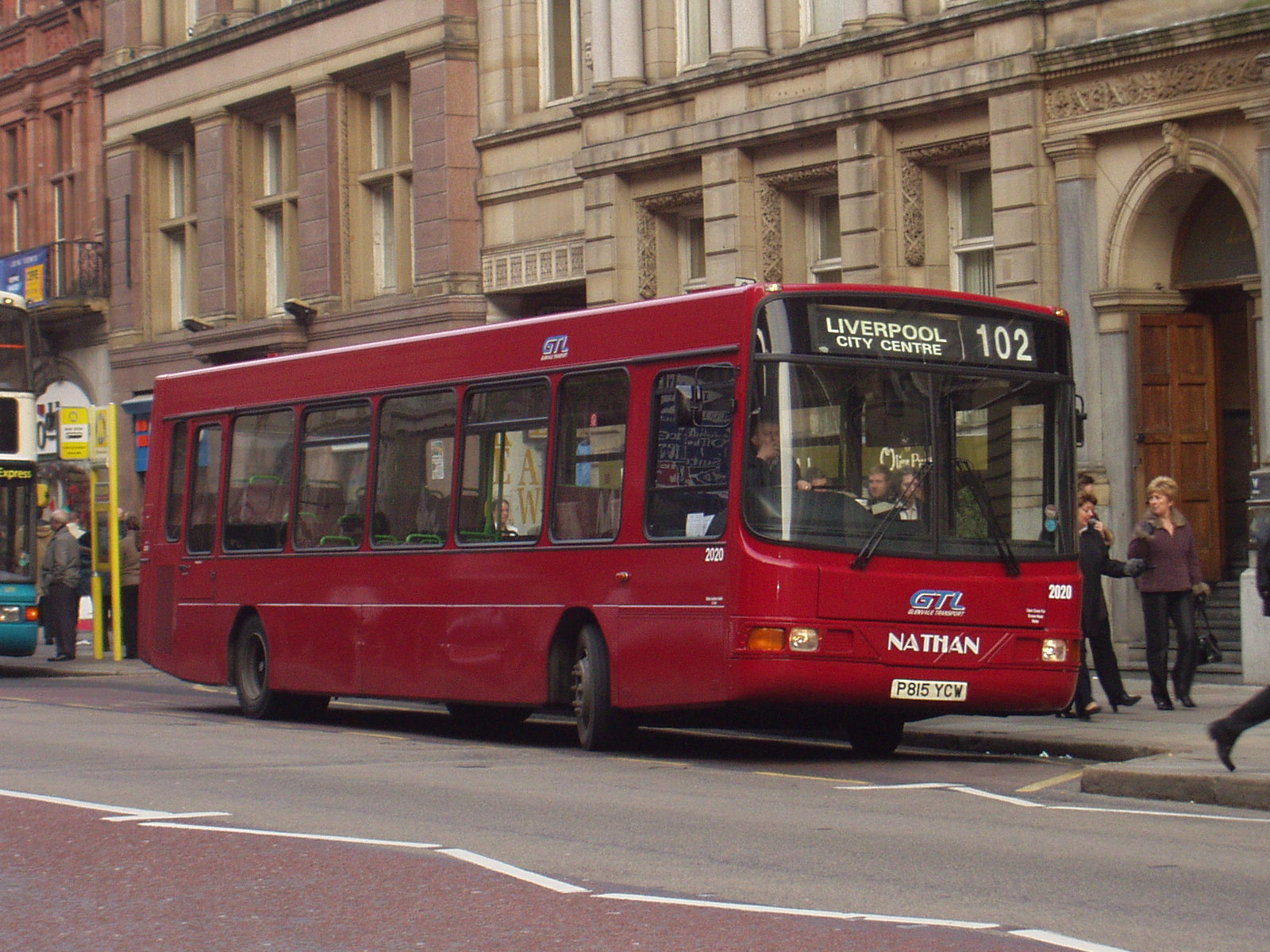
Wright Crusader bodied Dennis Dart SLF in Liverpool in 2008 in the darker all over red livery

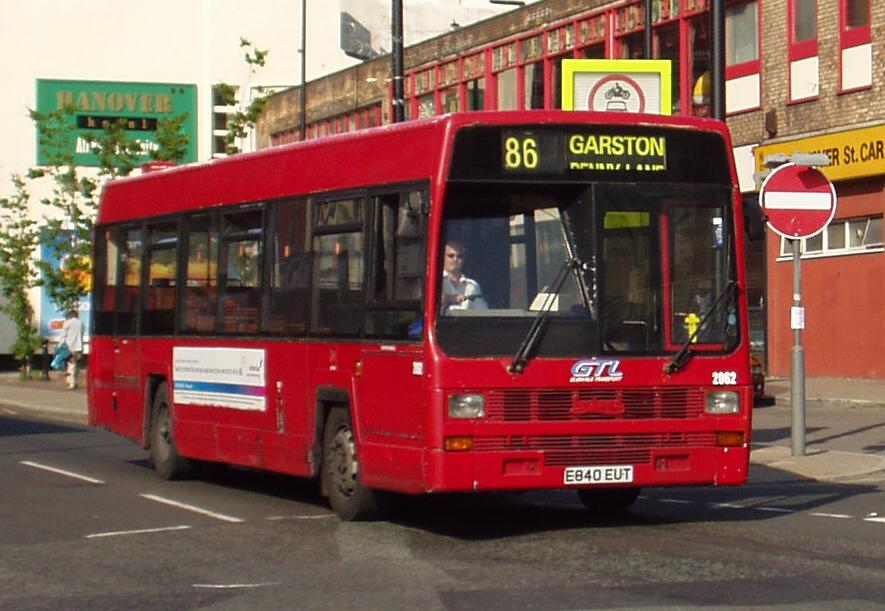
Leyland Lynx acquired from CMT Buses

The acquisition of CMT Buses enabled GTL to become Merseyside's second largest bus operator, giving it around 25% share of the Liverpool bus operating market. Initially GTL kept CMT Buses as a separate entity, maintaining their all over bright red livery and yellow CMT Buses/liver bird logos along with CMT's route network, some of which duplicated those of GTL.

In October 2003, however, management of the Aintree depot was transferred over to GTL's management team and service network rationalised to co-ordinate with those of GTL. New blue 'GTL' logos were applied to the CMT vehicles and GTL adopted a darker all-red livery to replace the ex-MTL cream/crimson livery. Around this time, GTL had been warned by Traffic Commissioner for North West England Beverley Bell for late running, with Bell claiming that up to 50% of GTL's bus services were running unacceptably later than timetabled.

By December 2003, Glenvale Transport controlled around a quarter of the Liverpool regional bus market, operating a fleet of 330 buses and employing 880 staff. GTL made £17 million (equivalent to £31,094,000 in 2025) in annual revenues.

=== Fleet investment ===
During the operator's existence, GTL never bought any new vehicles, despite promises on numerous occasions of significant reinvestment. At a public inquiry held in late 2003, Traffic Commissioner Bell chose not to cut GTL's operating license at a public enquiry and instead strongly recommended that GTL buy new buses, after two separate inspections by the Vehicle and Operator Services Agency resulted in 29 GTL buses being prohibited from running in service.

From late 2003 until spring 2005, seventy elderly double-decker buses were replaced in a like-for-like basis by used mid-life Alexander Dash bodied Dennis Darts and Volvo B6 single-deck buses that had been purchased from the Stagecoach Group and Ensignbus, along with smaller batches of Wright Handybus bodied Dennis Darts from Go North East and Northern Counties Paladin bodied Dennis Darts from Metroline. However, these vehicles were 9–12 years old and not the new vehicles GTL had promised.

=== Arriva and Merseytram competition ===
By autumn 2004, the Competition Commission ban on Arriva competing against GTL in Kirkby and North Liverpool had expired. In response to significant expansion by GTL throughout Merseyside, Arriva registered high frequency copycat services over much of the GTL network in Kirkby and North Liverpool including 2 (Kirkby Northwood-Liverpool), 14A/B (Kirkby Tower Hill-Liverpool), 17 (Fazakerley Hospital-Liverpool), 19 (Fazakerley Lower Lane-Liverpool), 20 (Skelmersdale-Kirkby-Liverpool). These services mostly used modern low-floor vehicles and gave Arriva a competitive advantage over GTL's ageing fleet.

Dominic Brady, chief executive of Glenvale Transport, saw the proposed Merseytram expansion plans as a threat to his company's business model. He believed the tram expansion was unneeded as his buses already served the market alongside the proposed tram route well. Brady warned that, if the tram was built, Glenvale would be forced to cut 250 jobs and dispose of 130 buses. In the end, the proposed tram line was not built before Glenvale's demise in 2005.

=== Demise ===
Despite GTL's core routes in Kirkby and North Liverpool being considered as lucrative, profitable bus territory, GTL had an annual turnover of approximately £25 million (equivalent to £44,211,000 in 2025). Furthermore, levels of car ownership were relatively low, with significant declines in patronage.

By March 2005, GTL had run up debts of approximately £7 million (equivalent to £12,379,000 in 2025) and was rumoured to be struggling to meet its financial commitments; during June 2005, GTL's drivers threatened to take strike action after they had not been paid for eleven days due to what was claimed to be a 'banking error'. GTL was therefore put on the market, with bidders for the company including the Go-Ahead Group, Keolis, the National Express Group, the Stagecoach Group and Transdev.

On 13 July 2005, GTL was purchased by the Stagecoach Group for £3.2 million (equivalent to £5,659,000 in 2025), with Stagecoach additionally taking on GTL's debts of £7.8 million (equivalent to £13,794,000 in 2025). The company was rebranded to Stagecoach Merseyside, and shortly after the purchase, Stagecoach implemented a fleet renewal programme that replaced a majority of the former GTL fleet with up to 75 new Plaxton Pointer 2 bodied Dennis Dart SLF low-floor buses worth £3.9 million (equivalent to £6,897,000 in 2025), as well as older Volvo B10Ms and Leyland Olympians cascaded in from across the Stagecoach Group.

== Incidents ==
- On 31 December 2003, Scott Allen, who worked for Widnes recovery company Hough Green Garage Ltd, was killed while attempting to recover a broken down Glenvale Transport Volvo B10B single-deck bus. The air suspension of the Volvo bus failed as Allen was working underneath the bus, crushing Allen, who later died of his injuries upon arrival at the Royal Liverpool Hospital. Although Glenvale Transport was not to blame for the incident, Hough Green Garage Ltd was found guilty on two charges under the Health and Safety at Work etc. Act 1974 and was fined £96,000, additionally being ordered to pay £20,000 in legal costs; managing director David Nigel Farrell was also found guilty under the act and was fined £14,000.
- On 4 March 2005, 16-year-old teenager Lee Harrickie was killed when his bicycle collided with a Glenvale Transport single-deck bus travelling along Roughwood Drive in Kirkby. Harrickie, who at the time was cycling with a group of friends, was taken by paramedics to Aintree University Hospital but later died due to complications from multiple head injuries while undergoing emergency surgery. Glenvale Transport driver Terrance McCormick was later found by the Liverpool Coroner's Court to not be at fault for the death of Harrickie, as Harrickie did not look behind him before cycling in front of McCormick's bus, which was about to overtake him.
