= Alexander Ultra =

Low-floor bus body on Volvo B10L chassis

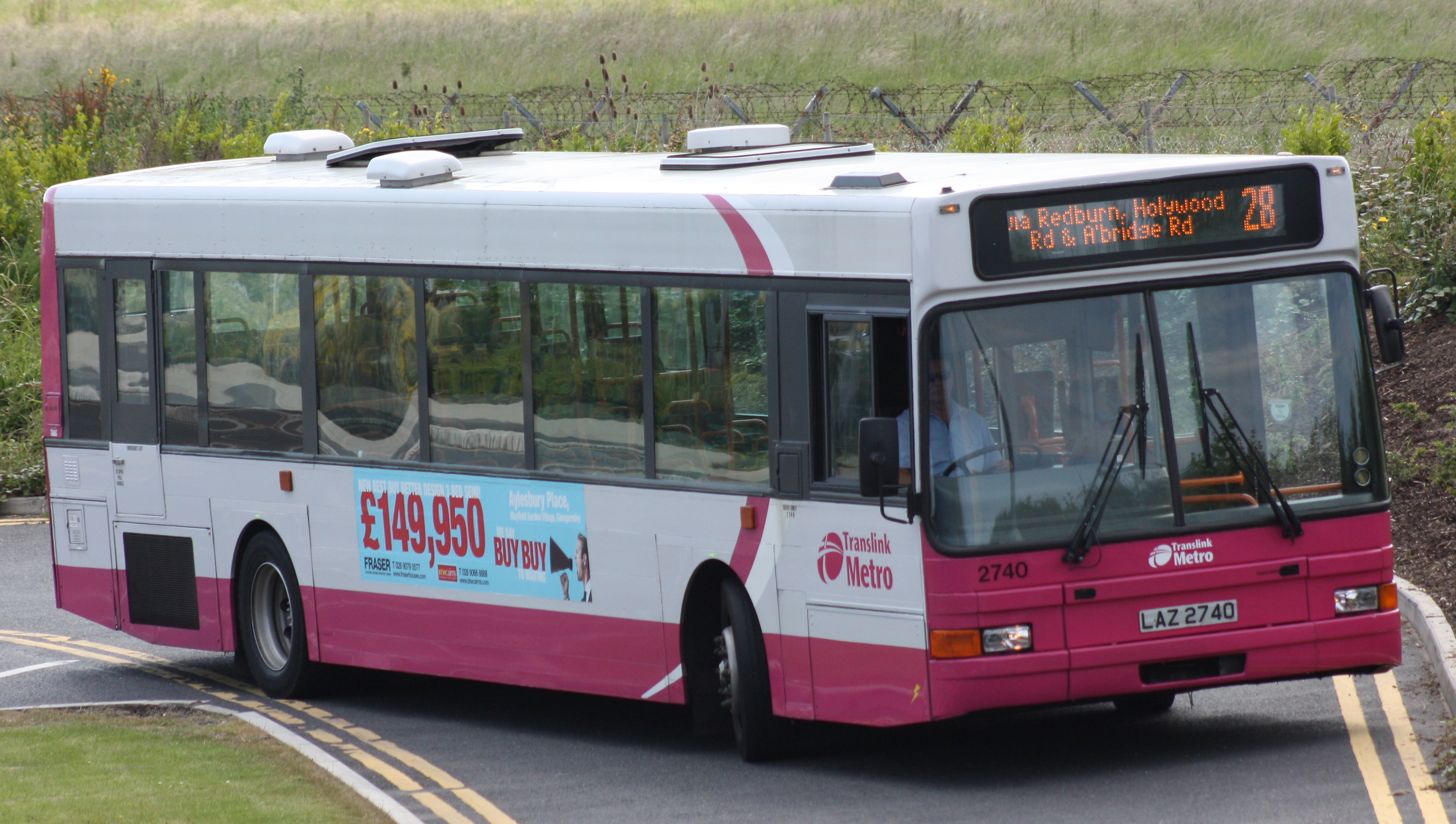
- Translink Metro Alexander Ultra bodied Volvo B10L in Belfast, June 2010

Overview
- Manufacturer: Walter Alexander (Belfast)
- Production: 1994–1998
- Assembly: Mallusk, County Antrim, Northern Ireland
- Designer: Säffle Karosserifabrik AB

Body and chassis
- Doors: 1 or 2 doors
- Floor type: Low floor
- Chassis: Volvo B10L
- Related: Volvo 5000

Powertrain
- Engine: Volvo THD103
- Capacity: 40–44 seated, 25–29 standing
- Transmission: Voith or ZF

Dimensions
- Length: 12,000 mm (472.4 in)
- Kerb weight: 10,980 kg (24,207 lb)

Chronology
- Successor: Alexander ALX300

The Alexander Ultra was a low floor single-deck bus body built on the Volvo B10L chassis by Walter Alexander (Belfast) from 1995 to 1998. It was the right-hand drive equivalent of the Volvo 5000 and was built on license from Volvo Buses.

== Development ==
Developed in conjunction with Volvo Buses, the Alexander Ultra was developed on the B10L chassis with the aim to be the first low-floor Volvo bus to be sold in the United Kingdom. Alexander employed the use of Volvo subsidiary Säffle's 'System 2000' frame, using a combination of aluminium and extrusions secured with positively bolted joints. The Säffle frame differs from other Alexander products of the time, such as the Alexander PS type, with the low-floor B10L chassis requiring the body of the bus to be an integral part of the vehicle, in contrast to older chassis supporting body-on-frame construction.

Internally, the Ultra had a 950 mm (37.4 in) gangway between the front wheels and a flat floor throughout most of the bus, with seats in the passenger compartment suspended from the ceiling via the grab handles. Double-glazed windows were also offered.

Four pre-production demonstrators were produced, the first of which was bodied by Säffle and delivered to Mainline Buses in April 1994. Subsequent Ultras were built on license to Alexander at their Mallusk plant in County Antrim, Northern Ireland.

== Operators ==
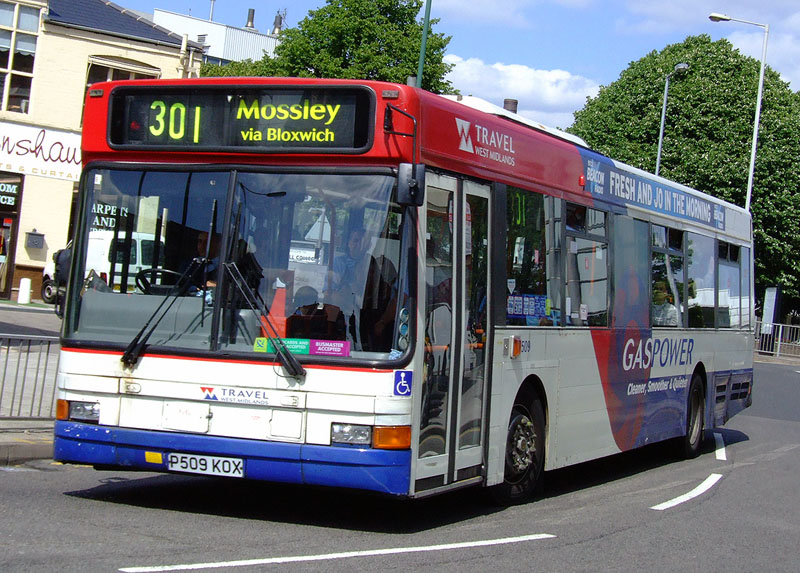
A Travel West Midlands CNG-powered Ultra in Walsall, June 2006

The Alexander Ultra ultimately did not sell well, however it received significant orders from a handful of operators in the UK and Ireland. The biggest customer of the Ultra were the Northern Ireland Transport Holding Company, who in what was the UK's biggest low floor bus order at the time, ordered 60 Ultras in July 1995, 50 of which were delivered to Citybus and the remaining 10 delivered to Ulsterbus for services in Derry. Two pre-production demonstrator examples were also acquired.

Travel West Midlands was the second biggest customer for the Ultra, taking delivery of 14 of the type in 1997 for use on route 529 serving Walsall and Wolverhampton via Willenhall. These Ultras were fuelled by compressed natural gas in a partnership supported by the Energy Saving Trust between TWM, Volvo Bus and British Gas, who constructed CNG refuelling points at TWM's Walsall garage for the buses.

The other operators of the Alexander Ultra were First Northampton, who took delivery of nine Ultras, six of which were CNG-powered, Timeline of Wigan, who purchased 6 Ultras with grant funding from Greater Manchester PTE, and Dublin Bus, who took delivery of five diesel Ultras as well as one dual-door CNG Ultra, the latter of which was quickly disposed of by the operator.

Production of the Ultra ceased in 1998, with Alexander moving on to develop the Alexander ALX300 body, which was available on the Volvo B10BLE chassis.

== See also ==
- Wright Liberator, a competitor to the Ultra developed by Wrightbus on the B10L chassis with an Alusuisse frame
