= Walter Alexander (Belfast) =

Northern Irish bus manufacturer

Walter Alexander (Belfast) Ltd
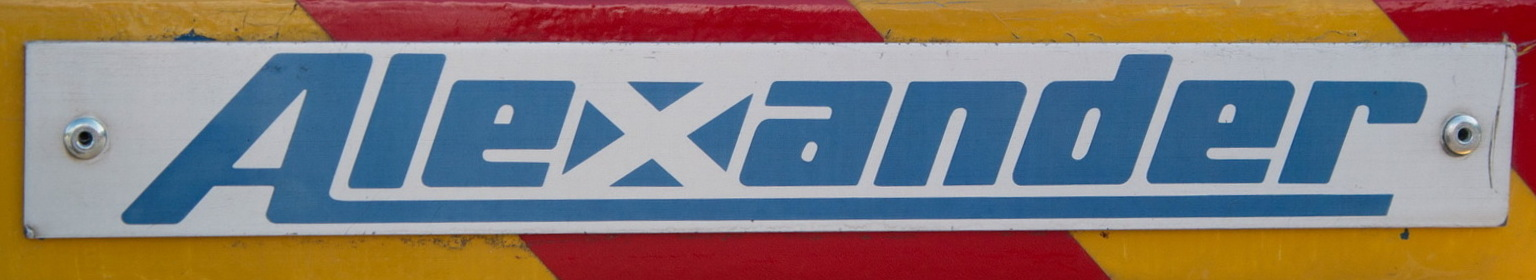
- Type: Subsidiary
- Industry: Bus manufacturing Fire engine bodywork
- Predecessor: Potters of Belfast
- Founded: May 1969; 57 years ago
- Defunct: May 2004
- Fate: Factory closed amid TransBus bankruptcy rescue
- Headquarters: Mallusk, County Antrim, Northern Ireland
- Owner: Mayflower Corporation (1996-2004)
- Number of employees: 260 (1996)
- Parent: Walter Alexander Coachbuilders

Walter Alexander (Belfast) Ltd was a subsidiary of Falkirk based bus and coach manufacturer Walter Alexander Coachbuilders which produced bus, coach and fire engine bodies mainly for Irish operating markets in Mallusk, County Antrim in Northern Ireland between 1969 and 2004.

== History ==
Walter Alexander (Belfast) was formed in May 1969 with Walter Alexander's takeover of coachbuilder Potters of Belfast, based at a factory on Alexandra Park Avenue in Dunmore and formerly known as MH Coachworks Ltd. Among first orders for the new company included the manufacture of 50 double decker bus bodies on Daimler Fleetline chassis for Belfast Corporation Transport, and 260 single-deck bus bodies on Leyland Leopard chassis as well as 40 double decker bodies on Leyland Atlantean chassis for the newly-formed Ulsterbus. The company moved to Mallusk, on the outskirts of Belfast, in 1972 following two bomb attacks on 25 March that destroyed the Dunmore factory.

Double-decker bus production returned to Mallusk in 1990 with an order for 63 Alexander RH bodied Leyland Olympians for Dublin Bus. The first new double-deckers to enter service in Northern Ireland since 1975, 20 low-floor Alexander ALX400s on Volvo B7TL chassis, were also manufactured by Alexander (Belfast) for delivery to Translink in 2001.

In 1995, parent company Walter Alexander was sold to the Mayflower Corporation. Following the purchase, significant restructuring of the company and declining orders and profitability saw Mayflower propose to close Alexander (Belfast) in 1997, with up to 230 jobs set to be lost at the Mallusk factory. The factory's closure was averted following negotiations between Mayflower and Alexander (Belfast)'s suppliers and customers, with 50 jobs still lost, however all manufacturing at Mallusk, except for the Ultra low-floor bus, was later transferred to Falkirk as Walter Alexander (Belfast) was restructured by Mayflower to be an assembly-only operation taking knock-down kits from Falkirk.

In 2000, Walter Alexander Coachbuilders and Guildford chassis manufacturer Dennis Specialist Vehicles, the latter of which had recently been purchased by Mayflower, merged with Scarborough bus body manufacturer and Henlys Group company Plaxton to form the TransBus International joint venture. However, TransBus entered administration in July 2004 after the Mayflower Corporation collapsed with £196 million (equivalent to £353,741,000 in 2025) in unpaid debts. Though TransBus International was successfully purchased by a consortium of buyers and restructured into Alexander Dennis, the Mallusk factory was not included in the sale and was closed with the loss of over 90 jobs.

== Products ==
=== Buses ===
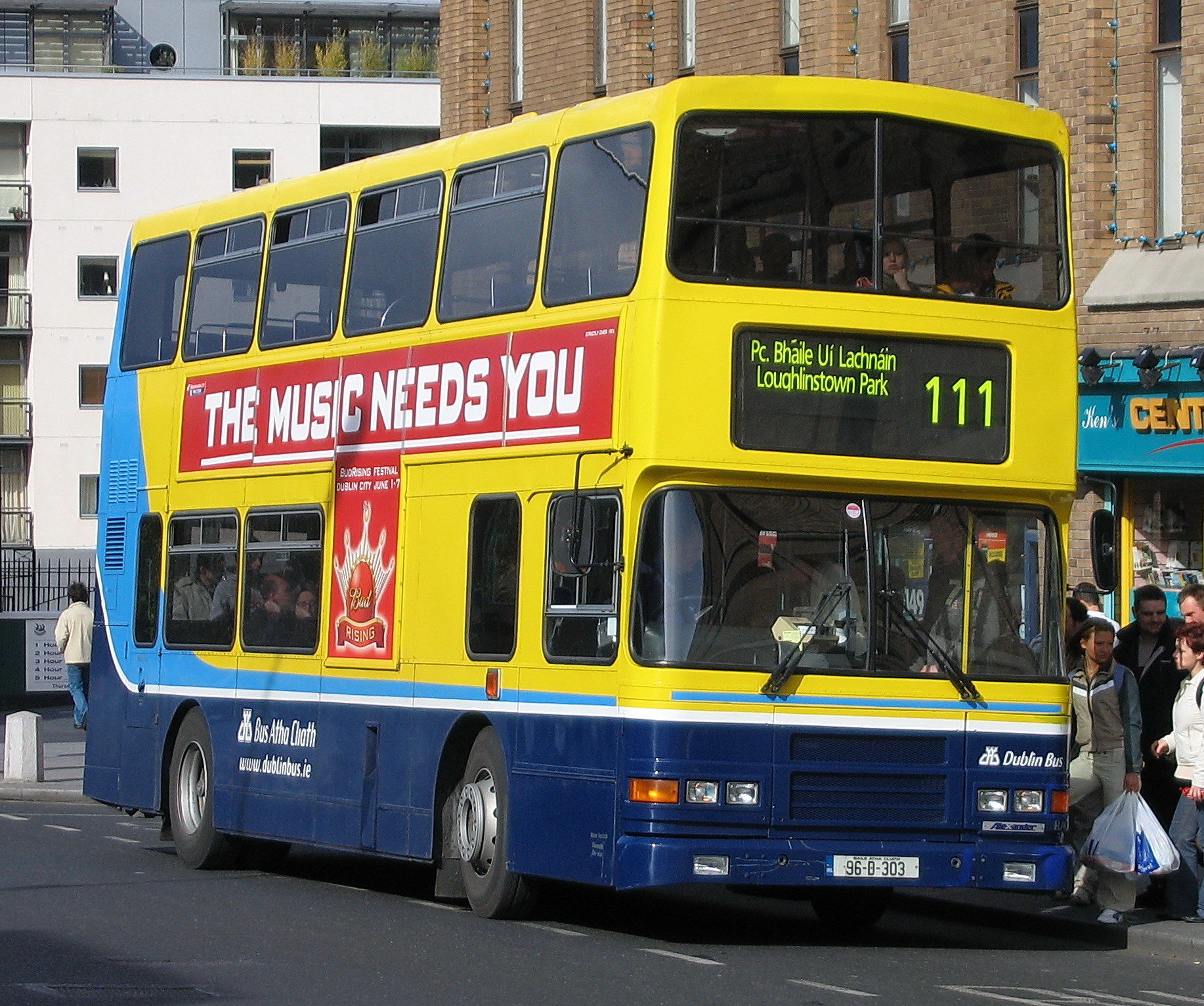
Dublin Bus Alexander (Belfast) RH bodied Volvo Olympian in Dún Laoghaire in May 2005

The main business of Alexander (Belfast) was the assembly of single-deck bus bodies on various chassis, most of which were delivered to Ulsterbus and Citybus, both of which were part of the Northern Ireland Transport Holding Company (later rebranded Translink).

Alexander (Belfast) also assembled some conventional Walter Alexander bodies, such as the Y-Type, when the Falkirk factory was at overcapacity, and built their own minibus bodies on van chassis such as the Iveco TurboDaily and various Mercedes-Benz chassis, most of which were delivered as school buses for the five Education and Library Boards of Northern Ireland; a large demand for Mercedes-Benz minibus bodies following bus deregulation in Great Britain saw Walter Alexander transfer minibus body production from Falkirk to Alexander (Belfast) during 1992, with first orders for these minibuses taken by major mainland British bus operator Stagecoach Holdings.

Double-decker bus production returned to Mallusk in 1990 when Alexander (Belfast) was contracted to assemble 63 Alexander RH bodies on Leyland Olympian chassis for Dublin Bus. Alexander (Belfast) continued to produce RH double-decker bodies for Dublin Bus' entire run of 640 Leyland and Volvo Olympians between 1990 and 1999, differing from their mainland counterparts with a restyled facia incorporating an enlarged front grille and four headlights as opposeed to the standard two.

==== X-Type ====
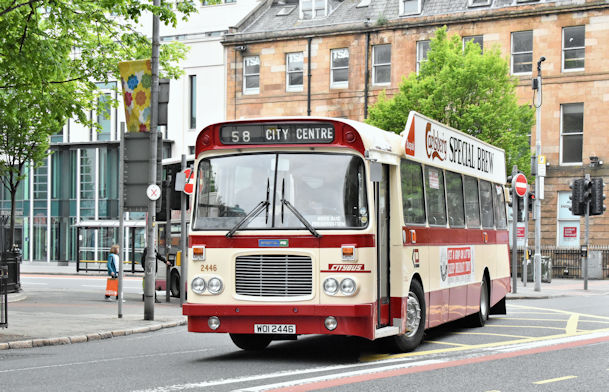
Preserved Citybus Alexander (Belfast) bodied Bristol RELL in Donegall Square in Belfast in May 2016

Referred to unofficially as the 'X-Type', Alexander (Belfast) produced single-deck bodies on both the Bristol RELL and Leyland Leopard chassis for Ulsterbus and Citybus. Early models were an adaptation of a previous Potters design for Ulsterbus, however Bristol RELLs delivered to Ulsterbus between 1975 and 1976 introduced a new body design, capable of a capacity of 74 passengers and featuring a forced-air ventilation system distributing fresh air, flowing from a front grille, through the passenger area via openable vents above each window.

Ulsterbus were the main purchasers of the 'X-Type', and eventually took both the last Bristol RELLs and Leyland Leopards to be built by both manufacturers, as well as the rarer export-oriented Leyland B21 chassis, which used both Leyland and Bristol running gear. These buses were often hijacked and destroyed in unrest during The Troubles, and as a result, adaptations were gradually made to the design: interiors were left mostly unpainted to restrict the spread of fire in the passenger area, strengthened front and rear bumpers with twin tow eyes for quicker vehicle recovery, toughened glass windows and occasional rebodies of destroyed buses when the chassis was salvageable. The final Bristol RELLs were withdrawn by Citybus in January 2004, while the final Leyland Leopards were withdrawn by Ulsterbus in 2006.

==== N-Type ====
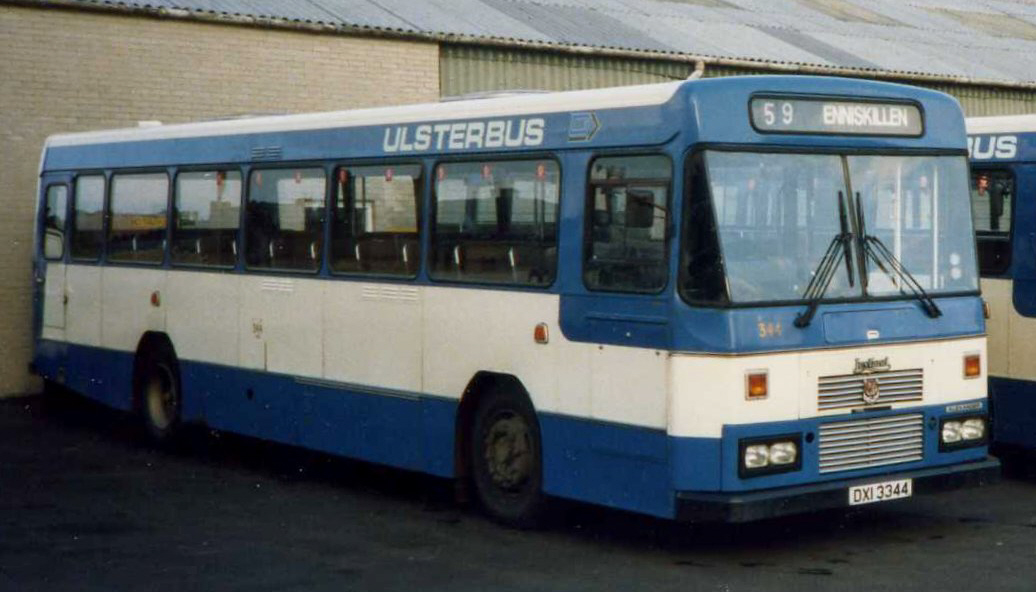
Ulsterbus Alexander N-Type bodied Leyland Tiger at Enniskillen bus garage in June 1990

In 1984, Alexander (Belfast) began producing the N-Type body on Leyland Tiger chassis for Ulsterbus as a successor to the 'X-Type', able to be specified as either a luxury coach or dual-purpose bus. The N-Type, constructed with aluminium alloy and composite framework and riveted together using 'Avdelok' rivets, was a more angular and aerodynamic body compared to its predecessor, developed in cooperation with Ulster Polytechnic to improve fuel consumption and reduce road spray, and had interchangeable windows with its predecessor for ease of repairs. A small number of N-Type bodies were also produced on Leyland Lynx chassis as Ulsterbus and Citybus explored alternatives to the discontinued Bristol RELL.

With the new body and chassis combination seeing major success in its home market, Alexander (Belfast) began to offer the body for operators outside of Northern Ireland, with Mecca Leisure Group subsidiary Shearings taking delivery of 40 Alexander N-Types bodied Leyland Tigers between 1989 and 1990 for its public bus operations in Greater Manchester and Staffordshire. Four were also assembled on Leyland B21 chassis for Ipswich Borough Transport in 1985.

The N-Type body was also adapted for use on Dodge 50 and Ford R 1115 minibus chassis, as well as the later Dennis Javelin coach chassis, exclusively for Education and Library Board school bus use.

==== Q-Type ====
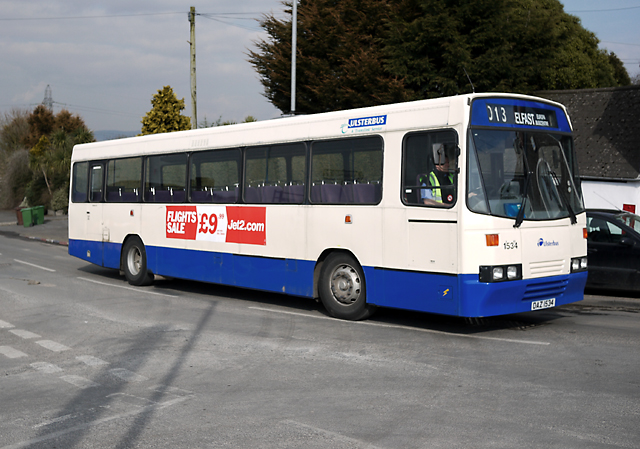
Translink Ulsterbus Alexander Q-Type bodied Volvo B10M in Drumbo, County Down in March 2010

The N-Type body was eventually replaced by the Q-Type in 1990, and was made available on both the Leyland Tiger and Volvo B10M chassis. Designed by Dawson Sellar Design with the intention to be 'aesthetically pleasing', it is a redesign of the N-Type with a deeper single-curvature windscreen, which could be specified as a one or two-piece windscreen, a revised front fascia including rounder glass fibre bumpers, deeper side windows secured by rubber gaskets, a 'kneeling' function which lowers the suspension to aid accessibility, and a redesigned interior featuring brightly painted handrails and a raised roofline.

As with previous bodies, the Q-Type was most popular with Ulsterbus and Citybus on both Leyland Tiger and Volvo B10M chassis. The last Leyland Tiger produced was delivered to Ulsterbus with an Alexander Q-Type body in September 1993, ending a long-running association with Leyland Motors that saw 600 Tigers enter service with Ulsterbus and Citybus. Immediately following the end of Leyland Tiger production, Alexander (Belfast) began assembling the first 50 Q-Type bodies on the Volvo B10M chassis for Ulsterbus and Citybus.

Outside of Northern Ireland, the Q-Type was marketed for export to mainland British operators, with plans to add a parallel Q-Type production line at Walter Alexander's Falkirk factory if demand for the body proved high enough. Two were delivered to United Automobile Services on Leyland Tiger chassis in 1990, with four on Leyland Tiger chassis also delivered to Lowland Scottish in October 1991, while Shearings' bus operations took delivery of 16 on Volvo B10M chassis in early 1991, these being the first Alexander Q-Type bodied B10Ms produced. A modified Q-Type body was fitted to an imported Iveco TurboCity chassis for demonstration, featuring the standard TurboCity front fascia as opposed to the Q-Type fascia, however no orders resulted for this variant.

==== Setanta ====
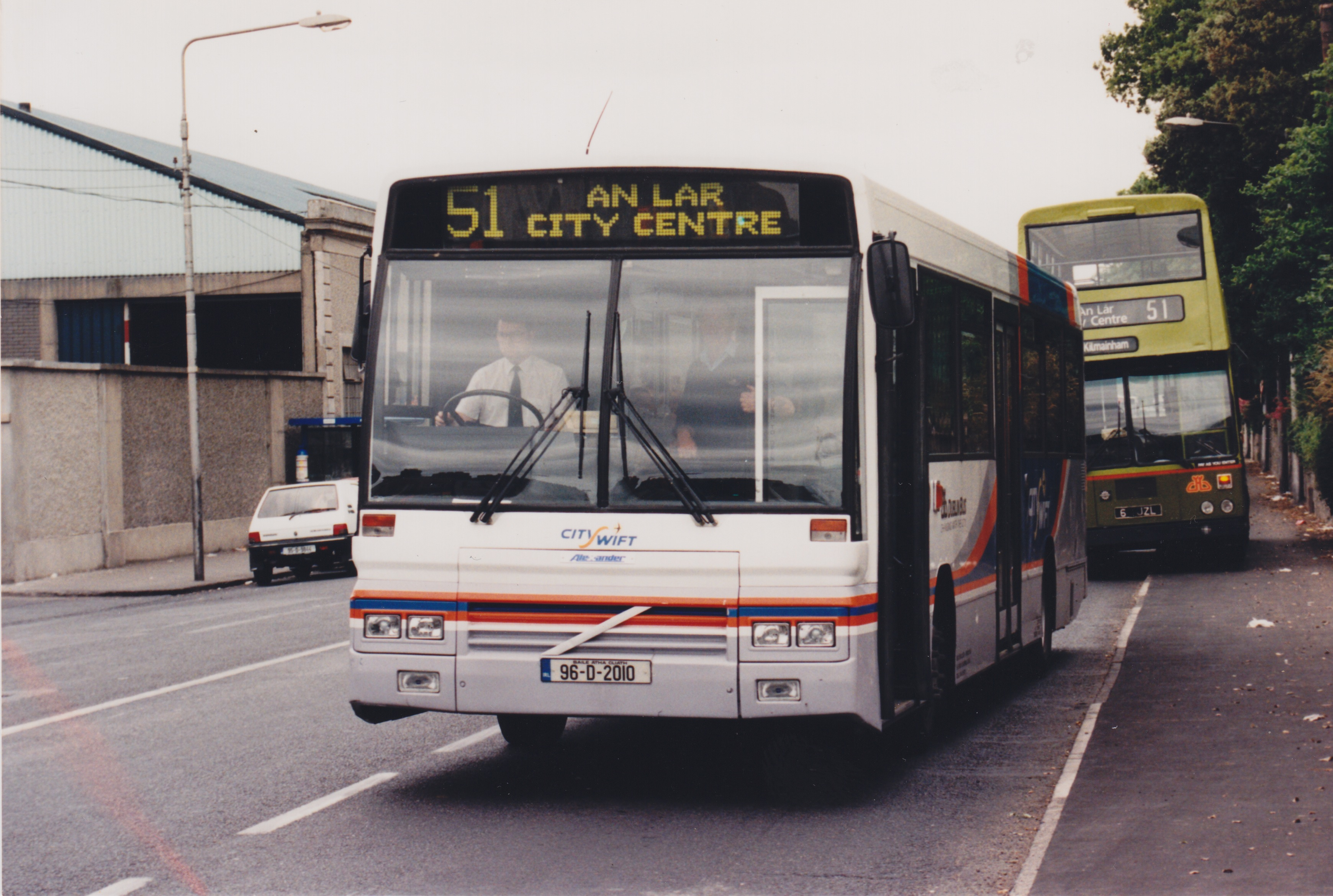
Dublin Bus Alexander Setanta bodied Volvo B10B in May 1996

Alexander (Belfast) produced the Setanta single-deck bus body on DAF SB220 and Volvo B10B chassis for the Irish urban bus operating market between 1993 and 1997. Built to Dublin Bus specification, the Setanta featured a sloped gangway towards the rear seats, stainless steel handrails as opposed to painted handrails, a luggage rack and a two-piece single-curvature windscreen. Following the reception of major orders from Dublin Bus and the state-owned Bus Éireann during the design process, Alexander named the body 'Setanta', the birth name of the Irish mythological figure Cú Chulainn, on suggestion of a member of staff to help market the body for potential customers.

The first ten production Setantas were delivered to Bus Éireann in 1993 for Cork city bus services, with eighty later delivered to Dublin Bus between 1993 and 1995, with all but ten being built on DAF SB220 chassis; the remaining ten were built on Volvo B10B chassis. Alexander (Belfast) also achieved an export order for the delivery of 50 Setantas on DAF SB220 chassis to Trans-Island Bus Services (TIBS) of Singapore between 1995 and 1997.

==== Ultra ====
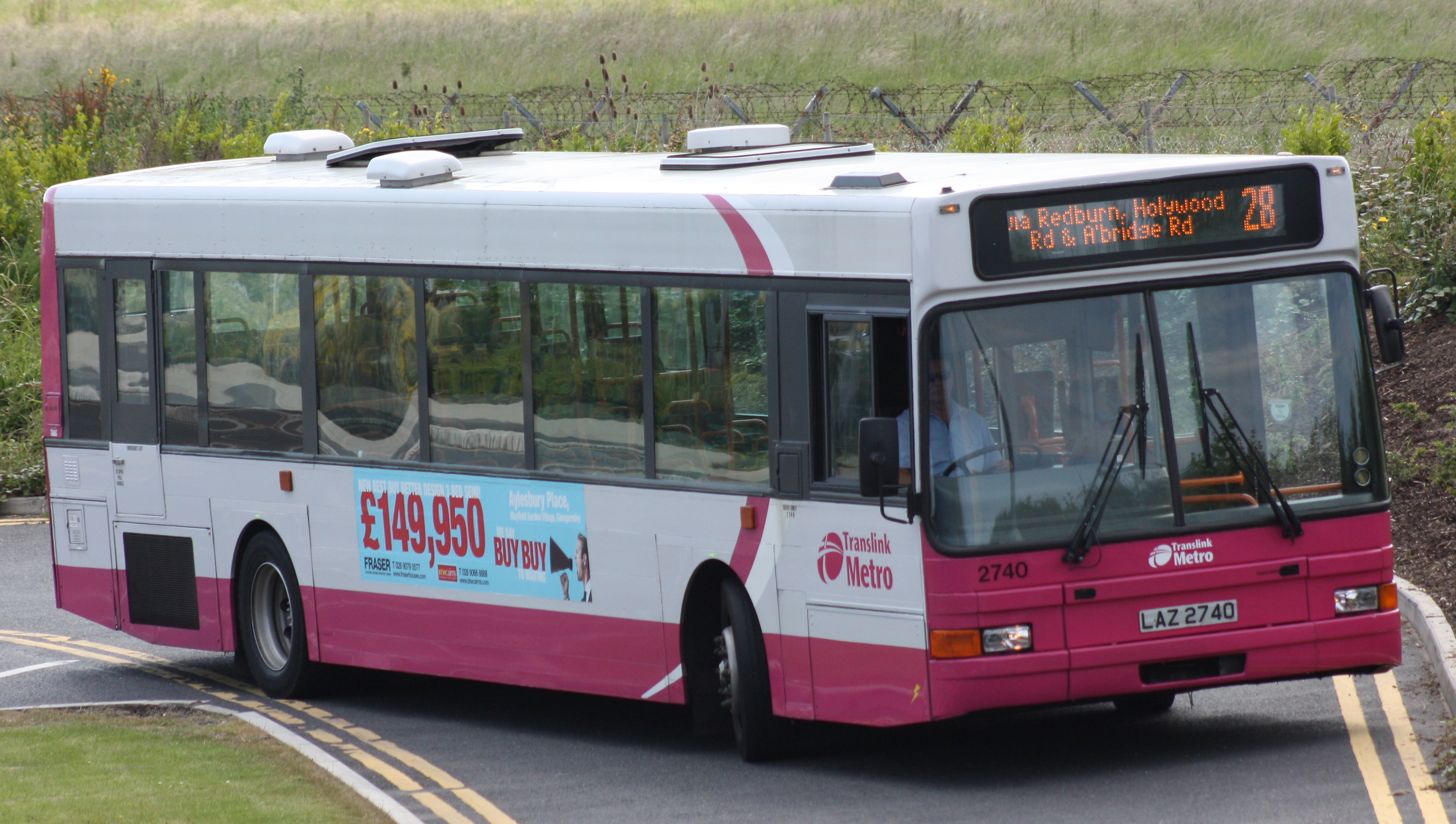
Translink Metro Alexander Ultra bodied Volvo B10L in June 2010

The Alexander Ultra was a low floor single-deck bus body built by Alexander (Belfast) on license from Volvo Buses on Volvo B10L chassis from 1995 to 1998. The right-hand drive equivalent of the Volvo 5000, the Ultra was developed with the aim to be the first low-floor Volvo bus to be sold in the United Kingdom and was assembled with Säffle's aluminium 'System 2000' frame; this body differed from other Alexander (Belfast) products as the low-floor B10L chassis required the body of the bus to be an integral part of the vehicle, in contrast to older chassis supporting body-on-frame construction.

The first and largest operator of these were Ulsterbus and Citybus, however further examples, some powered by compressed natural gas, were delivered to Travel West Midlands, First Northampton, Timeline of Wigan and Dublin Bus.

=== Fire engines ===
As well as bus bodies, Alexander (Belfast) also manufactured bodies for fire engines operated by the Northern Ireland Fire and Rescue Service and its predecessors, as well as some fire services in Scotland. Bodies were assembled on Volvo FL and Volvo FS7 light truck chassis, as well as for the purpose-built Dennis SS series fire engine chassis.

== See also ==
- Wrightbus, major bus manufacturer based in Ballymena, County Antrim
- GAC Ireland, former manufacturer of CIÉ and Dublin Bus buses based in Shannon, County Clare
