= Xplore Dundee =

Bus operator in Dundee, Scotland

Tayside Public Transport Company Ltd.
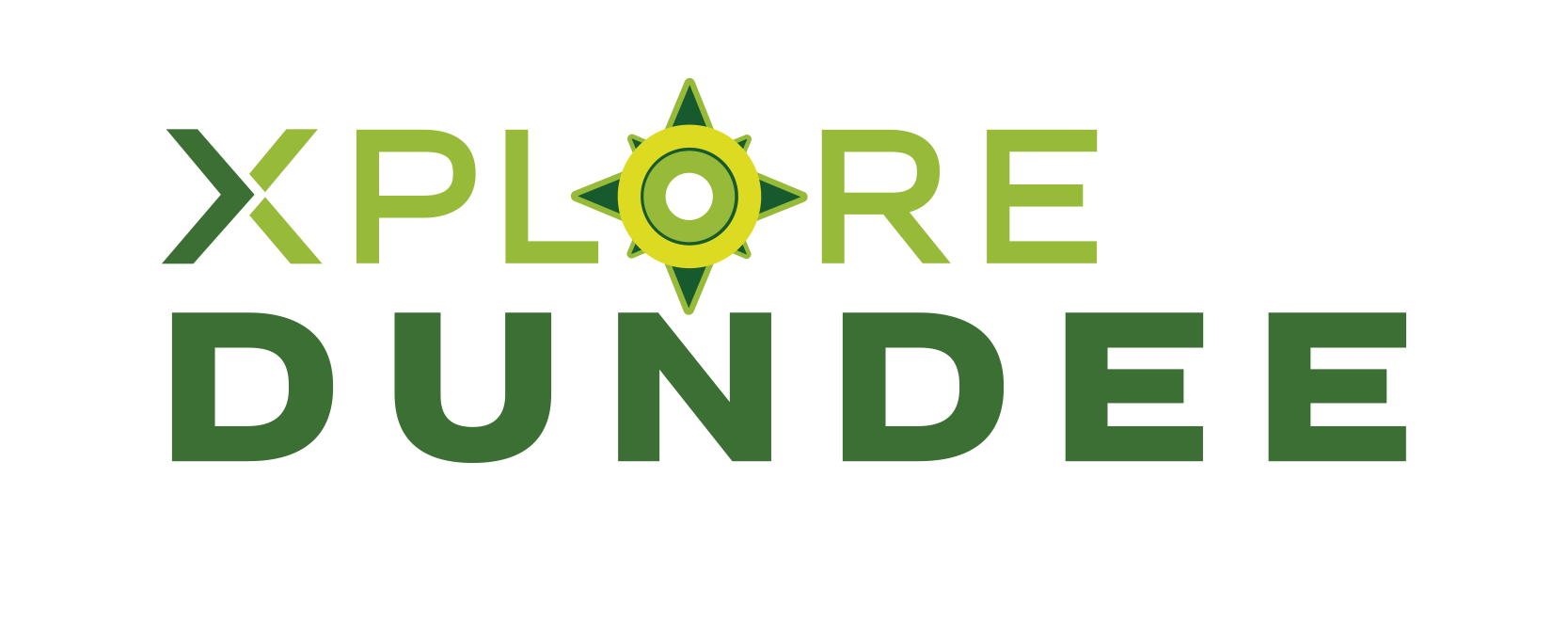

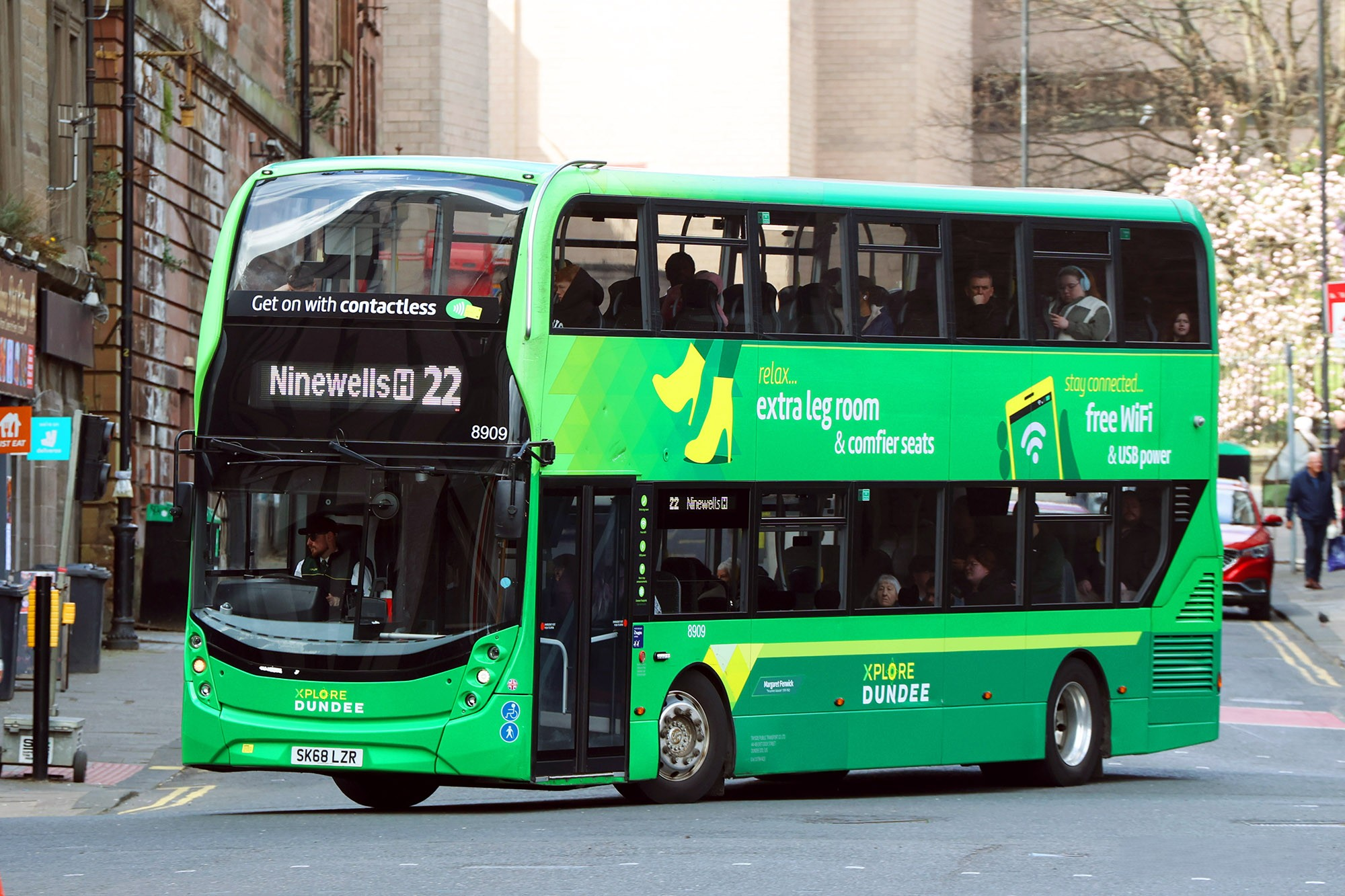
- Alexander Dennis Enviro400 MMC at Dundee in April 2025
- Parent: McGill's Group
- Founded: 1985
- Headquarters: Dundee, Scotland, UK
- Service area: Dundee City
- Service type: Bus and Coach services
- Routes: 24 (April 2026)
- Fleet: 88 (April 2026)
- Chief executive: Ralph Roberts
- Website: www.xploredundee.com

Xplore Dundee (legally Tayside Public Transport Company Ltd.), is a bus operator based in Dundee, Scotland, operating services mainly within the city. It is a subsidiary of the McGill's Group.

== History ==
The company has its origins in the Dundee and District Tramways Company, which commenced horse tram operations on 30 August 1877. Steam traction was adopted in 1885. On 1 June 1899, the company was compulsorily acquired by the local municipality to become Dundee City Tramways, which was electrified between 1900 and 1902. From 1922, motor buses began to be operated in addition to the trams. The tram system continued to be extended until 1933, however by 1956, the trams had been fully replaced by buses and the company renamed Dundee Corporation Transport.

Local government reorganisation meant that the bus operation passed to Tayside Regional Council in May 1975. In spite of the change of name, the council's bus operations were confined to the Dundee area. The livery was changed from green to dark blue, light blue and white.

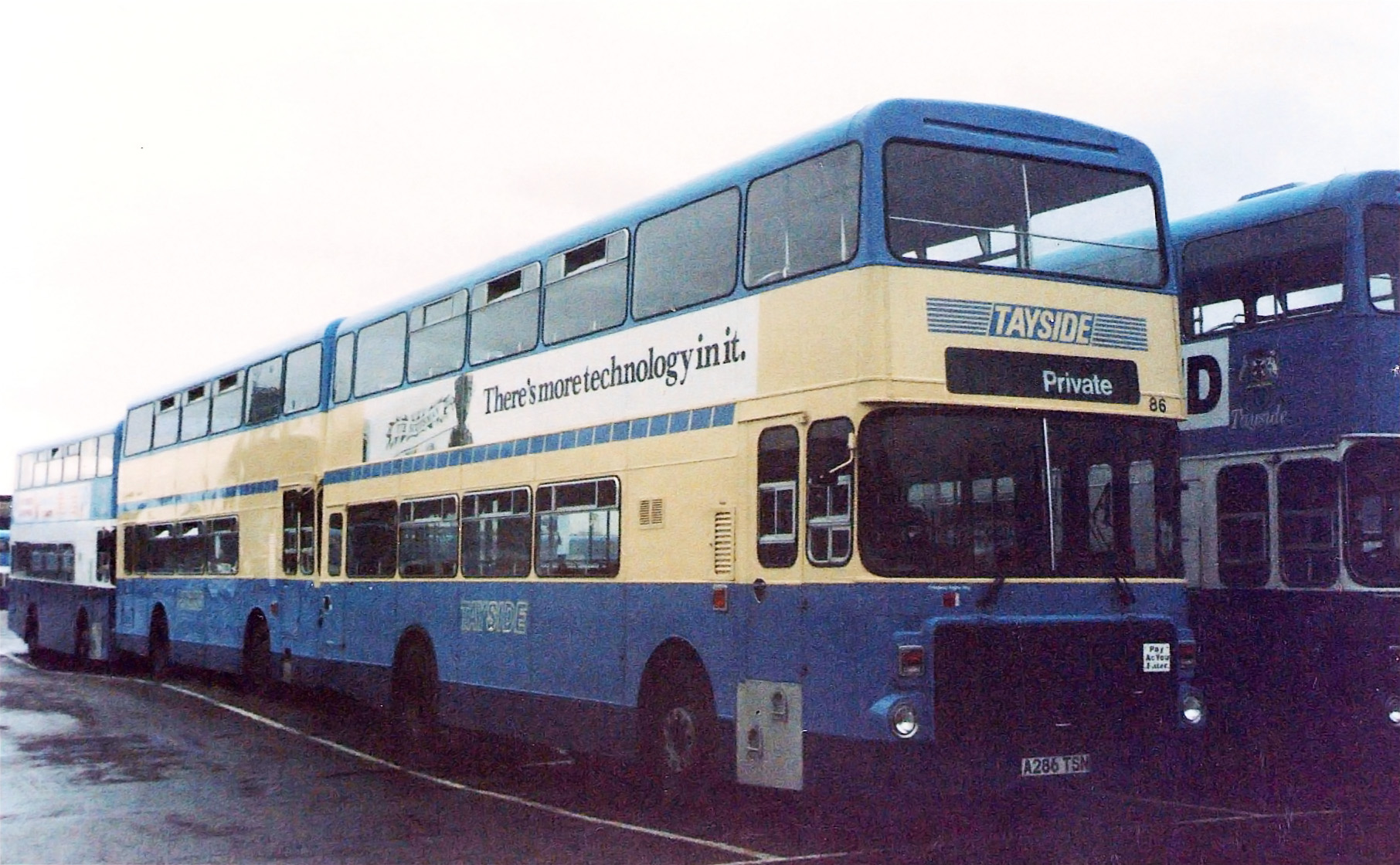
Tayside Regional Council Alexander bodied Volvo Ailsa B55 in 1986 showing the newer livery and, to its right, another "Tayside" bus in the previous livery

In preparation for bus deregulation in October 1986, Tayside was restructured into a separate legal entity, Tayside Bus Company Limited. In 1990, the company acquired the operations of Greyhound Luxury Coaches and rebranded it as Tayside Greyhound, operating it as the company's private coach and bus hire arm. Tayside Public Transport was eventually sold in an employee buyout in June 1991.

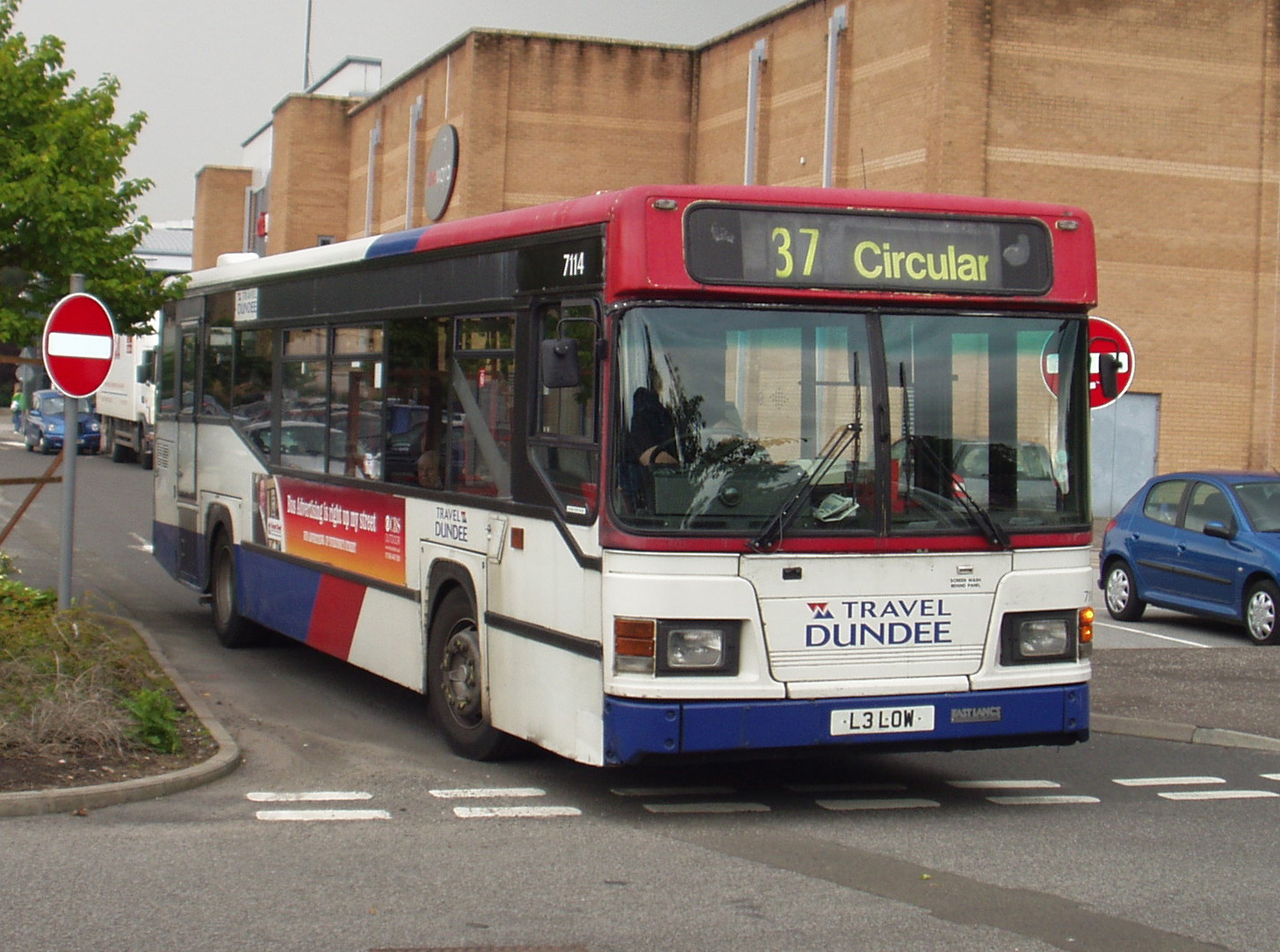
Travel Dundee East Lancs East Lancs MaxCi bodied Scania N113CRL in August 2008

In February 1997, Tayside was sold to National Express and was subsequently rebranded Travel Dundee. The livery changed again, this time to blue, red and white.

Travel Dundee had been a contractor to Scottish Citylink for many years. However, shortly after the formation of a joint venture between Citylink and Stagecoach in November 2005, Travel Dundee's services ceased. They were reinstated at short notice from 9 January 2006 when extra journeys were added to route M91 from Perth direct to Edinburgh. In May 2006, Travel Dundee commenced operating journeys on route M90 Perth - Kinross - Dunfermline - Edinburgh. Citylink ceased for the third time in September 2008, as part of a review of coaching activities.

In November 2007, the National Express Group announced plans to re-brand all of their operations under a new unified National Express identity. Travel Dundee was rebranded as National Express Dundee in line with the group's other bus operations in October 2008, with buses taking on a red and white livery.

On 12 September 2015 National Express Dundee was rebranded as Xplore Dundee, with a green livery resembling that of Dundee Corporation Transport.

In December 2020 the National Express Group sold the business to McGill's Bus Services.

== Routes ==
Xplore Dundee operates a total of fourteen standard city network routes across the City of Dundee, seven school services for Dundee City Council, a service in Aberdeen, and a coach journey that runs from Dundee to Edinburgh Airport. The company's routes serve major destinations including Ninewells Hospital, Dundee City Centre, Broughty Ferry, and stretching to the boarders of the city, providing frequent cross-city connections.

Most services operate on a high-frequency basis within Dundee, particularly along key corridors such as Perth Road, Blackness Road, Hilltown, Strathmartine Road, and Arbroath Road.

All vehicles are branded for clarity, with colour coding used on vehicles and timetables to distinguish individual routes. Broughty Ferry routes were blue, service 22 yellow, and service 28 branded. This, however, was subsequently removed from its fleet and its livery changed.

== Fleet ==
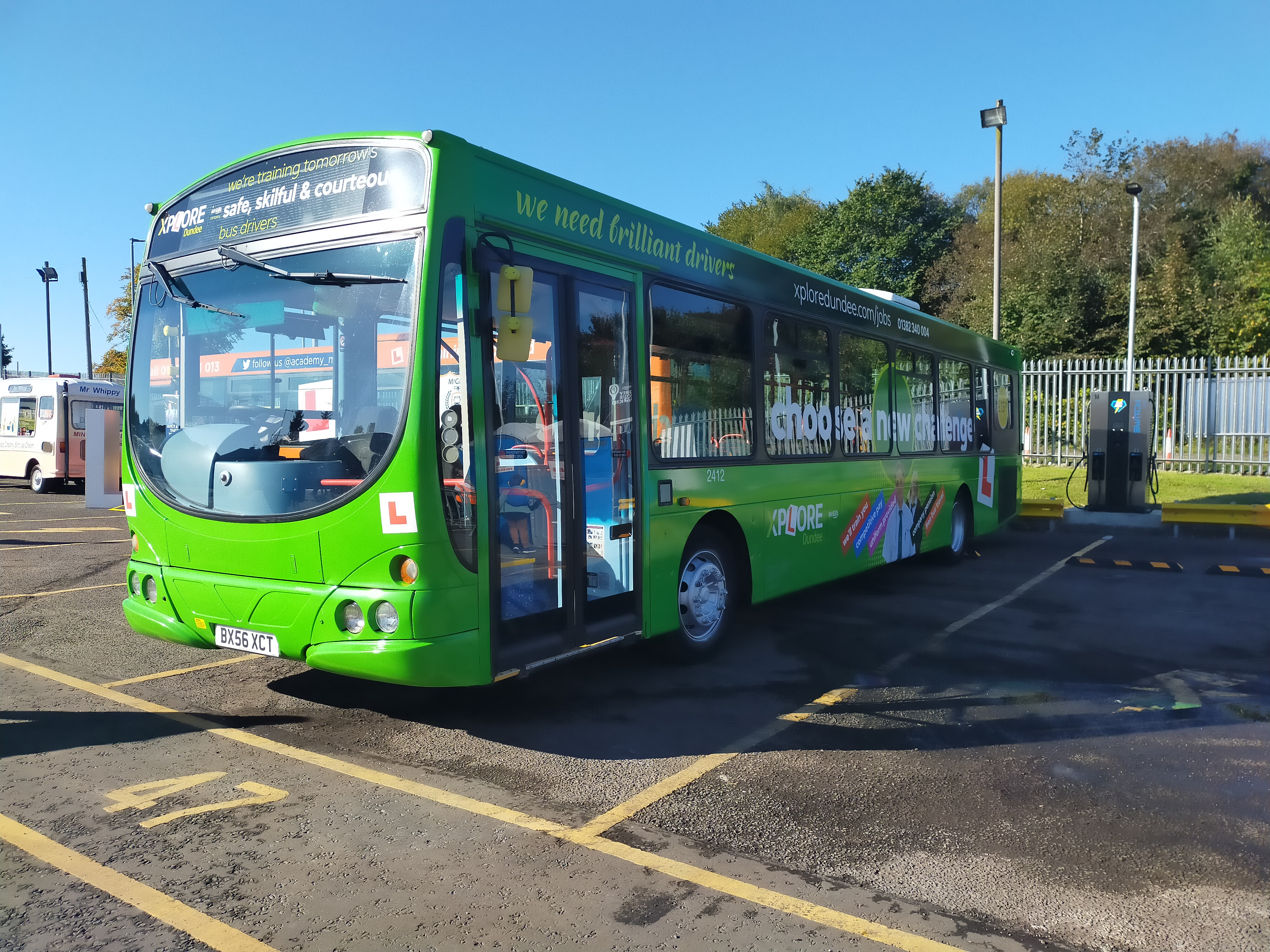
Xplore Dundee Wright Eclipse Urban bodied Volvo B7RLE at McGill's Johnstone depot in September 2022

As of June 2025, Xplore Dundee operates a fleet of around 88 buses and coaches.

From 1997 to 1999, shortly after National Express took over, Travel Dundee received 30 Wright Liberator-bodied Volvo B10Ls and 25 Wright Renown-bodied Volvo B10BLEs. In 2004, the fleet was upgraded with 18 new Wright Eclipse Gemini double-deckers. The company later purchased 29 new Wright Eclipse Urban 2-bodied Volvo B7RLEs in 2011 and 2012, which were used to replace older vehicles, and in 2013, the company received its first nine Alexander Dennis Enviro400H hybrid electric buses, partly funded by the Scottish Government Green Bus Fund.

Following the rebrand to Xplore Dundee in 2015, the company took delivery of 14 brand new Alexander Dennis Enviro400 MMC buses, branded as 'Emerald' buses and with USB-A charging and free Wi-Fi, in December 2018, primarily for service 22. These were supplemented with a further nine Emerald-specification Enviro400 MMCs in early 2020, after which the company pledged not to buy another diesel-powered vehicle, these with the addition of mirrorless camera systems. This model of buses were branded with 5/9/10 Blue livery & 22 Yellow livery before gradually being removed.

In December 2021, following the takeover of the company by McGill's, twelve new BYD Alexander Dennis Enviro400EV battery electric buses entered service with Xplore Dundee on service 28 between Myrekirk and Douglas, and service 18 between Dundee city centre and Claverhouse / Mill o' Mains, claimed to be one of Scotland's most polluted roads.

During 2023, Xplore Dundee acquired thirteen ADL Enviro400 double decker buses, which were put on services 1 & 32/33. In 2023, three different models of double-decker electric buses were trialled on various local services between October and December 2023 as part of the operator's 'Project Boost' initiative; following these trials, twelve U11DDs entered service with the company in March 2025 which are mainly used on service 22 from Ninewells Hospital to Craigowl.

== Services ==
=== Fly ===
Fly (stylised FLY) is an express coach service operated by Xplore Dundee, operating 24 hours to a 60-90 minute frequency between Dundee City Centre and Edinburgh Airport. The service, originally known as the X90, was launched on June 9, 2019; the service was relaunched following the COVID-19 pandemic in June 2021 with green and turquoise coaches.

=== Discover Dundee ===
Xplore Dundee had launched an open top bus tour named 'Discover Dundee' across Dundee in April 2022, which travelled across the city from Discovery Point to the Dundee Law, with an extension route across the Tay Road Bridge and connected to other conventional bus routes via the city centre.

=== Xplore Aberdeen ===
In the time around 2025, Xplore Dundee launched the Xplore Aberdeen services, which runs the service 14 to Kingswells Village to Aberdeen City Centre, with its three branded Volvo B7RLE Wright Eclipse buses.

== Logo history ==
Former logos

Logo from 1997–2008

Logo from 2008–2015

Logo from 2015-2023
