= Wright Renown =

Low-floor bus body on Volvo B10BLE chassis

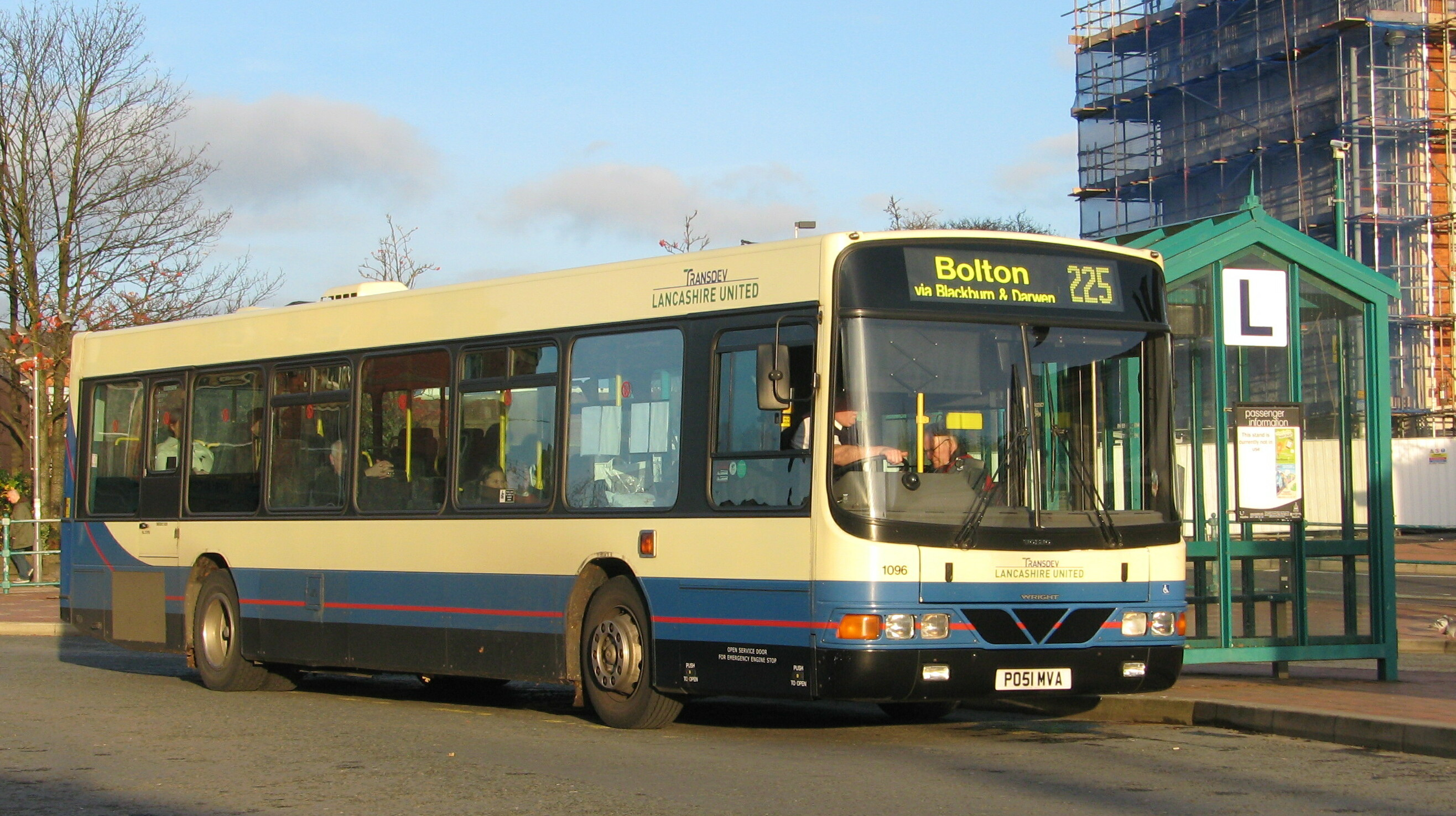
- Transdev Lancashire United Wright Renown bodied Volvo B10BLE in Blackburn in November 2010

Overview
- Manufacturer: Wrightbus
- Production: 1997–2002
- Assembly: Ballymena, Northern Ireland
- Designer: Trevor Erskine

Body and chassis
- Doors: 1 or 2
- Floor type: Low floor
- Chassis: Volvo B10BLE

Powertrain
- Engine: Volvo DH10A-245
- Capacity: 44 seated
- Transmission: ZF Ecomat 5HP500; Voith DIWA D851.3

Dimensions
- Length: 11.8 metres (39 ft)
- Width: 2.5 metres (8 ft 2 in)
- Height: 3 metres (9.8 ft)

Chronology
- Predecessor: Wright Liberator
- Successor: Wright Eclipse

The Wright Renown is a low floor single-decker bus body built on Volvo B10BLE chassis by Wrightbus in Ballymena, Northern Ireland.

== Design ==
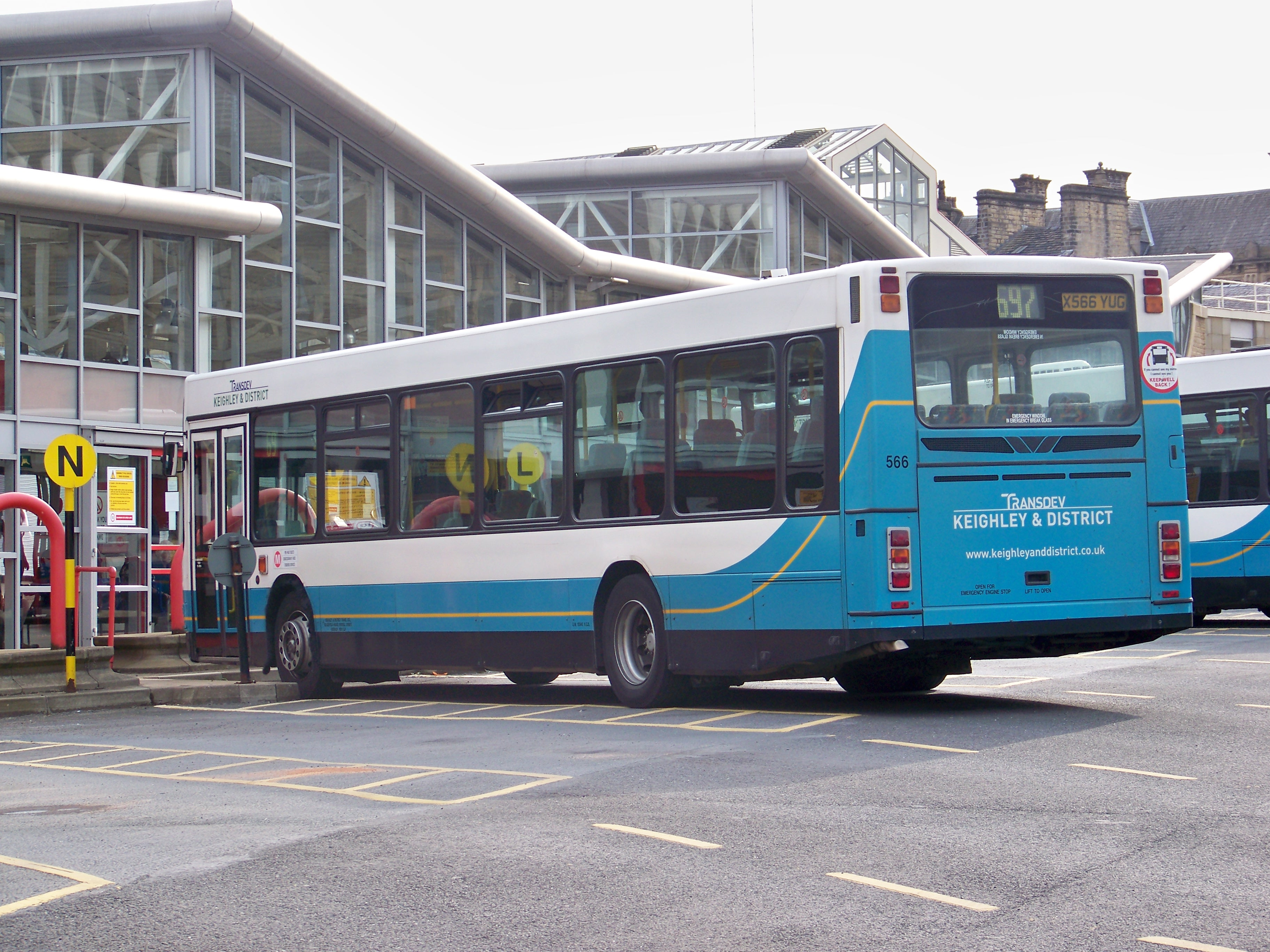
Rear of Keighley & District Wright Renown at Keighley bus station, August 2009

Launched as the successor to the Wright Liberator body on the Volvo B10L chassis in 1997, the Wright Renown was the first bus in the Wright range to debut the company's 'Floline' low-floor system. Compared to previous Wright low-entry buses which had multiple steps in the interior separating the entrance door from the back of the bus, the Renown had only one step along a gently sloped floor in the middle of the bus, with a manual wheelchair ramp at the entrance door also provided as standard. This system in both single and dual-door format was tested extensively at the Motor Industry Research Association's Warwickshire proving grounds before its official launch with the Renown.

Built with an Alusuisse bolted aluminium frame as standard among other Wright products at the time, the Renown was also the first 12 metres (39 ft) low-floor bus in Europe to feature gasket glazed windows as a result of the extra body strength from the Floline design; previous low-floor buses had featured bonded glazed windows, which took longer to replace and compromised the structural integrity of the body when broken.

The Renown, as well as the overall Floline concept, were replaced by the 'Millennium Design' Eclipse (later Eclipse Metro) on the Volvo B7L chassis. Due to the unpopularity of the longitudinal chassis, Wright developed the Eclipse Urban on the Volvo B7RLE chassis in 2003, which became the true successor of the Renown.

== Operators ==
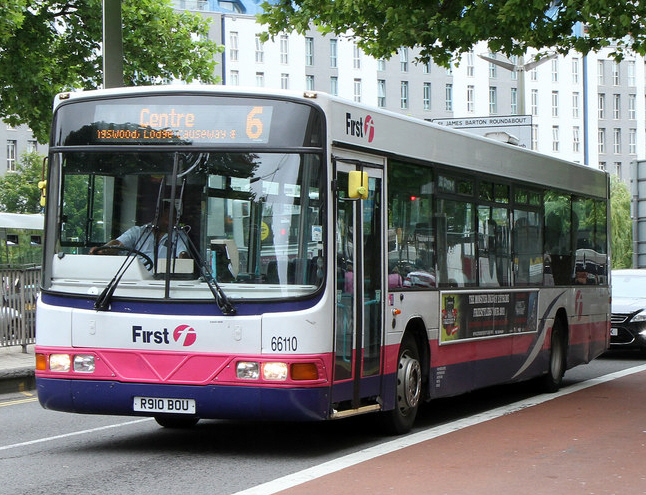
First Somerset and Avon Wright Renown in Bristol in June 2011

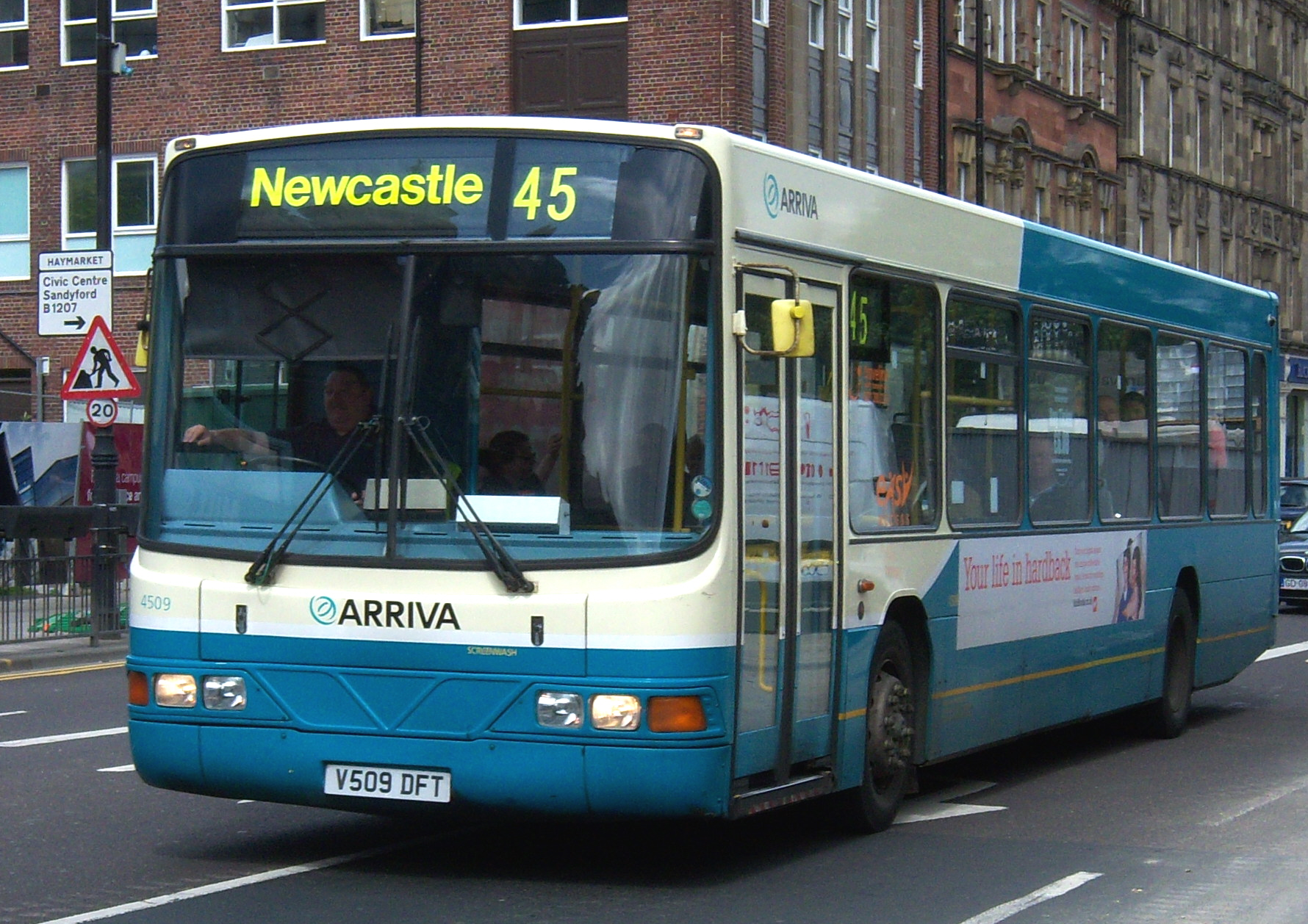
Arriva Northumbria Wright Renown in Newcastle upon Tyne in May 2009

Upon its launch, the FirstGroup placed an initial order for 112 Renowns for delivery to its Manchester, Bristol, West Yorkshire and Northampton operations, with the first nine production Renowns delivered as 'GOLDService' buses to First Manchester in late 1997; the group ordered further Renowns until 2001 for its South Yorkshire, Hampshire, Glasgow, Eastern Scotland and Aberdeen operations. These Renowns were among the first in the group's fleet to be delivered with a new low-floor interior design featuring purple, grey and aquamarine fittings and seat cushions as well as wider seat spacing and hard-wearing non-slip flooring.

The Renown was also highly popular with the Blazefield Group, with a total of 125 delivered to its Harrogate, Keighley, Yorkshire Coastliner, Lancashire United and Burnley operations throughout the type's production run. Among these, Blazefield took delivery of both the last Renowns built and the last Volvo B10BLEs for the UK market, consisting of an order for 41 examples that were delivered mainly to Lancashire United between late 2001 and early 2002.

Ninety Renowns were delivered to Translink of Northern Ireland between late 1999 and early 2000, with 45 each entering service with Citybus of Belfast and Ulsterbus respectively. Twenty Renowns were also delivered to Bus Éireann in 2000 for service in Cork.

The Wright Renown was also popular with some Go-Ahead Group companies. Go North East took delivery of 38 Renowns across four batches between 1998 and 2000, while 21 Renowns were delivered to Brighton & Hove in 1998. The Oxford Bus Company also took delivery of Renowns specified in dual-door arrangement to deal with heavy passenger crowding in the tourist city between 1999 and 2000.

Thirty Renowns were delivered to Arriva operations in Northumbria, West Scotland and The Shires during 1999, twenty-five Renowns were delivered to Travel Dundee between 1997 and 1999, while ten were delivered to Mainline Buses in December 1997 for service in Sheffield, with a further 20 ordered for delivery in 1998 prior to the company being acquired by the FirstGroup. Liverpool-based independent CMT Buses took delivery of eighteen Renowns between 1999 and 2000, while the Renown was also popular with some independently-run bus companies in Scotland, with examples delivered to Hutchinson's of Overtown as well as White of Walls, Shetland.
