= Wright Fusion =

Low-floor articulated bus body on Volvo B10LA chassis

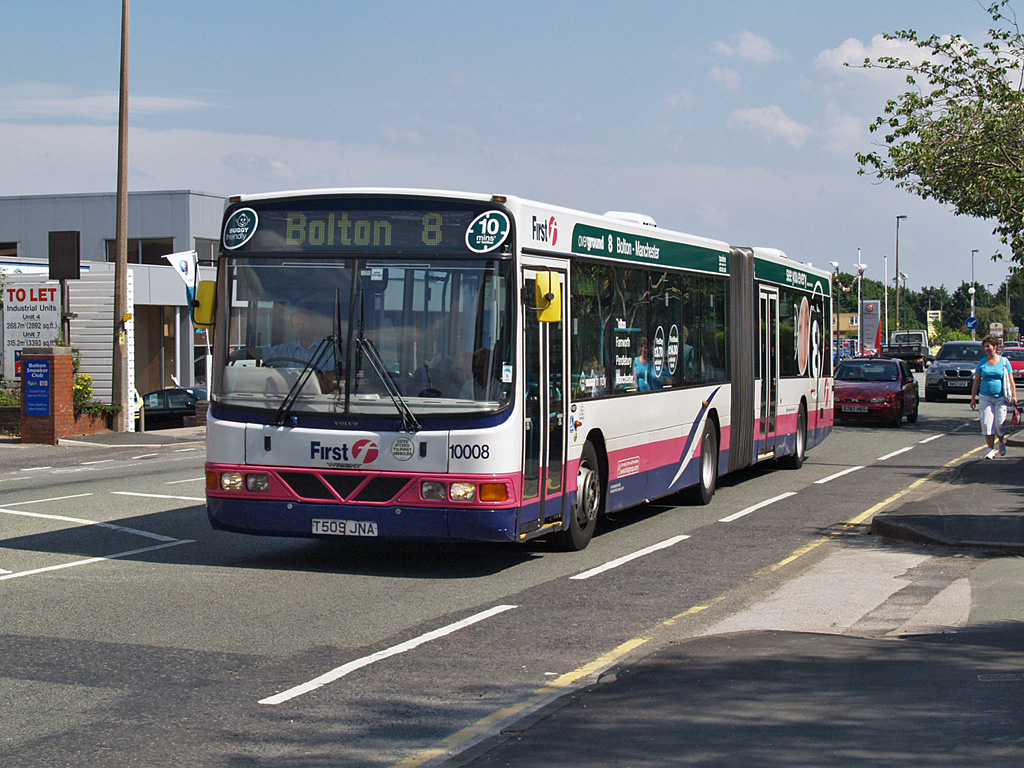
- First Manchester Wright Fusion bodied Volvo B10LA in Bolton in July 2008

Overview
- Manufacturer: Wrightbus
- Production: 1998 - 1999
- Assembly: Ballymena, Northern Ireland

Body and chassis
- Doors: 2 or 3
- Floor type: Low floor
- Chassis: Volvo B10LA
- Related: Wright Liberator

Powertrain
- Engine: Volvo DH10A
- Capacity: 140 (55 seated, 85 standing)
- Transmission: ZF 4HP590

Dimensions
- Length: 18 metres (59 ft)
- Width: 2.5 metres (8 ft 2 in)
- Height: 3 metres (9.8 ft)

Chronology
- Successor: Wright Eclipse Fusion

The Wright Fusion was a low floor tri-axle articulated single-decker bus body built on the Volvo B10LA chassis by Wrightbus from 1998 until 1999. Revealed in late 1998, the 18 metres (59 ft) Fusion was the articulated version of the Wright Liberator, sharing the same body components and Alusuisse bolted aluminium frame system with most other Wright products of the time. Features new to the Fusion included options for two or three doors, with rear doors featuring an experimental one-way gate to combat fare evasion, roof-mounted air tanks and multiplexed wiring for the bus' electrical system.

All 40 were purchased by the FirstGroup for its Glasgow, Leeds and Manchester subsidiaries. In October 2001, four were sent from Glasgow to First London's Greenford garage to operate a six-month trial on route 207.

Later Wrightbus models also used the Fusion name, but in conjunction with the name of the equivalent full-size rigid single-decker. These were the Solar Fusion on the Scania L94UA chassis, and the Eclipse Fusion on the Volvo B7LA.
