= Wright Eclipse Fusion =

Low-floor articulated bus body on Volvo B7LA chassis

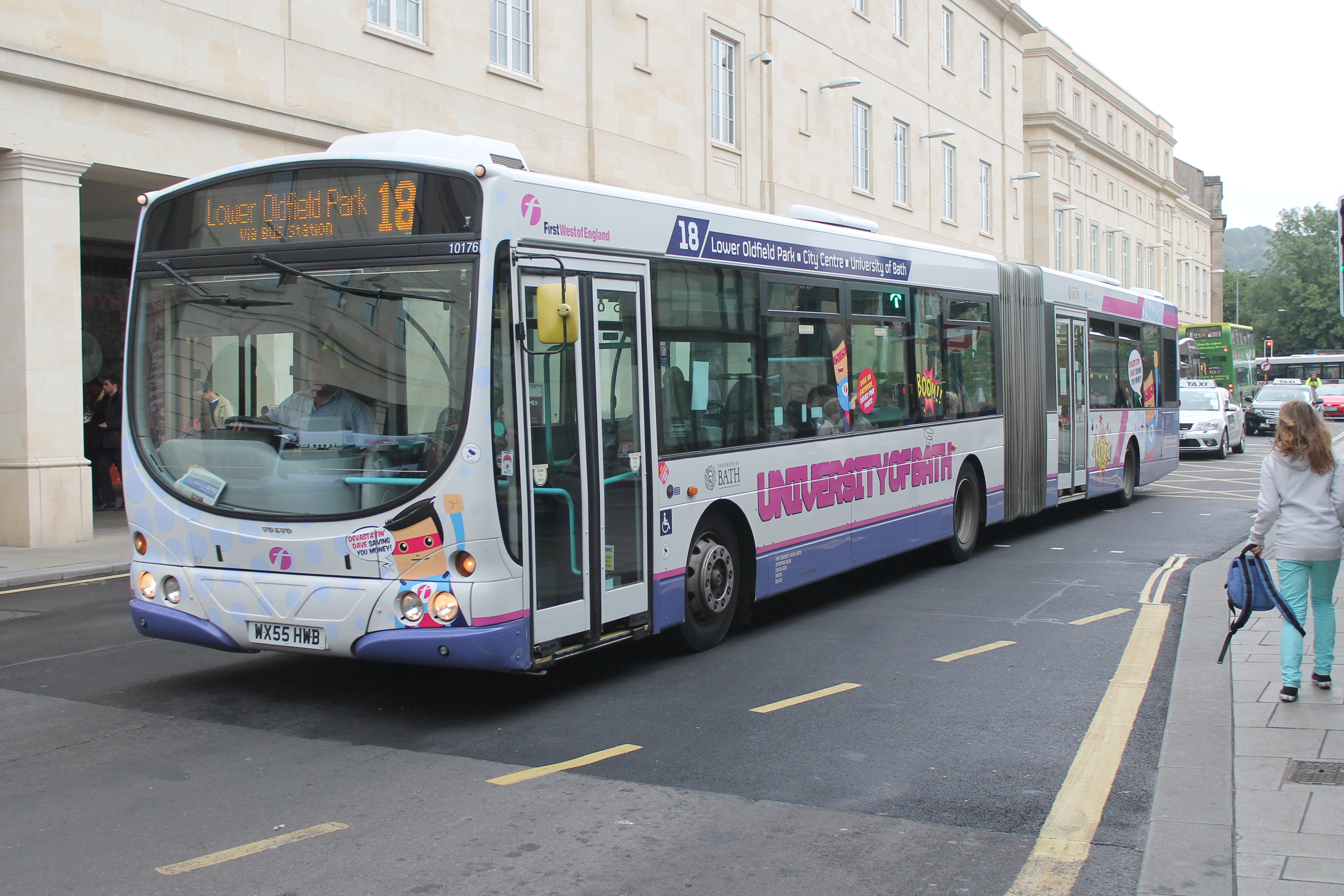
- First Somerset & Avon Wright Eclipse Fusion bodied Volvo B7LA in Bath in September 2013

Overview
- Manufacturer: Wrightbus
- Production: 1999–2005
- Assembly: Ballymena, Northern Ireland

Body and chassis
- Doors: 2 or 3
- Floor type: Low floor
- Chassis: Volvo B7LA
- Related: Wright Eclipse

Powertrain
- Engine: Volvo D7C
- Transmission: ZF Friedrichshafen

Dimensions
- Length: 17.95 m
- Width: 2.50 m
- Height: 3.00 m

Chronology
- Predecessor: Wright Fusion
- Successor: Wright StreetCar

The Wright Eclipse Fusion was a low floor articulated single-decker bus body built on the Volvo B7LA chassis by Wrightbus. It was the articulated version of the Wright Eclipse, succeeding the Wright Fusion.

Of the 88 produced, the FirstGroup took delivery of 67 Wright Eclipse Fusions between 2000 and 2005, with the majority entering service with First Aberdeen, First West of England for services in Bath and First West Yorkshire for services in Bradford, with smaller fleets delivered to First Hampshire & Dorset and First Glasgow. The other 21 Fusions were delivered to Dublin Bus in 2000.

In October 2001, two Wright Eclipse Fusions were sent from First Hampshire & Dorset to First London's Greenford garage to operate a six-month trial on route 207. One was painted into First London's fleet livery during this period. No orders resulted from the trial and the Fusions were returned a year later.

The FirstGroup would later partner with Wrightbus in developing the Wright StreetCar, which is built on a modified version of the chassis used for the Eclipse Fusion. Most of the Eclipse Fusions are similar in appearance to its Wrightbus single deckers with the arched roof.
