= Wright Liberator =

Low-floor bus body on Volvo B10L chassis

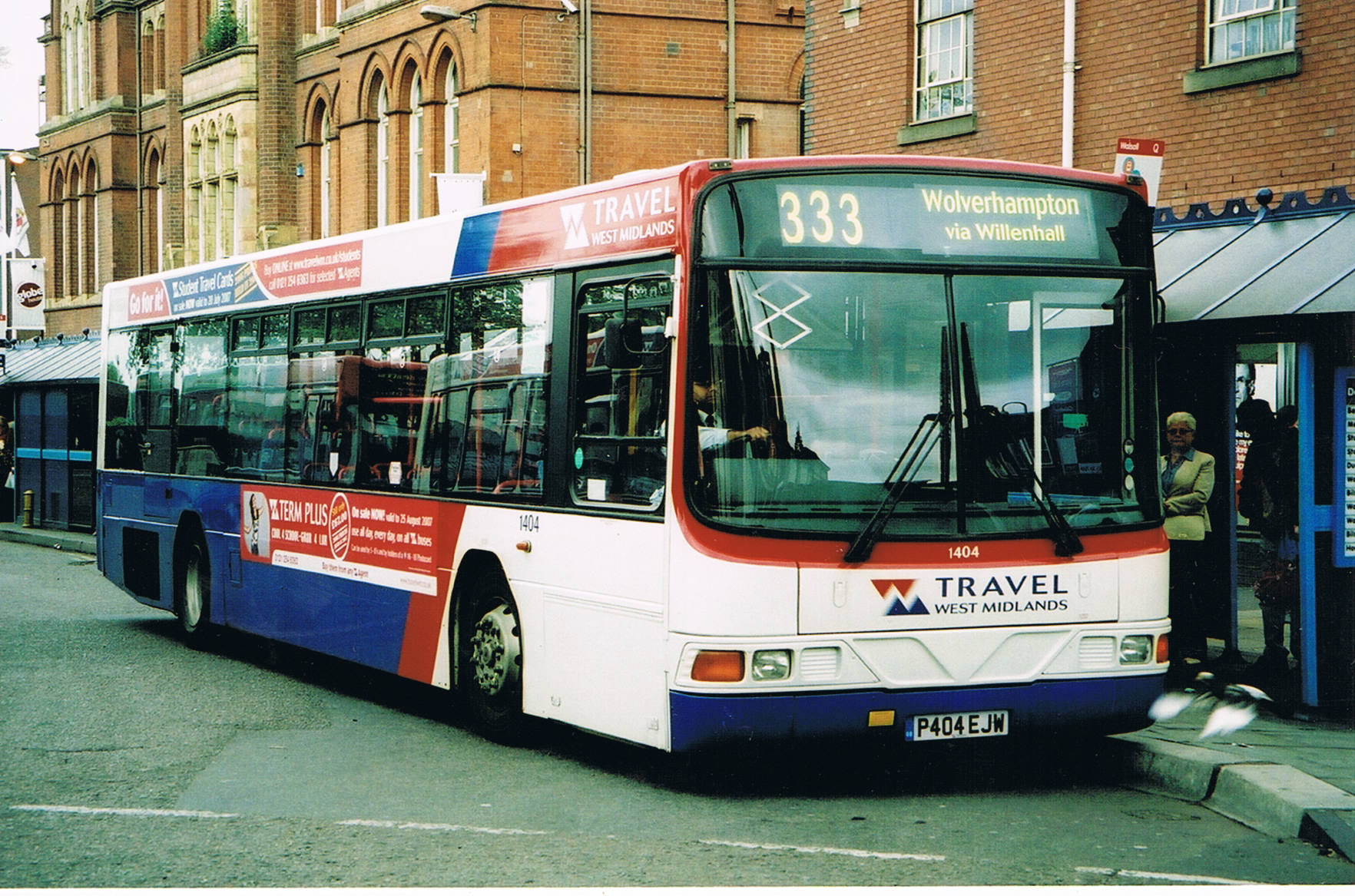
- Travel West Midlands Wright Liberator bodied Volvo B10L in Walsall

Overview
- Manufacturer: Wrightbus
- Production: 1996 - 1999
- Assembly: Ballymena, Northern Ireland
- Designer: Trevor Erskine

Body and chassis
- Doors: 1 or 2
- Floor type: Low floor
- Chassis: Volvo B10L
- Related: Wright Fusion

Powertrain
- Capacity: 67 (47 seated, 20 standing)

Chronology
- Predecessor: Wright Endurance
- Successor: Wright Renown

The Wright Liberator was a low-floor single-deck bus body built on Volvo B10L chassis by Wrightbus between 1996 and 1999.

== Design ==
The Wright Liberator was announced in October 1995 by Wrightbus, joining its range of bodies on Volvo chassis such as the Pathfinder and Crusader. The bus was constructed with an Alusuisse bolted aluminium frame and took advantage of the B10L chassis to create a step-free floor up to the rear axle. The Liberator was succeeded in 1999 by the Renown on the Volvo B10BLE chassis.

== Operators ==
The Liberator's launch customer was First Greater Manchester, who after ordering the buses as GM Buses North, took delivery of five of the type branded for 'Superbus' low-floor services between Wigan and Leigh in June 1996. The National Express Group were the Liberator's overall largest customer, with over 100 purchased by their Travel Dundee and Travel West Midlands subsidiaries. Eleven were also purchased by Bus Éireann in Ireland.
