= Volvo B10L =

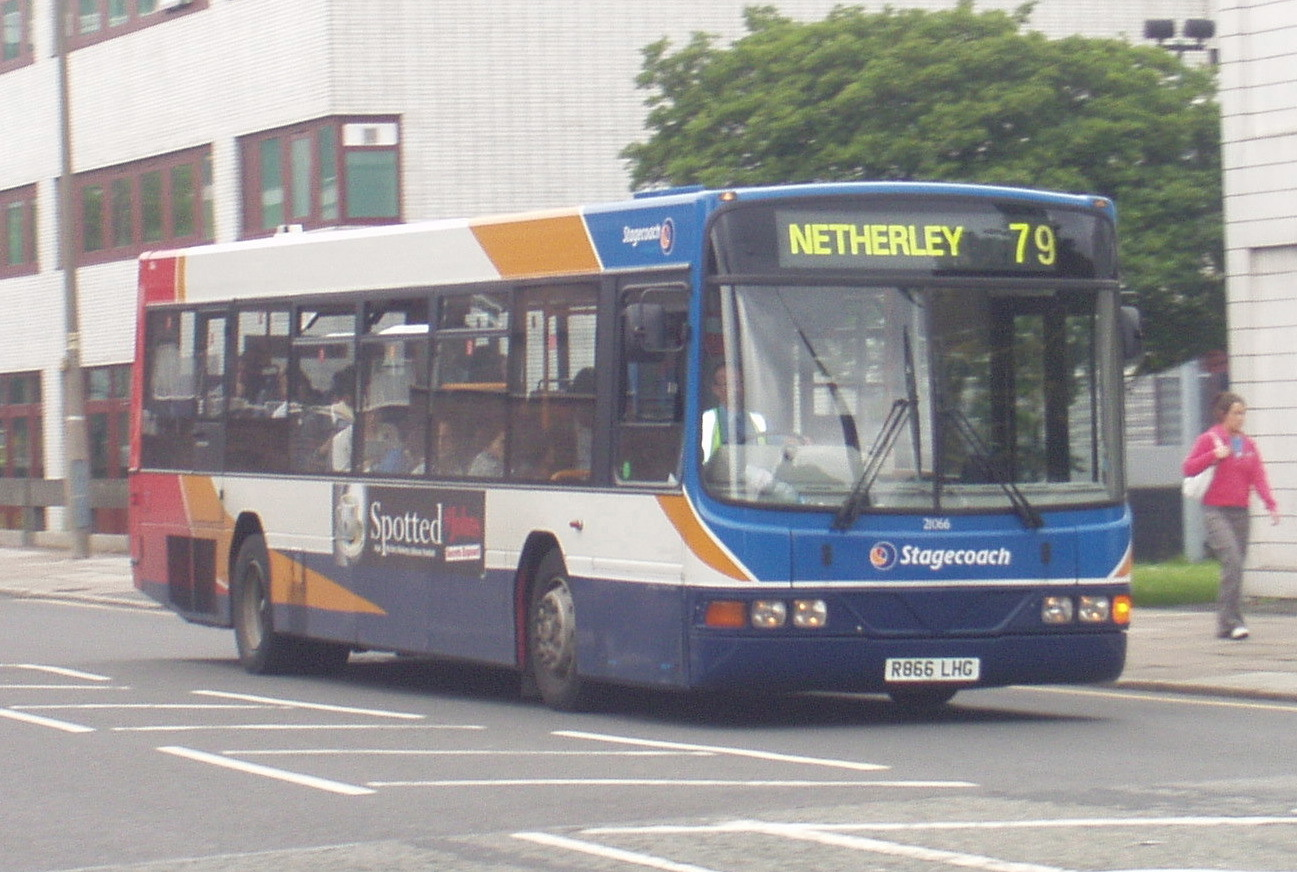
- A Wright Liberator-bodied Volvo B10L.

Overview
- Manufacturer: Volvo
- Production: 1993–2005

Body and chassis
- Class: Bus chassis
- Doors: 1, 2 or 3 doors
- Floor type: Low floor

Dimensions
- Length: 12.0 to 18.0 m (39 ft 4 in to 59 ft 1 in)
- Width: 2.5 m (8 ft 2 in)
- Height: 3.0 m (9 ft 10 in)

The Volvo B10L was a rear-engined, low-floor single-decker public bus chassis built by Volvo between c. 1993 and c. 2005. An articulated version of the B10L, known as the B10LA, was also produced.

== United Kingdom ==
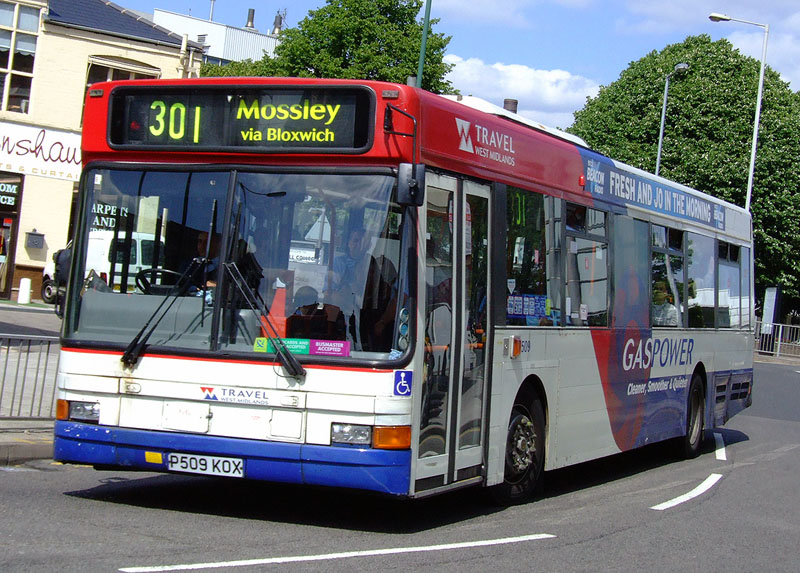
CNG-powered B10L of Travel West Midlands.

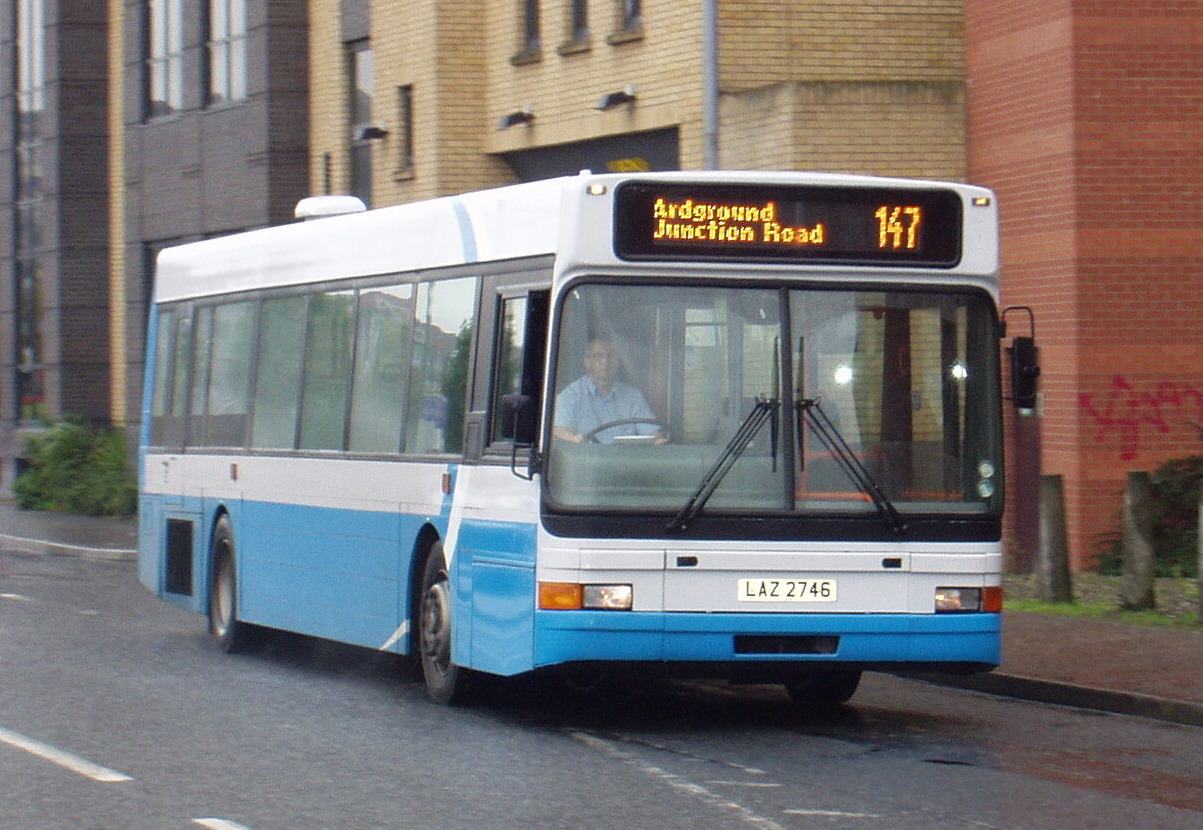
Diesel-engined B10L with Alexander Ultra bodywork in the Ulsterbus fleet

The B10L was available in the United Kingdom and Ireland between 1994 and 1999, with a choice of two types of bodywork, the Alexander Ultra and the Wright Liberator. The Alexander Ultra body was marketed by Volvo and based on a design produced by Volvo subsidiary Säffle, who built the body on the first B10L imported to the United Kingdom. The bodywork by Wrightbus proved slightly more popular.

In the United Kingdom, the articulated B10LA was bodied exclusively by Wrightbus for FirstGroup subsidiaries in Manchester (15), Leeds (15) and Glasgow (10). The Wright body for the B10LA is named Fusion.

The B10L enjoyed limited success in Britain. In 1997 the Volvo B10BLE was introduced to the British market, and this chassis rapidly became more popular. The B10BLE was cheaper than the B10L, and shared more in common with the step-entrance B10B, examples of which were already owned by many of its customers.

=== Operators ===
The largest operators of Volvo B10L buses in the United Kingdom were Travel West Midlands and Travel Dundee, who ordered over 100 conventional diesel-powered chassis with Wright Liberator bodywork in 1996. Travel West Midlands also ordered 14 CNG-powered buses with Alexander Ultra bodies in 1997; the CNG Ultras were later converted to run on conventional diesel.

The second largest operator of B10Ls Translink, who purchased sixty B10Ls with Alexander Ultra bodies in 1995. Fifty of these were allocated to Citybus, while ten were allocated to Ulsterbus services in Derry. Two ex-demonstrator Ultras were also acquired.

The FirstGroup were a notable operator of the Volvo B10L. First Glasgow ordered ten B10Ls with Wright Liberator bodywork, while five similar B10Ls were ordered by GM Buses North in 1995 for operation on Superbus routes between Wigan and Leigh. These were delivered in 1996, by which time GM Buses North had become First Greater Manchester. First Northampton, meanwhile, ordered nine B10Ls with Alexander Ultra bodies. Six of these were CNG-fuelled, while the remaining three were powered by conventional diesel.

Other customers included CMT Buses, who purchased 10 Wrights, and Timeline of Wigan, who purchased 6 Ultras with grant funding from Greater Manchester PTE. Four Alexander Ultra-bodied B10L demonstrators were produced, with the first Ultra-bodied B10L produced being delivered to Mainline Buses in 1994. Mainline did not order any further examples and quickly disposed of the demonstrator.

== Ireland ==
Eleven Wright Liberator-bodied B10Ls are operated by Bus Éireann in Cork, and sister CIÉ company Dublin Bus purchased five Alexander Ultra-bodied B10Ls for use in Dublin. A sixth, experimental LPG-powered, Ultra was leased and later returned.

== Finland ==
Helsingin Bussiliikenne purchased 41 Volvo B10L buses with Carrus City U bodies between 1995 and 1999; 21 of these are gas-powered. Pohjolan Liikenne bought four Volvo B10L buses with Lahden Autokori 402 bodies in 1999.

Tampereen kaupunkiliikenne purchased eight articulated Volvo B10LA buses with Carrus City U bodies between 1996–1998 and in 2008.

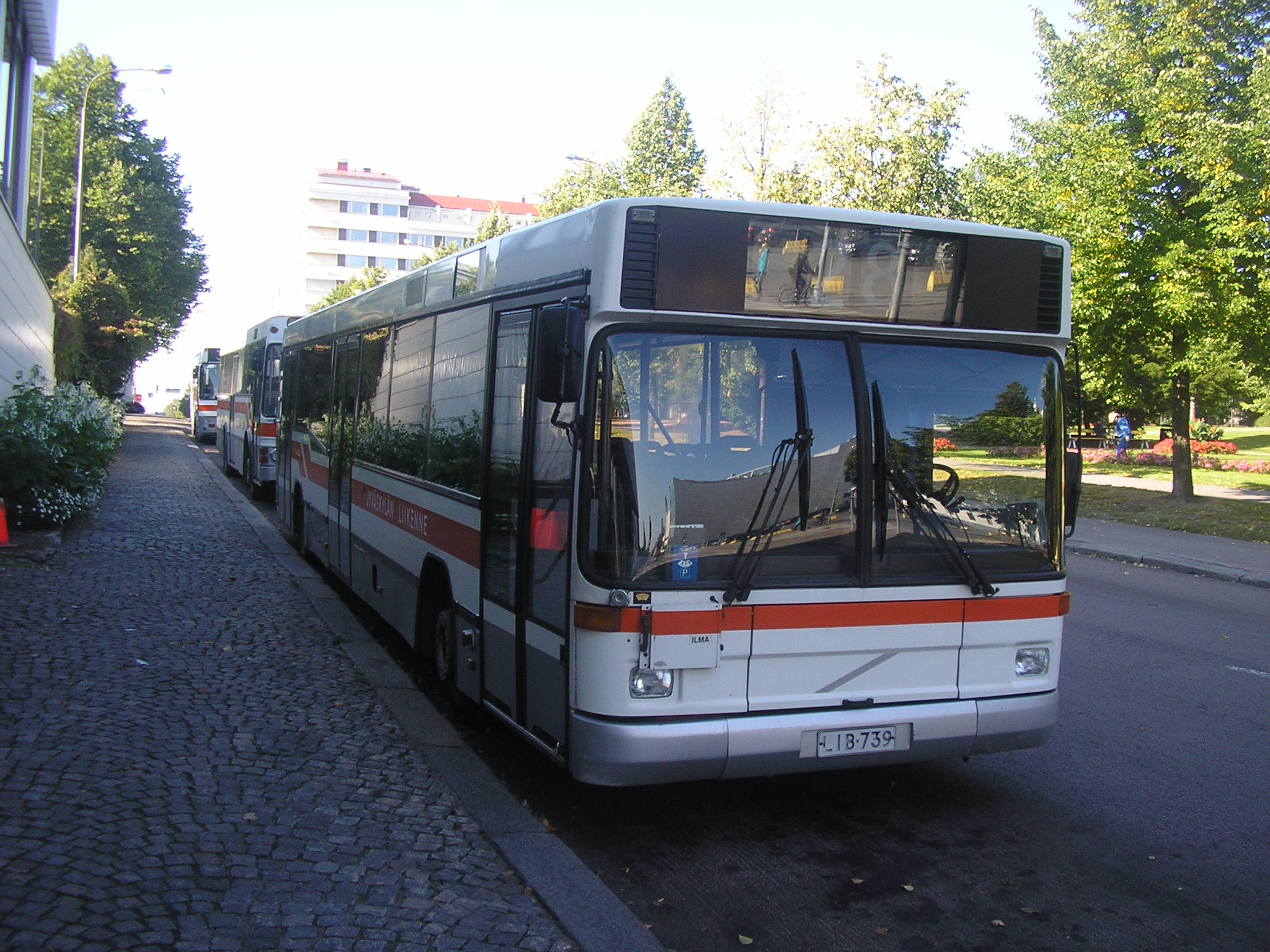
Jyväskylän Liikenne B10L

Jyväskylän Liikenne purchased 29 Volvo B10L buses with Carrus City U bodies built between 1997 and 1998. Some of these buses were bought from Kuopion Liikenne. Koiviston Auto has five Volvo B10L buses with Carrus City U bodies bought in 1997 and 1998.

== Australia ==
Transport for Brisbane purchased 54 Volvo B10L buses with Austral-Pacific Orana body as well as six with Volgren CR222L body, all were withdrawn between 2012 and 2015.

== See also ==
- List of buses
