= Volvo B10B =

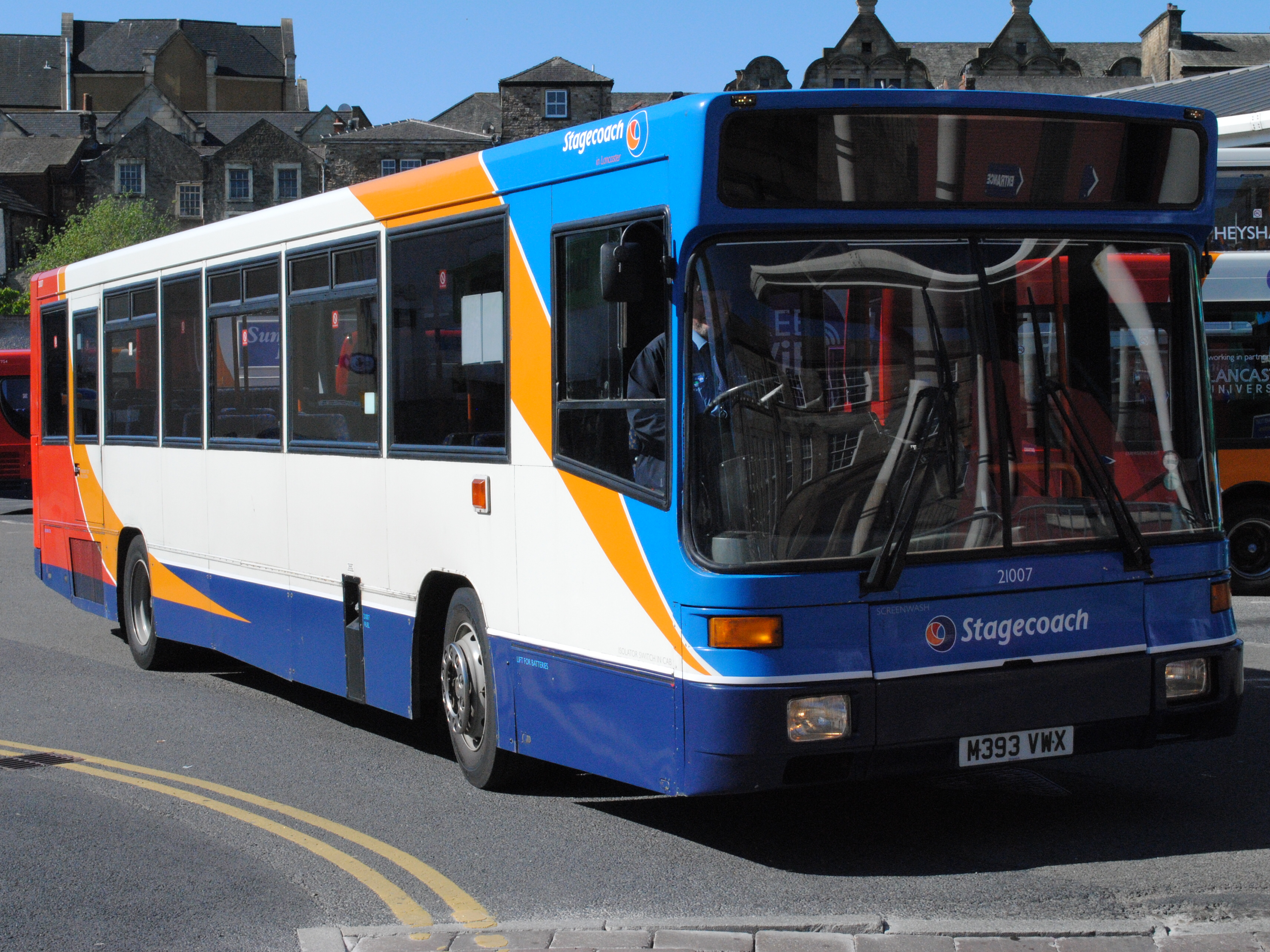
- Stagecoach Cumbria & North Lancashire Alexander Strider bodied Volvo B10B in Lancashire in May 2013

Overview
- Manufacturer: Volvo
- Production: 1992–2001
- Assembly: Sweden

Body and chassis
- Class: Bus chassis
- Doors: 1, 2 or 3
- Floor type: Step entrance
- Related: Volvo B10BLE

Powertrain
- Engine: 9.6-litre (585.83 cu in) horizontally rear-mounted I-6; Volvo THD101, THD102, THD103, THD104, DH10A, GH10A
- Transmission: Voith; ZF

Dimensions
- Length: 12.0m (39.37 ft)
- Width: 2.5m (8.20 ft)
- Height: 3.0m (9.84 ft)

Chronology
- Predecessor: Leyland Lynx; Volvo B10R
- Successor: Volvo B7R; Volvo B12B Volvo B10BLE (by application)

The Volvo B10B is a retired rear-engined step deck single-decker bus chassis manufactured by Volvo between 1992 and 2001. The first prototype were built in 1990 although the B10B wasn't launched until the 1992 Geneva Motor Show. It superseded the Leyland Lynx (by then a Volvo product) and Volvo B10R. For stage use it was gradually succeeded by the low-entry B10BLE, which was introduced only a year later, though not in all markets. For interurban use the B7R came as a gradual replacement in 1998, and ultimately for coach work, the B12B took over in 2001.

The B10B was not generally available with a natural gas or biogas engine, like the B10BLE, but two buses were bodied by Vest Karosseri for NSB Biltrafikk in Stavanger in 1998 and 1999.

In the United Kingdom, the B10B was purchased in large numbers by GM Buses North, Merseybus, Oxford Bus Company, Trent and Yorkshire Rider.

In Australia, the B10B was purchased in small numbers by Glenorie Bus Company, Grenda Corporation, North & Western Bus Lines, Parramatta-Ryde Bus Service and Westbus.

== Portugal ==
Portugal has

- Camo Camus
- Camo Camus 3.4
- Camo Minerva
- Camo Jupiter
- Camo Jupiter II
- Irmãos Mota Atomic MK VII, MK VIII, UR95, and UR2000
- Marcopolo Tricana
- Alfredo Caetano Fenix
- GAF Voga

== Competitors (chassis) ==
- Dennis Falcon
- Dennis Lance
- Leyland Lynx
- Leyland National
- MAN SL200
- MAN SL202
- Mercedes-Benz O405
- Renault PR100.2
- Scania L113CRB
- Scania N113CRB
- Volvo B10M
