= Volvo B10BLE =

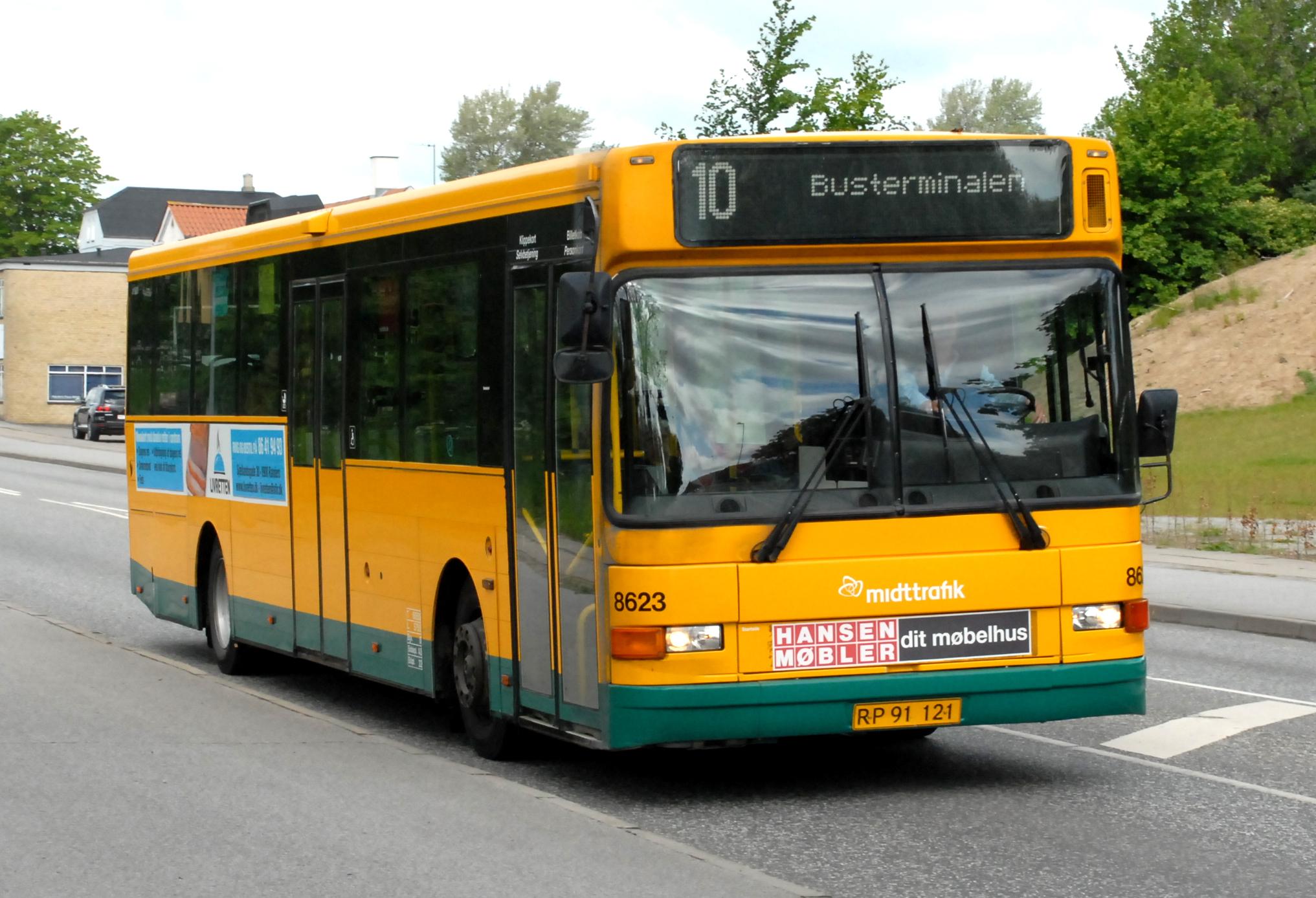
- Säffle 2000NL-bodied B10BLE in Randers, Denmark

Overview
- Manufacturer: Volvo
- Production: 1993–2004
- Assembly: Sweden

Body and chassis
- Class: Bus chassis
- Doors: 1, 2 or 3
- Floor type: Low entry
- Related: Volvo B10B

Powertrain
- Engine: 9.6-litre horizontally rear-mounted I-6; Volvo THD103/THD104/DH10A (Diesel); Volvo THG103/GH10A/GH10B/GH10C (CNG/biogas)
- Capacity: 30 to 45 seated

Dimensions
- Length: 12.0m, 13.7m and 14.5m
- Width: 2500mm
- Height: 3000mm

Chronology
- Successor: Volvo B7RLE; Volvo B12BLE

The Volvo B10BLE is a rear-engined low-entry single-decker bus chassis manufactured by Volvo in Sweden between 1993 and 2004. The first prototypes were built in 1992, but mass production started in 1993, only a year after the high-floor B10B. It was popular in Australia, Scandinavia and the United Kingdom. It had the engine mounted on the rear overhang of the bus. It became the successor of the city bus version of the B10B and was used as a base for single-decker buses worldwide. The B10BLE was available in diesel powered format, and later in a compressed natural gas powered format with the fuel tanks on the roof of the bus. Its low-floor design was widely promoted by Volvo when it was first launched, on the basis of added convenience to the passengers, and the increase in transport efficiency due to the low-floor design.

The production of the diesel powered variants ended in 2001 to give way for B7RLE and B12BLE, while the CNG variants were produced until 2004. In the United Kingdom market, Volvo unsuccessfully tried to replace the B10BLE with the B7L in 2001, but realised that it was not as popular among the customers and offered the B7RLE from 2003. This situation was similar to B10L one, which was replaced by B10BLE in 1997, three years after B10L was introduced here and also due to limited success.

== Specifications ==
The Volvo B10BLE features a Volvo DH10A engine with a displacement of 9,600 cc (586 cu in). It is an inline six-cylinder four-stroke diesel engine with a turbocharger and intercooler. This engine used a dry sump system due to being horizontally mounted. The engine has a power output of either 245 or 285 bhp (183 or 213 kW). The engine is able to meet Euro II emissions limits.

The name of the chassis stands for:

- B - Bus
- 10 - 10 (9.6) litre engine
- B - Back/Rear mounted engine
- LE - Low-entry

Optionally available is a Volvo GH10-series (GH10A, GH10B, GH10C) natural gas or biogas engine. All generations of this engine are inline four-stroke six-cylinder spark-ignition engines with a turbocharger and intercooler. The GH10A and GH10B engines were lean-burn engines and the GH10C is a "mixed-lean" engine, operating on an optimised balance between stoichiometric and lean-burn combustion strategies. Power ratings vary from 245 bhp (183 kW) in the GH10A to 290 bhp (220 kW) in the uprated version of the GH10C. The GH10C is able to meet Euro IV emissions limits.

== Operators ==
=== Australia ===
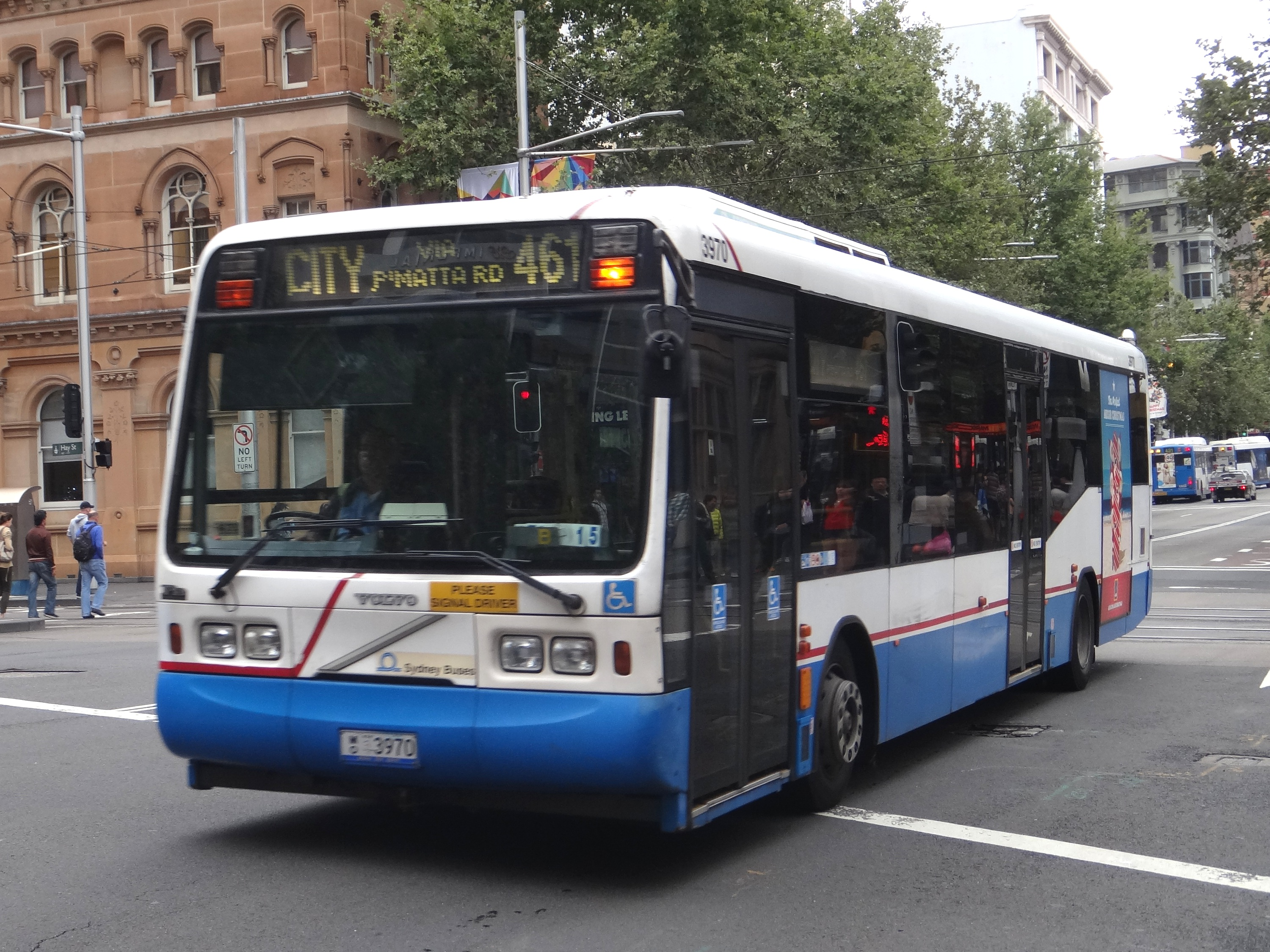
Sydney Buses Ansair bodied B10BLE

In Australia, Sydney Buses purchased 125, Westbus 41 and Grenda Corporation 16.

=== Europe ===
In mainland Europe, B10BLEs were bodied by Säffle/Aabenraa, Carrus and other local manufacturers.

=== United Kingdom ===
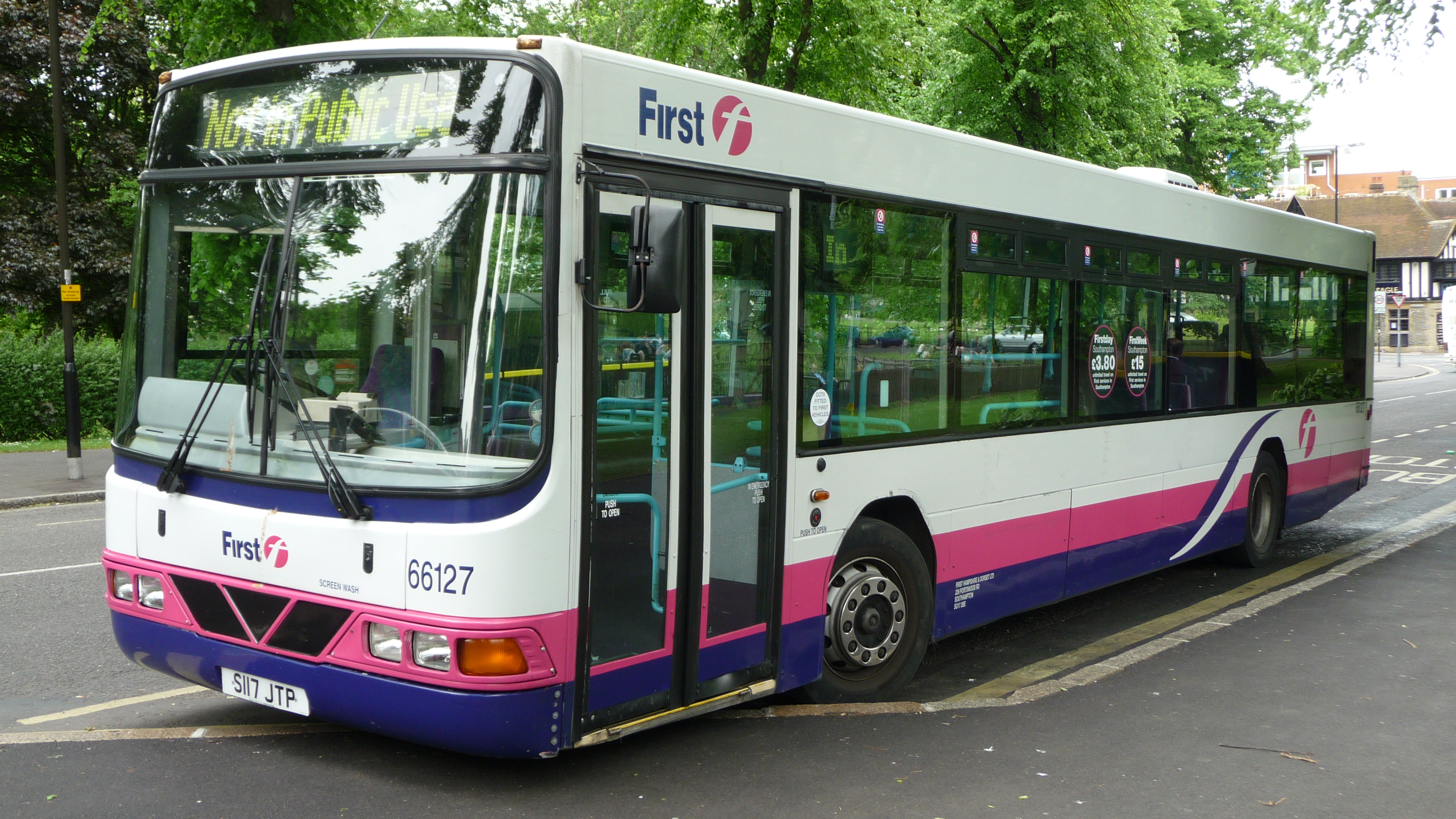
First Hampshire & Dorset Wright Renown bodied B10BLE in Southampton in May 2009

In the United Kingdom, many of the B10BLEs had Wright Renown bodywork, and a small number received Alexander ALX300 bodywork. The original Plaxton Prestige also featured the Volvo chassis as an option, but very few of these were built.
