= Arriva Southern Counties =

Bus operator in East Sussex, Kent and Essex

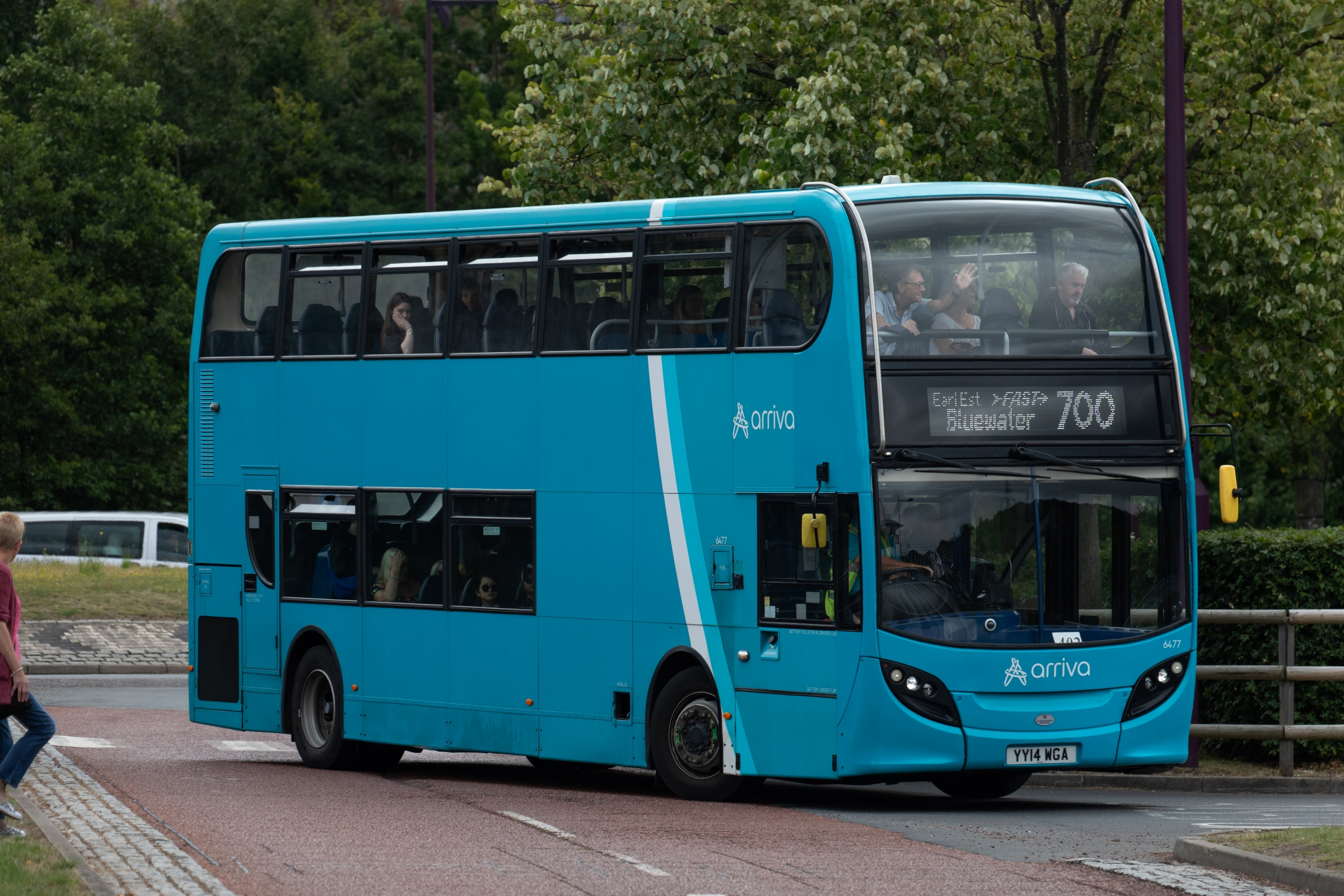
- An Alexander Dennis Enviro400 operating route 700, which runs between Chatham Waterfront bus station and Bluewater Shopping Centre
- Formerly: Invictaway
- Parent: Arriva UK Bus
- Founded: November 1986
- Commenced operation: April 1998
- Headquarters: Maidstone
- Service area: Essex; Harlow; Hemel Hempstead; Kent; Watford; Ware
- Service type: Bus services
- Hubs: Chatham, Maidstone, Tunbridge Wells
- Depots: 6
- Operator: Arriva Colchester; Arriva Kent & Sussex; Arriva Kent Thameside; Arriva Medway Towns; Arriva Southend
- Website: www.arrivabus.co.uk

Arriva Southern Counties Limited, trading as Arriva Southern Counties, is a bus operator in Kent, Essex, Hertfordshire, and East Sussex in England. It is a subsidiary of Arriva UK Bus, which is part of the Arriva group. The company operates local and interurban bus services across its divisions, including Arriva Kent Thameside, which serves north-west Kent.

== History ==
=== Origins and early expansion ===
Arriva Southern Counties traces its origins to the privatization of the National Bus Company in the 1980s. In November 1986, Maidstone & District was sold in a management buyout to a newly formed company, Einkorn Limited.

Einkorn expanded its operations through several key acquisitions:

- In June 1988, it acquired New Enterprise Coaches of Tonbridge.
- In December 1991, it took over Kent County Council contract services previously operated by Shearings.
- In June 1992, it purchased Boro'line Maidstone, further strengthening its presence in Kent.

=== British Bus acquisition ===
In 1990, British Bus acquired the Alder Valley operations in Cranleigh, Guildford, and Woking. This was followed by the acquisitions of Colchester Borough Transport and Southend Transport in 1993.

In April 1995, British Bus acquired Einkorn Limited, which had become a significant regional operator. British Bus already owned Kentish Bus (acquired in 1994) and Londonlinks (acquired in 1988). Following the acquisition, Einkorn was renamed Invictaway in August 1995, reviving a brand name previously used by Maidstone & District for London commuter services.

=== Cowie Group and rebranding ===
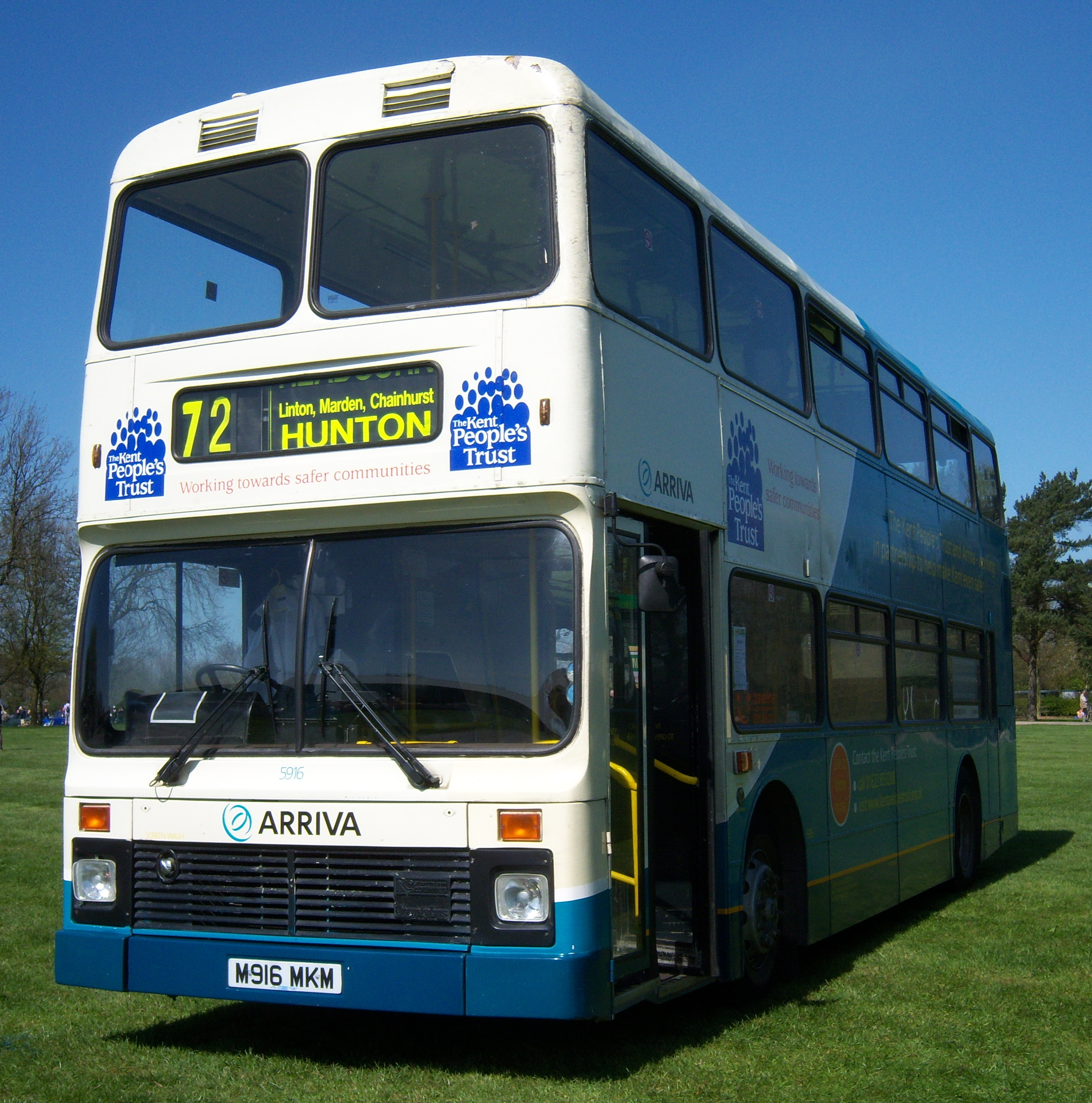
Arriva Kent & Sussex bus 5916 (M916 MKM) at the M&D 100 rally in Detling, wearing a distinctive cream-and-dark blue livery highlighting Kent People's Trust branding. New to M&D in 1994, it remained in West Kent service until its preservation in 2013.

In July to August 1996, the Cowie Group plc acquired British Bus, which owned several bus companies in southern England, including Kentish Bus, London & Country, and Maidstone & District, all of which had previously been subsidiaries of British Bus.

In October 1997, Cowie Group announced it would change its name to Arriva plc, as part of a strategic rebranding to unify its various transport businesses under a single identity. The rebrand was approved by shareholders on 6 November 1997, and the new name reflected the company's European ambitions and focus on integrated transport services.

As part of the subsequent rollout of the new branding, Invictaway, the legal name for the operations that included Maidstone & District and other southern subsidiaries, was renamed Arriva Southern Counties in April 1998. Around the same time, the operations of London & Country were also transferred into Arriva Southern Counties, under Arriva Guildford & West Surrey.

The restructuring of former British Bus subsidiaries was carried out as follows:

- Maidstone & District was divided into Arriva Kent & Sussex and Arriva Medway Towns.
- Kentish Bus was split between Arriva Kent Thameside and Arriva Kent & Sussex.
- London & Country became Arriva Guildford & West Surrey.
- Londonlinks became Arriva Croydon & North Surrey.

=== Further reorganisation ===
Later restructuring saw Arriva Southern Counties take responsibility for:

- Arriva Guildford & West Surrey
- Arriva West Sussex
- Arriva Southend
- Arriva Kent Thameside

Meanwhile, most of Arriva Croydon & North Surrey was transferred to Arriva London, the group's dedicated London bus division.

=== Sale of Arriva Colchester ===
On 12 October 2026, following a detailed review of its operations, Arriva announced the sale of its Colchester bus depot, along with the fleet and assets to First Bus, with operations ceasing at the end of service on 19 December 2026.

== Key developments timeline ==
- 2001: Crawley depot was sold to Metrobus.
- 2001: The Merstham depot was closed.
- 2004: Arriva Colchester was sold to Tellings-Golden Miller.
- 2007: Arriva Colchester returned to Arriva ownership, but not under Arriva Southern Counties.
- 2009: The Horsham depot was sold to Metrobus.
- 2015: Arriva acquired Network Colchester and Network Harlow from Tellings-Golden Miller, rebranding them as Arriva Colchester and Arriva Harlow.
- 2021: Sheerness depot was closed, with routes 360, 361, and 367 taken over by Chalkwell Coaches.
- 2021: Routes 306 and 308 were withdrawn from Northfleet and taken over by Redroute Buses.
- 2021: Guildford depot was closed, ending Arriva's Surrey operations; routes were transferred to Stagecoach South.
- 2024: Fastrack routes were transferred to Go-Ahead London.
- 2025: Route 477 was withdrawn from Northfleet and taken over by Kent Country.
- 2026: Route 414 was withdrawn from Northfleet and taken over by Kent Country. Arriva Colchester sold to First Bus following a detailed review of its operations.

== Operations ==
Arriva Southern Counties operates a mix of local, interurban, and contracted bus services across Kent, Essex, and parts of Hertfordshire. Its divisions include:

- Arriva Kent & Sussex: Operates in Maidstone, Tunbridge Wells, Tonbridge, Sevenoaks, and Tenterden.
- Arriva Kent Thameside: Serves Dartford, Gravesend, and Northfleet from its Northfleet depot, running commercial and tendered services.
- Arriva Medway Towns: Covers Chatham, Gillingham, and formerly Sittingbourne, with a £10 million network upgrade branded as Operation Overdrive.
- Arriva Southend: Provides localized services in Southend-on-Sea, Rayleigh, Hadleigh, Rochford, and Shoeburyness.
- Arriva Colchester: Operates local services in Colchester. Due to close in December 2026, following sale of the depot to First Bus.

=== Depots ===
==== Current depots ====
- Colchester (Arriva Colchester)
- Gillingham (Arriva Medway Towns)
- Maidstone (Arriva Kent & Sussex)
- Northfleet (Arriva Kent Thameside): Operates commercial and tendered services in Dartford, Gravesend, and surrounding areas.
- Tunbridge Wells (Arriva Kent & Sussex)
- Southend (Arriva Southend)

==== Former depots ====
- Crawley (sold to Metrobus)
- Merstham (closed 2001)
- Horsham (sold to Metrobus)
- Guildford (closed 2021)
- Sheerness (closed 2021)

== Gallery ==
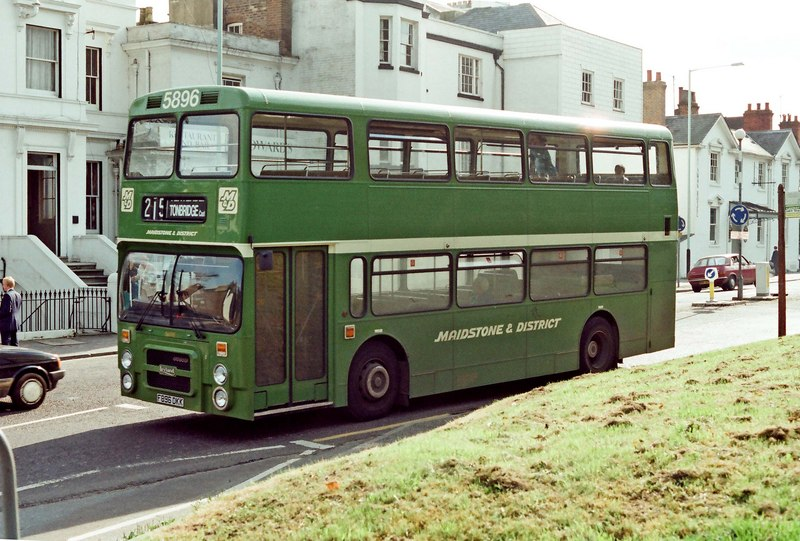
Maidstone & District Leyland Olympian in 1988.

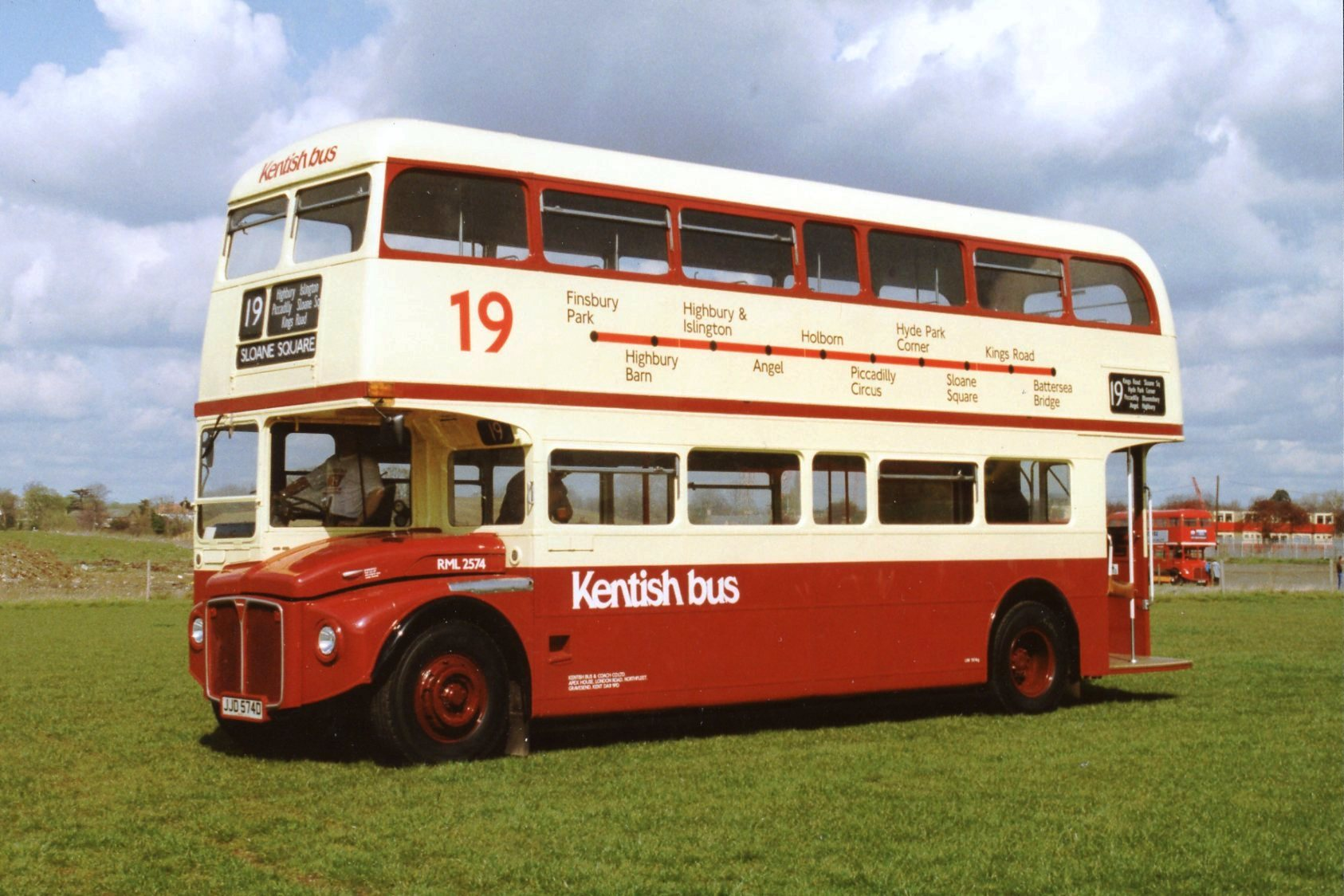
Kentish Bus AEC Routemaster, at the Eastbourne bus rally in 1993.

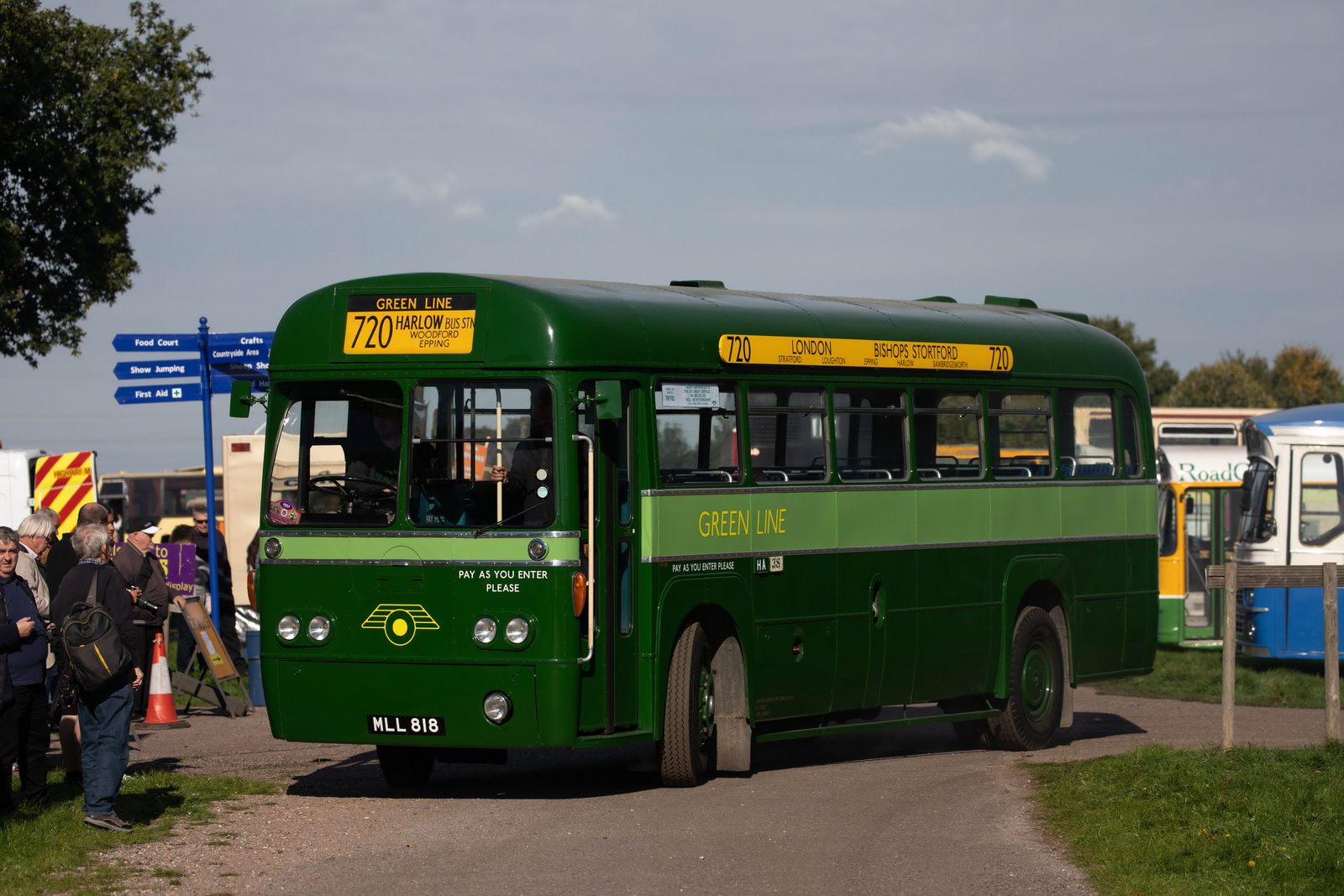
London Country Green Line Metro-Cammell bodied AEC Regal IV in 2022.

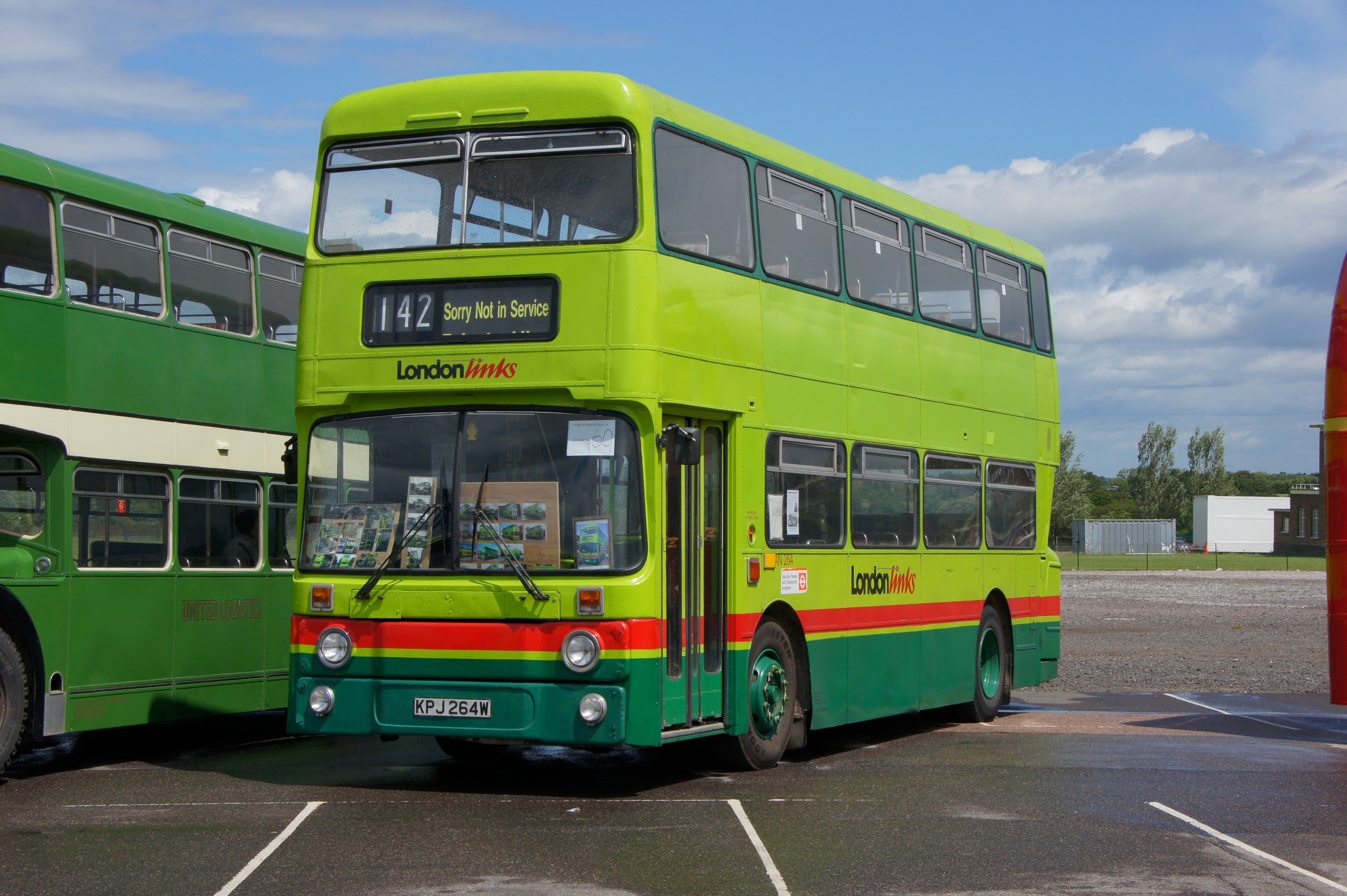
Londonlinks Roe bodied Leyland Atlantean at the 2012 North Weald Bus Rally in 2012.

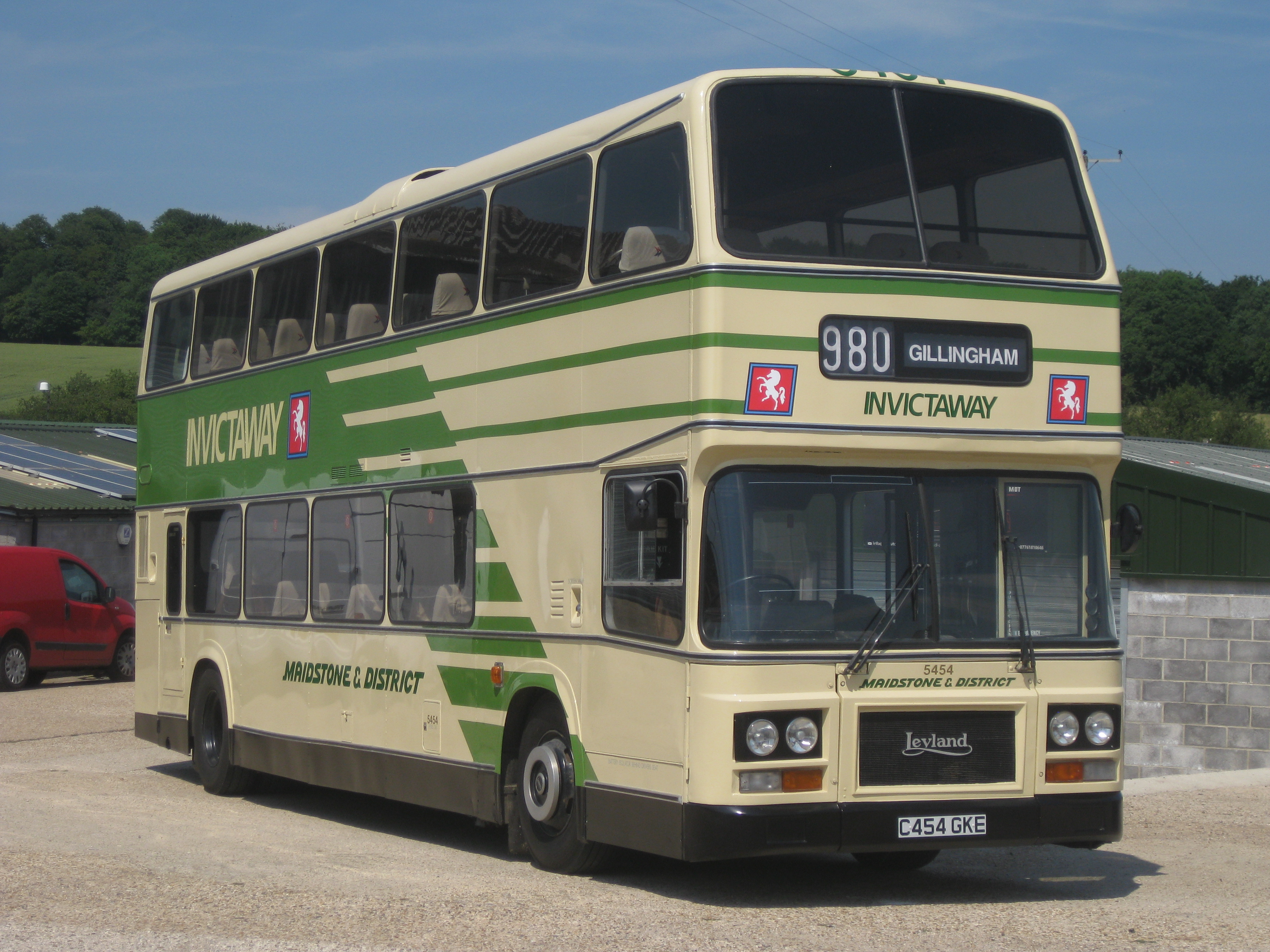
Invictaway ECW bodied Leyland Olympian in 2017.

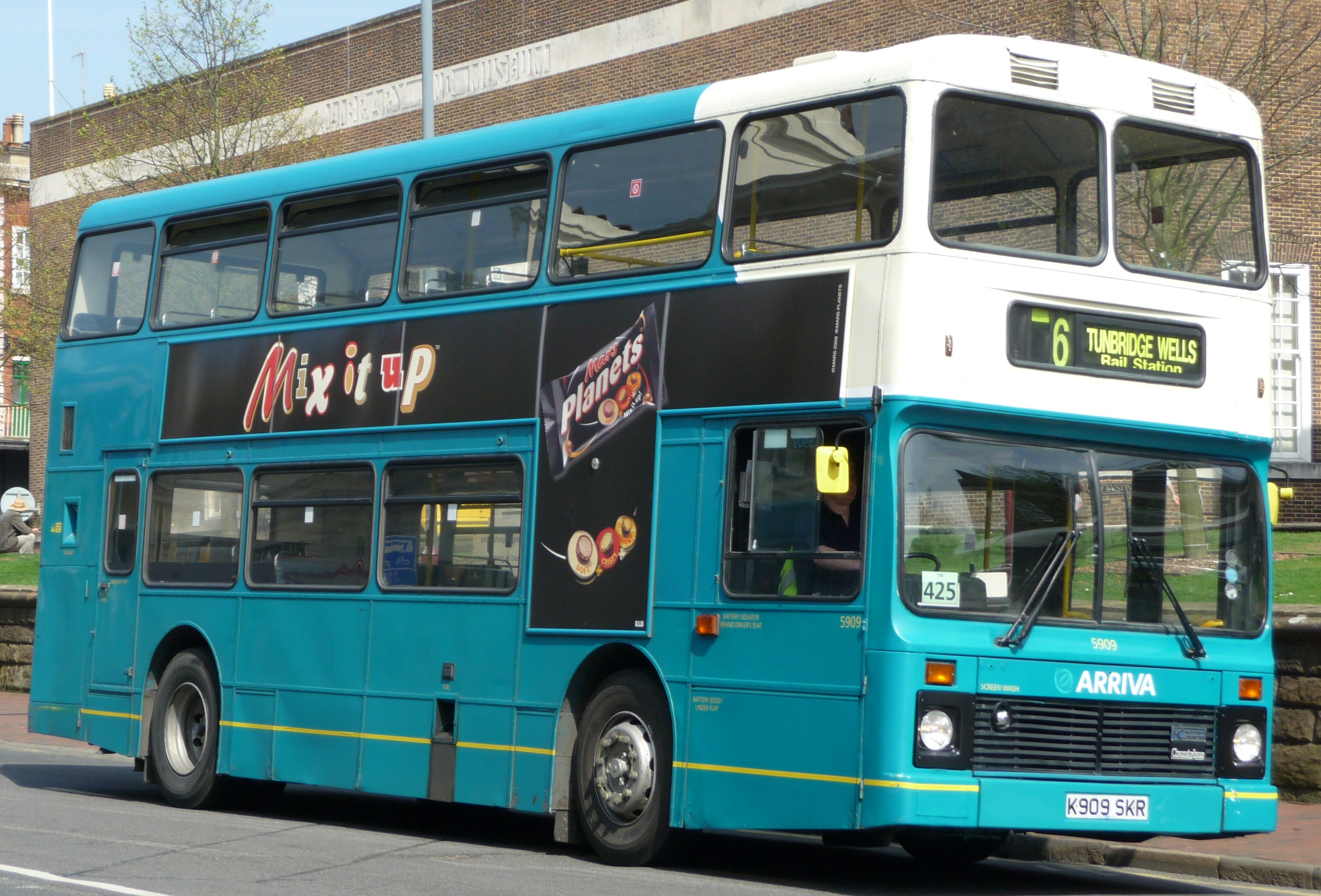
Arriva Kent & Sussex Northern Counties Palatine 1 bodied Leyland Olympian in 2009.

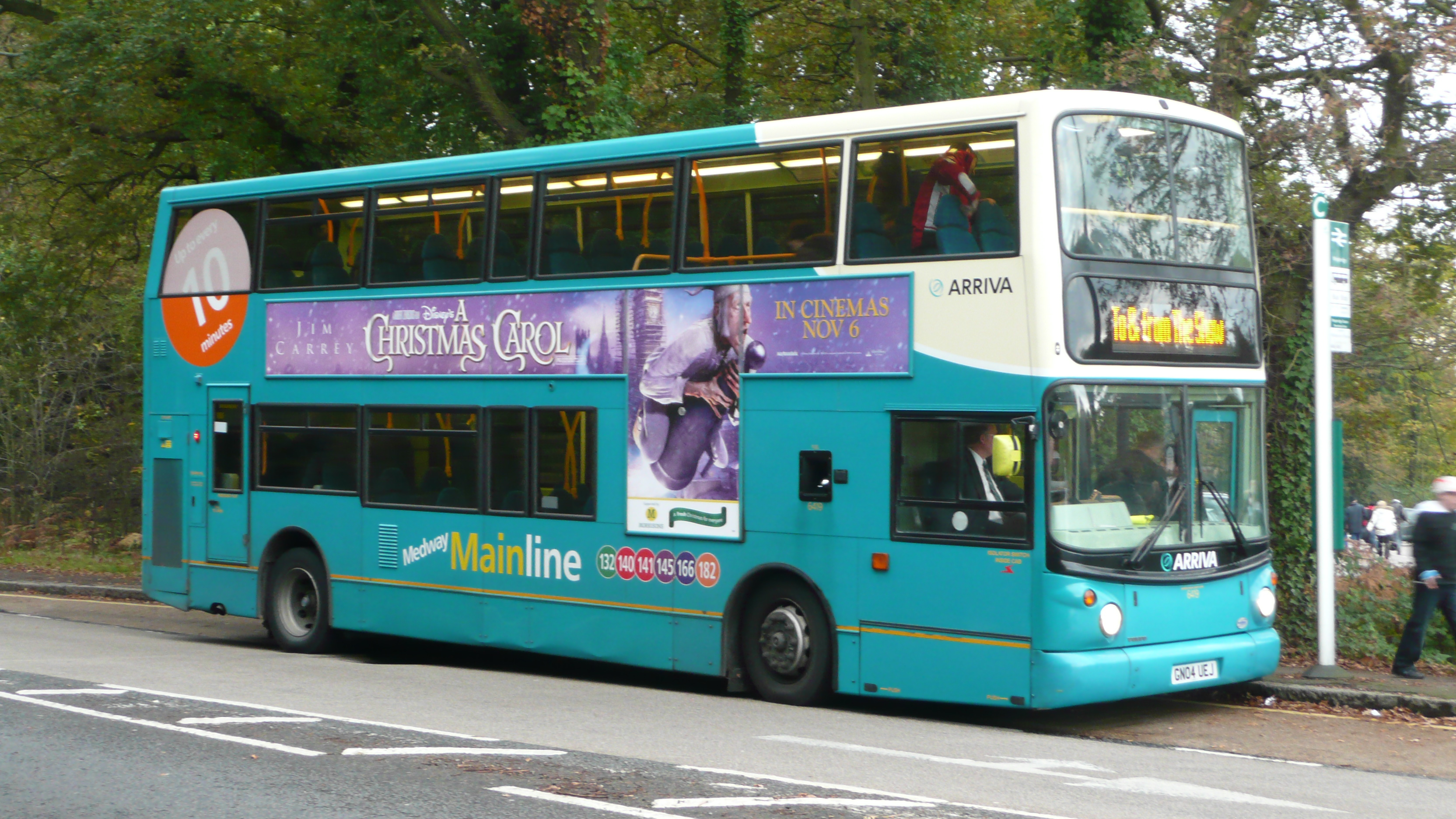
Arriva Medway Towns TransBus ALX400 bodied Volvo B7TL. The bus was part of Operation Overdrive in 2004.

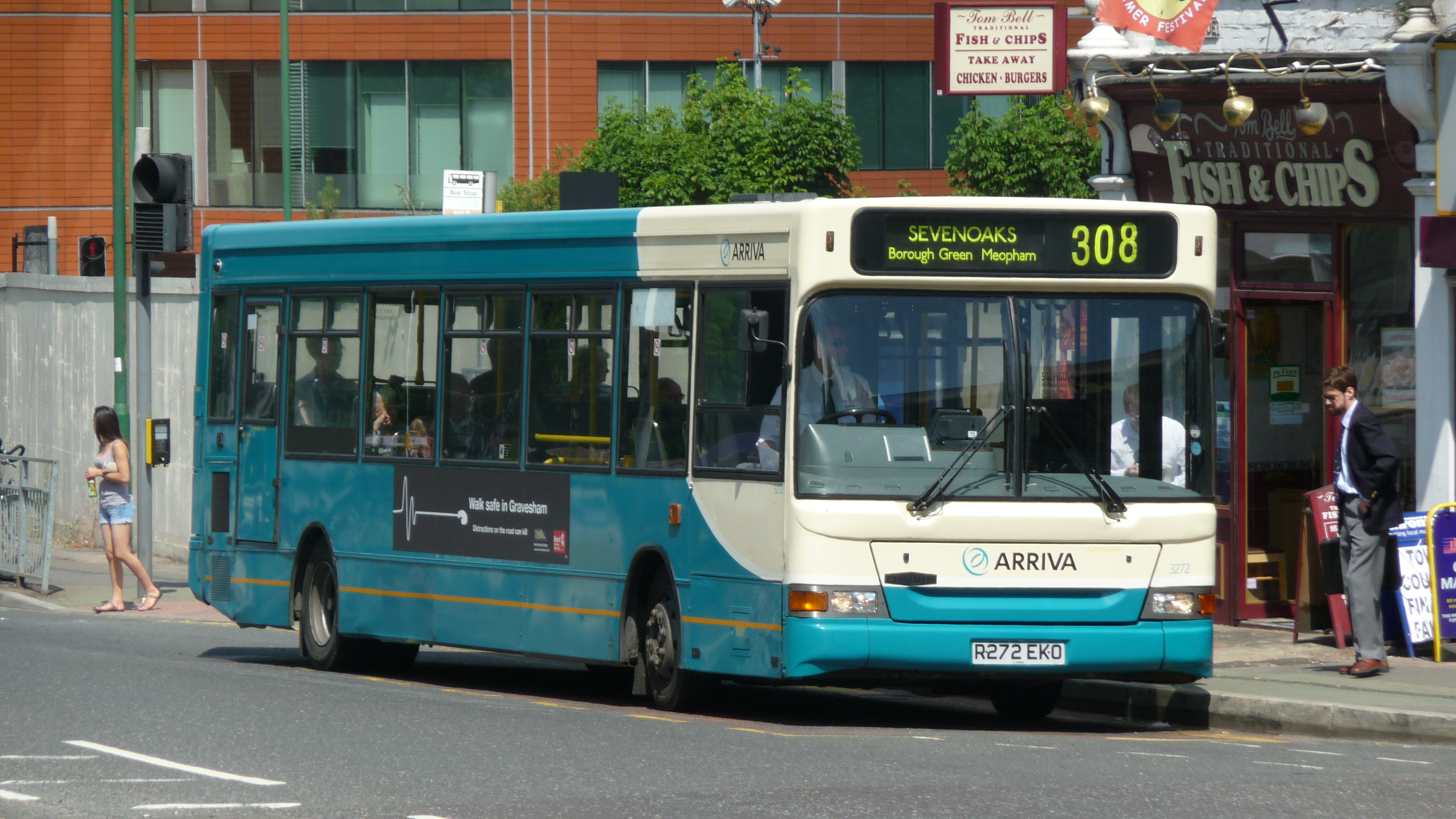
Arriva Kent Thameside Plaxton Pointer 2 bodied Dennis Dart SLF in 2009.

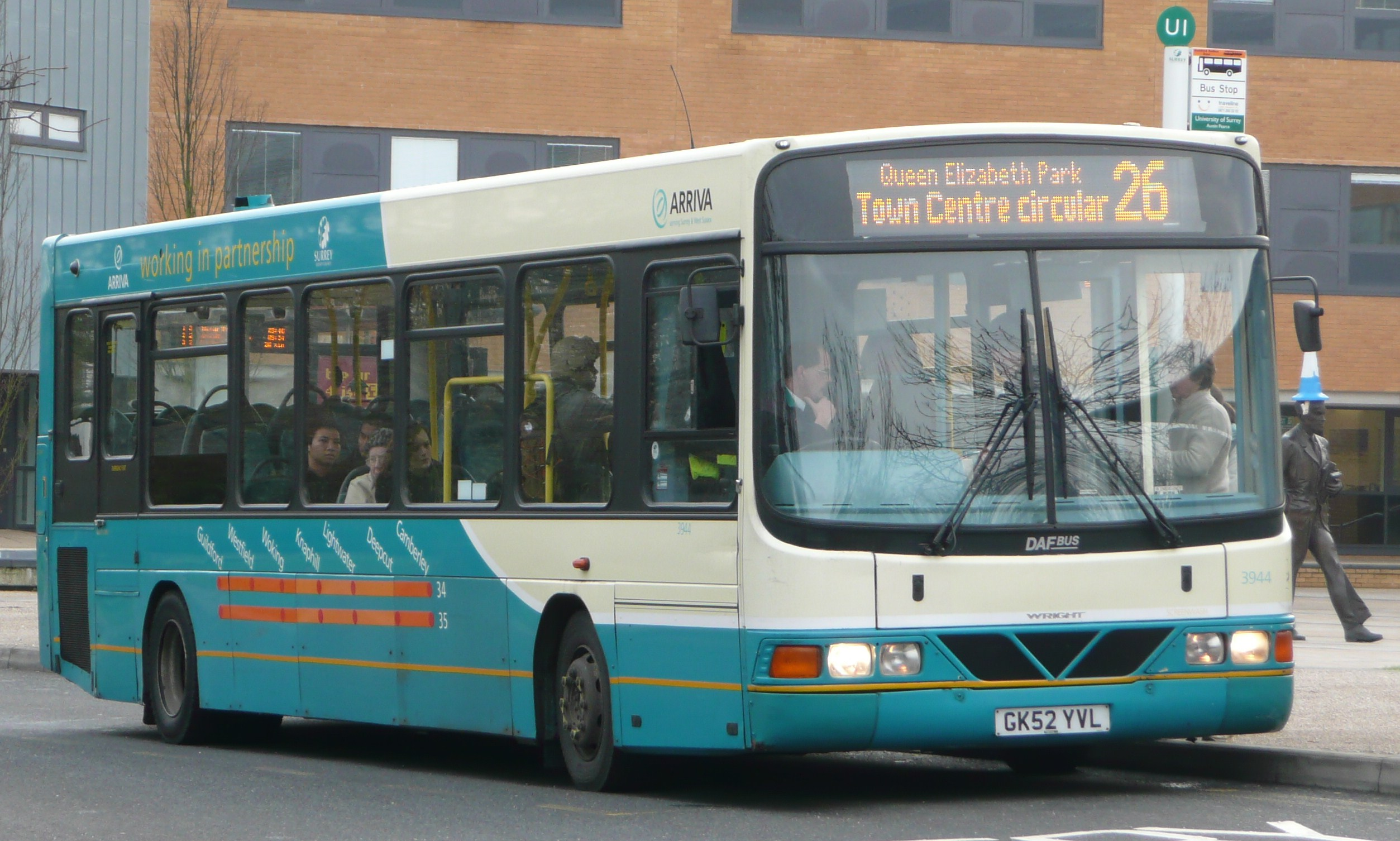
Arriva Guildford & West Surrey Wright Cadet bodied DAF SB120 in 2009.

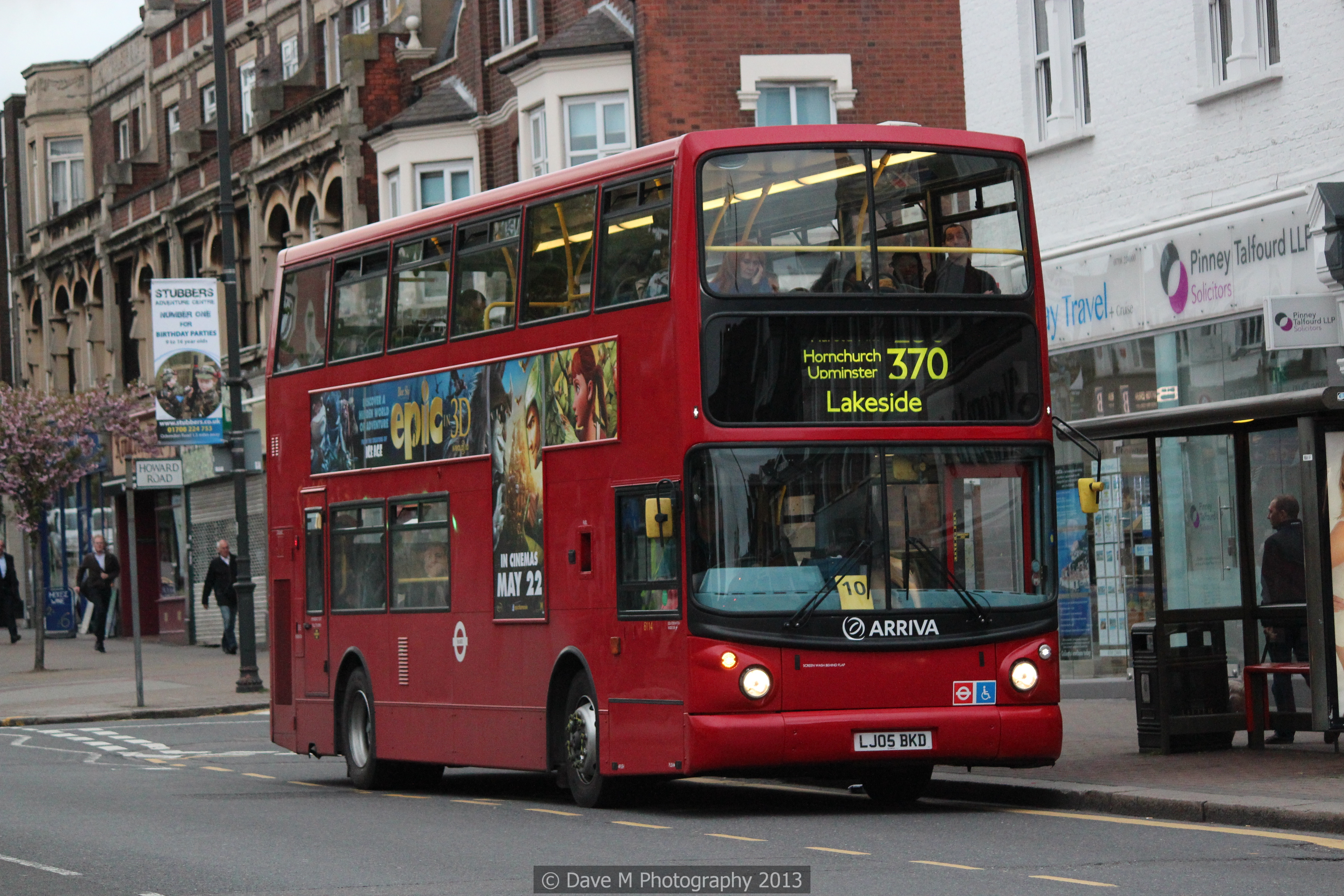
Arriva Southend Alexander ALX400 bodied Volvo B7TL in 2013.

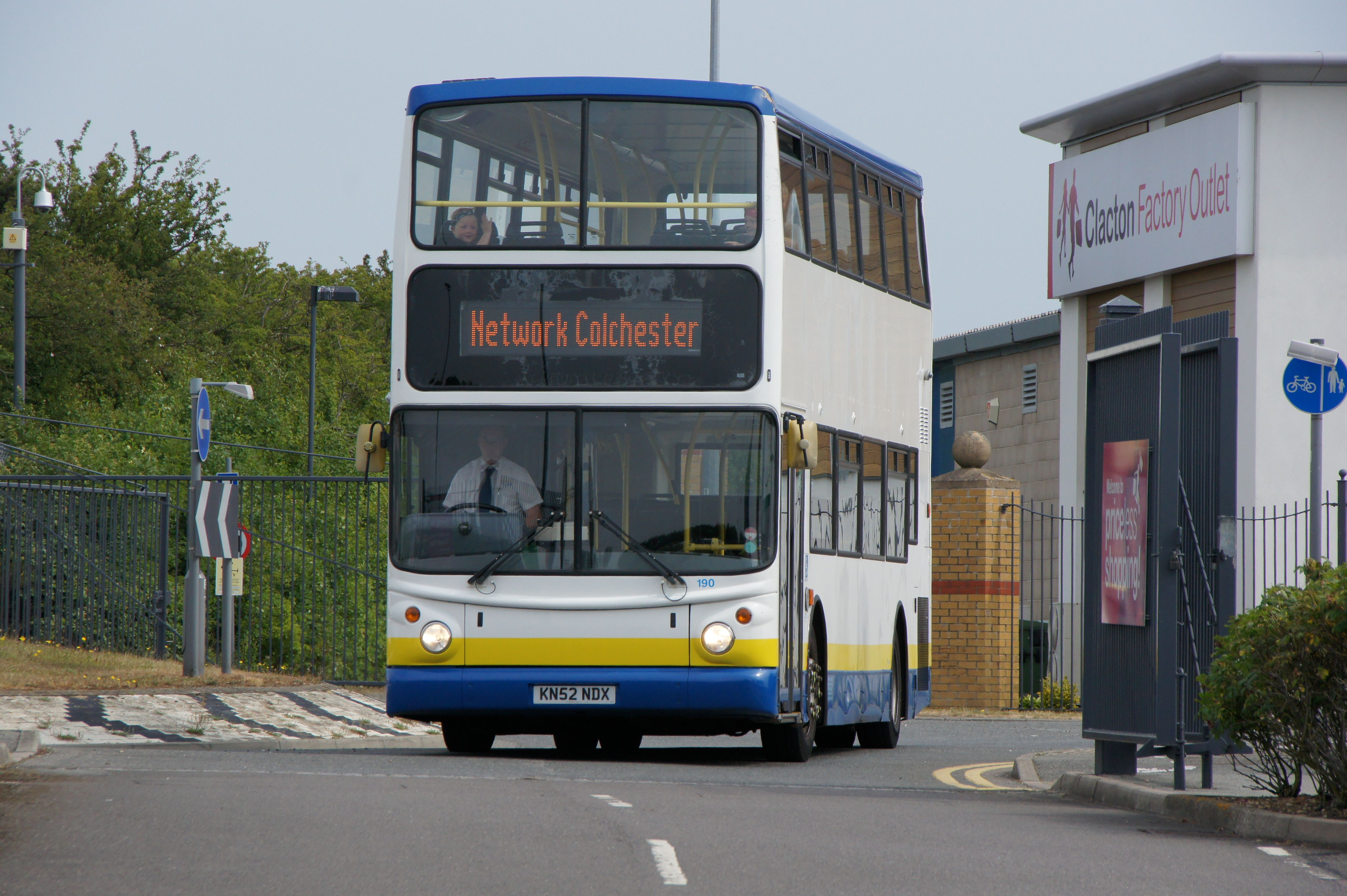
Network Colchester Alexander ALX400 bodied Dennis Trident 2 in 2011.

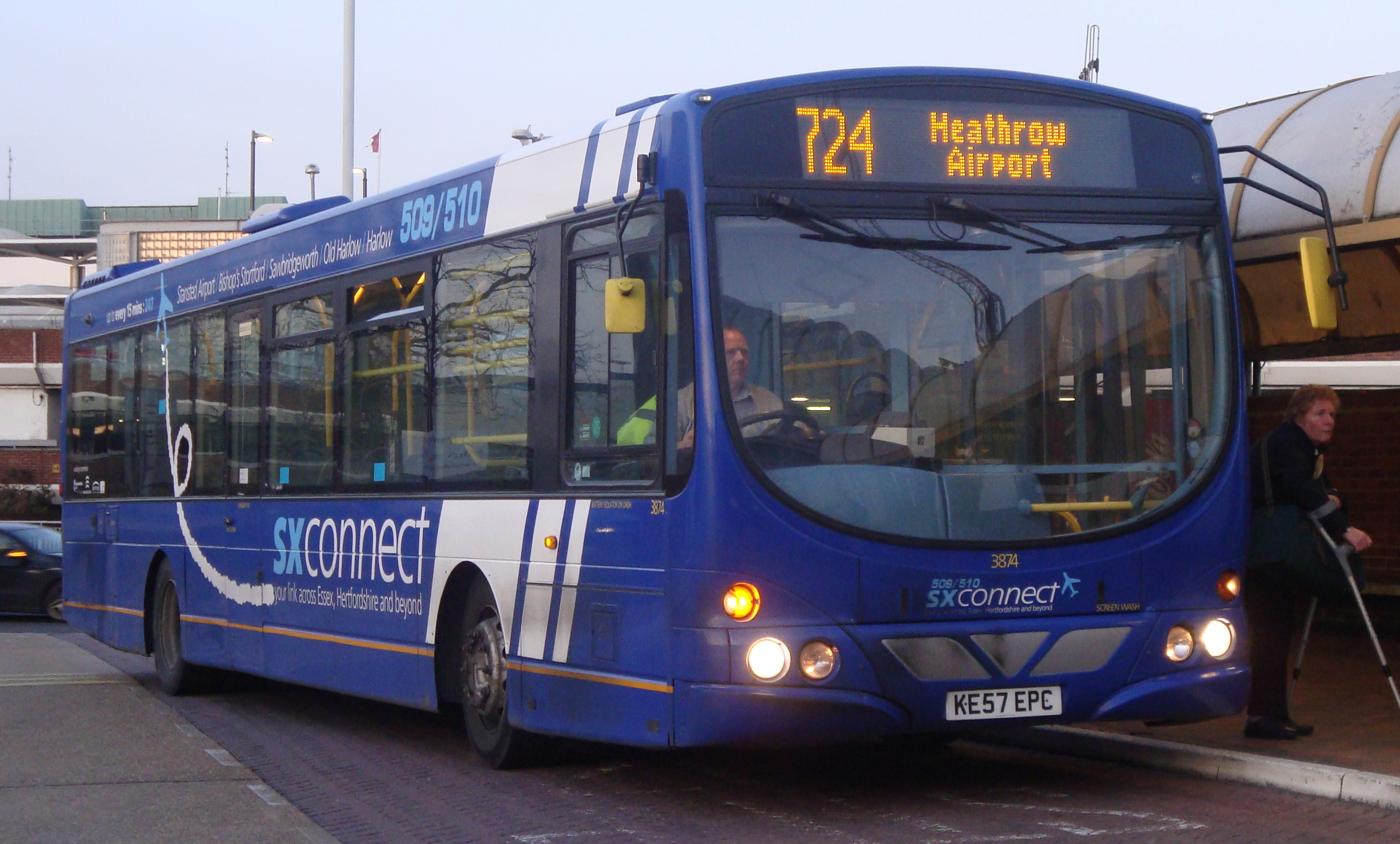
Network Harlow (Arriva-TGM) Wright Eclipse Urban bodied Volvo B7RLE at Heathrow Central Bus Station in 2014.

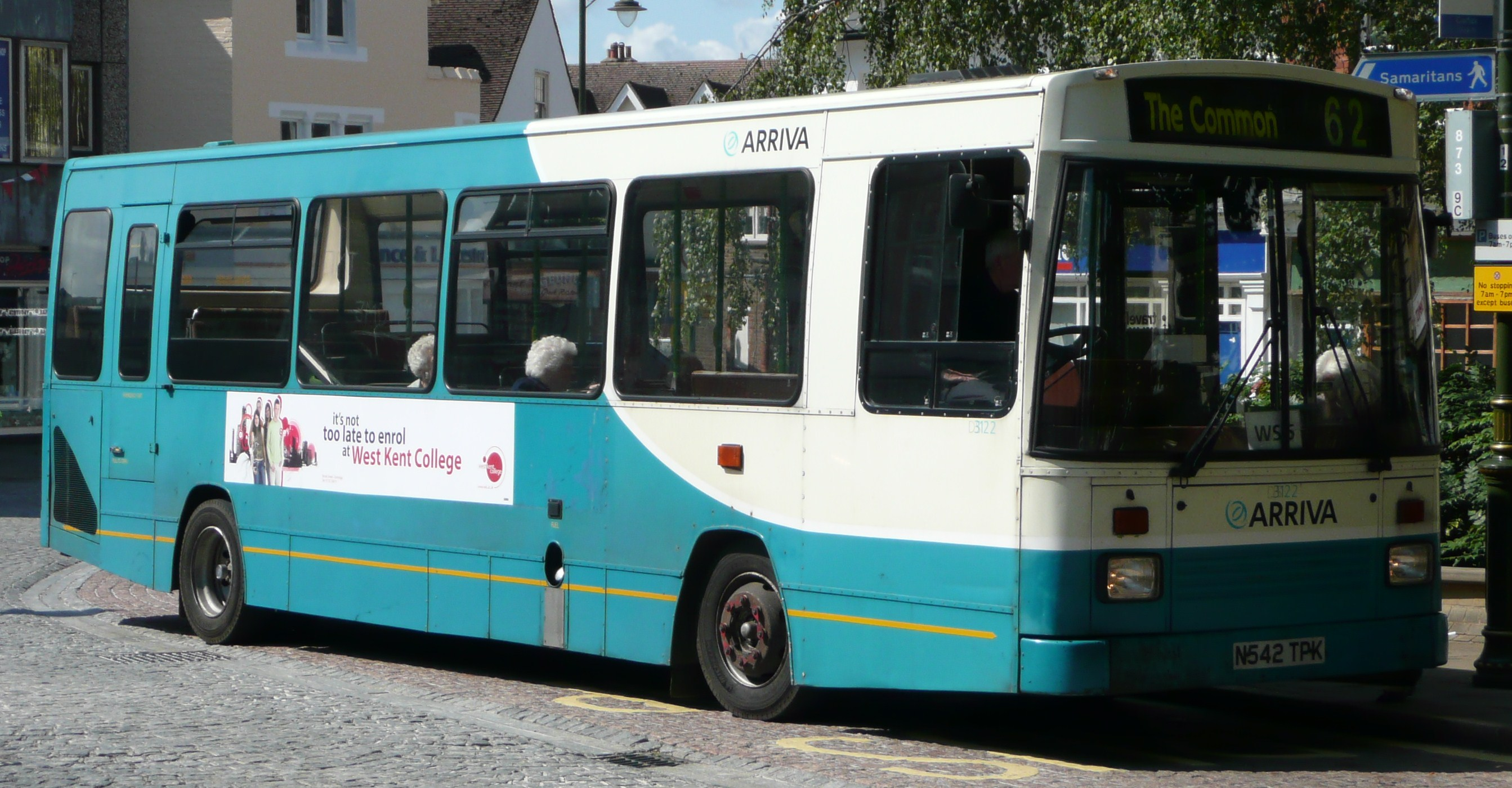
Arriva Guildford & West Surrey East Lancs EL2000 bodied Dennis Dart in 2008.

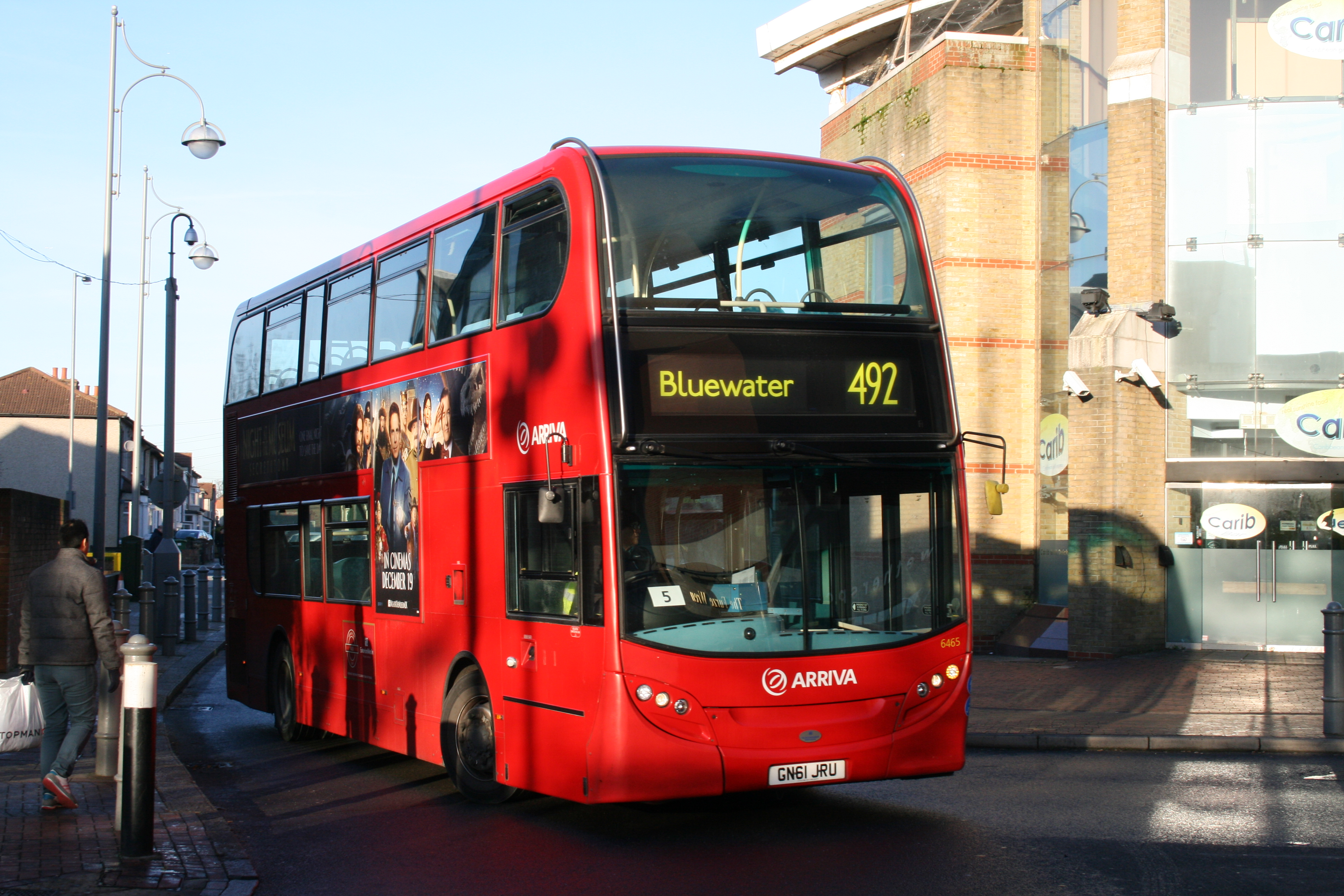
Arriva Southern Counties Alexander Dennis Enviro400 in 2014.
