= Operation Overdrive (transportation) =

Public transportation plan for the Medway Towns, Kent, England

Operation Overdrive is the name of a series of improvement programmes carried out by Arriva in their UK bus operations. The original Operation Overdrive was done by Arriva Southern Counties in the Medway Towns (Kent) in 2004, with further operations occurring in Maidstone (Kent), Merseyside, Leicestershire, County Durham, and Southend-on-Sea (Essex).

== Medway Towns ==
The original Operation Overdrive for the Medway Towns involved the purchase of 61 new buses, upgrading 40 existing buses, upgrades to the route network, introducing GPS bus tracking and brand new interactive timetables for every bus stop, depot upgrades including a vehicle wash, and introduction of a yellow liveried school fleet.

=== New buses ===
External image
- A Transbus ALX400 bodied Volvo B7TL in colour branded livery in 2005

The new vehicles were 12 Dennis Dart 8.8 m-long (29 ft) single deckers with Plaxton Pointer MPD bodies and 49 Volvo B7TL double deckers with TransBus ALX400 bodies. The new buses feature interior, linked to GPS tracking systems provided by Medway Council used for real time display at bus stops.

=== Existing fleet upgrade ===
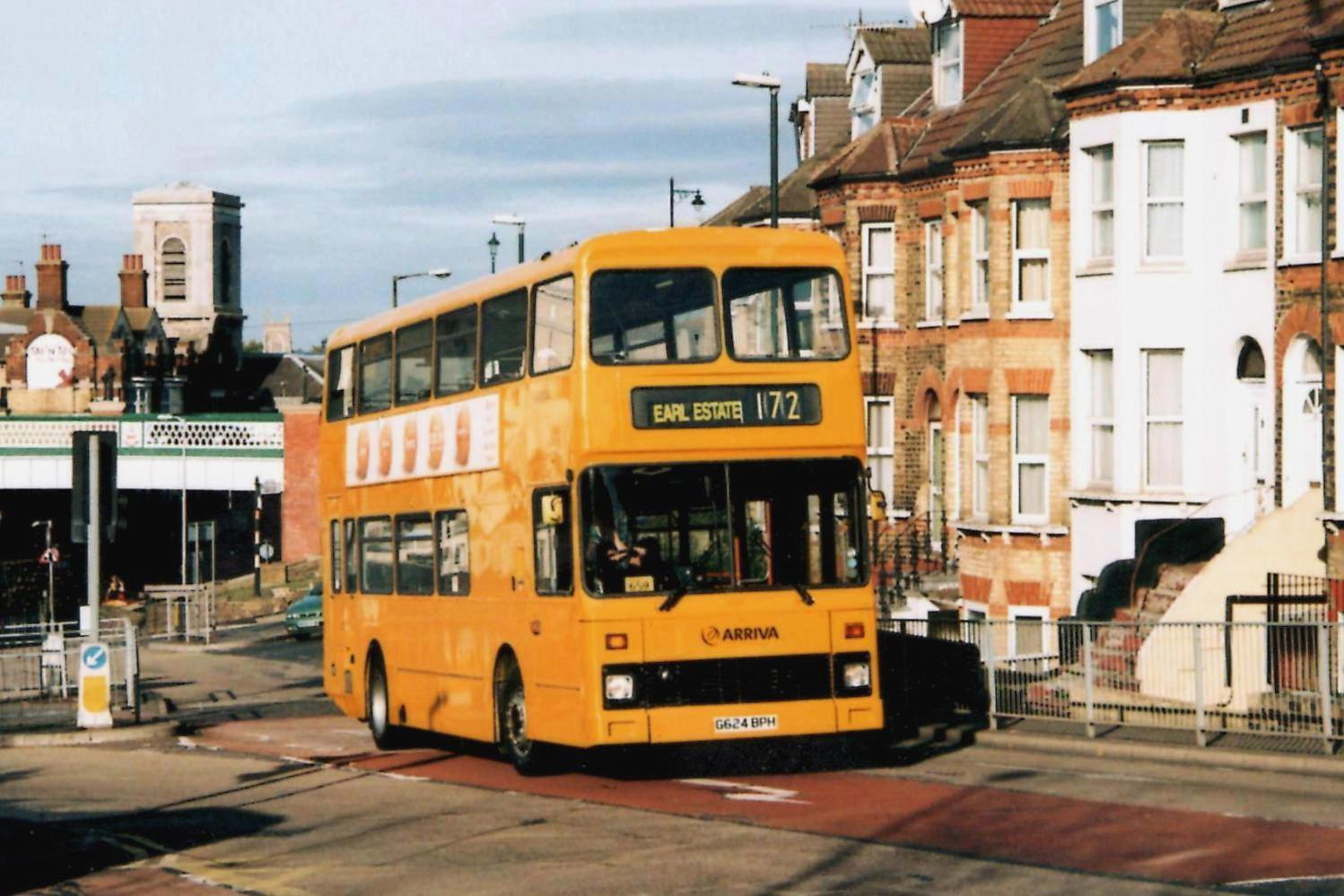
A Northern Counties Palatine 1 bodied Volvo B10M in "yellow school" livery in normal passenger service in 2009

Other existing vehicles in the Medway fleet were modernised to bring them into line with the new vehicles. This entailed refurbishment and repainting, fitting CCTV, changing destination displays from traditional roller blinds to scrolling LED displays and the introduction of GPS tracking systems to all vehicles. Six Northern Counties Palatine 1 bodied Volvo B10M buses were also painted in an allover yellow scheme for use on school services.

=== Network upgrade ===
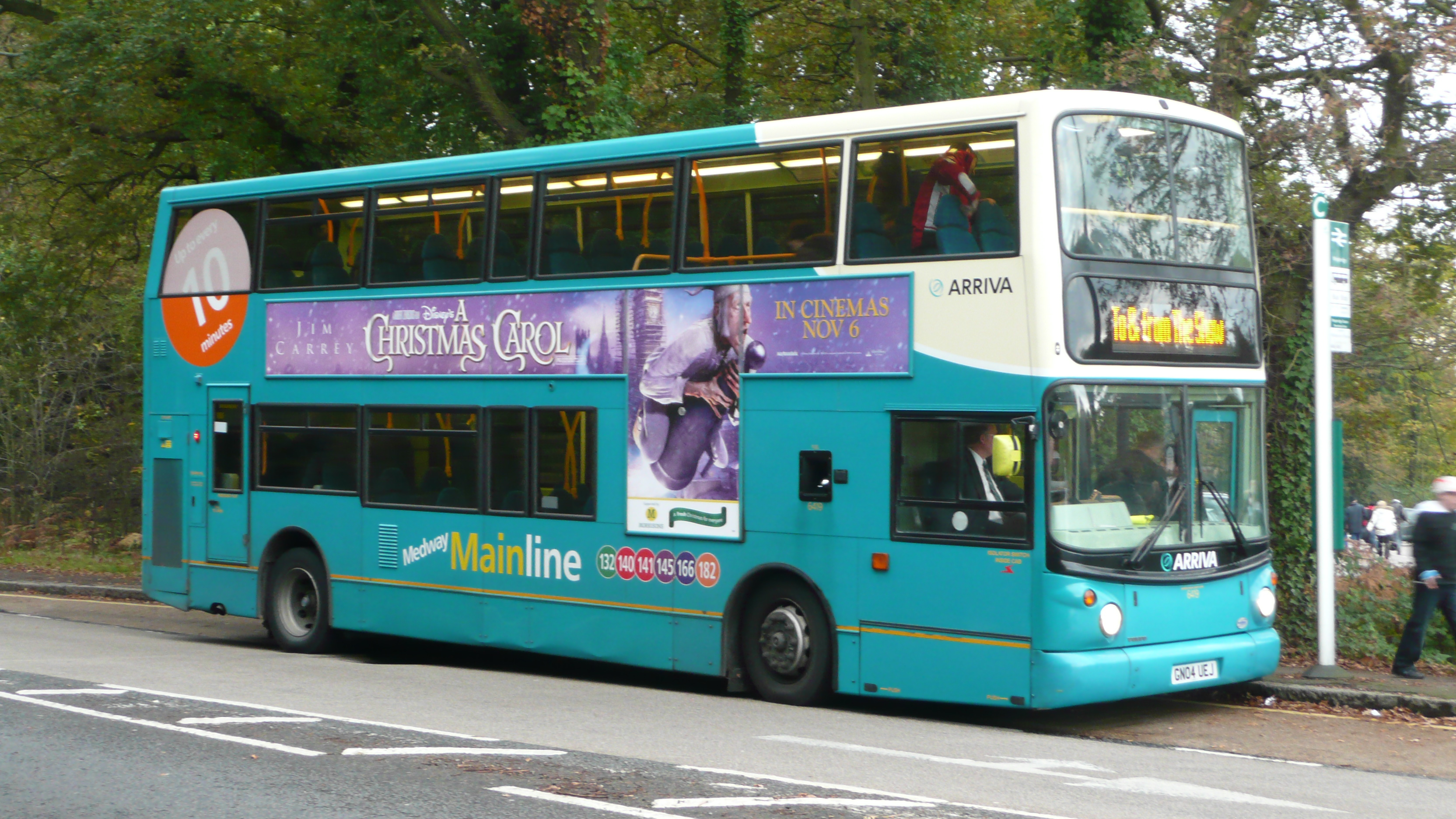
A TransBus ALX400 bodied Volvo B7TL in "Medway Mainline" livery in 2009

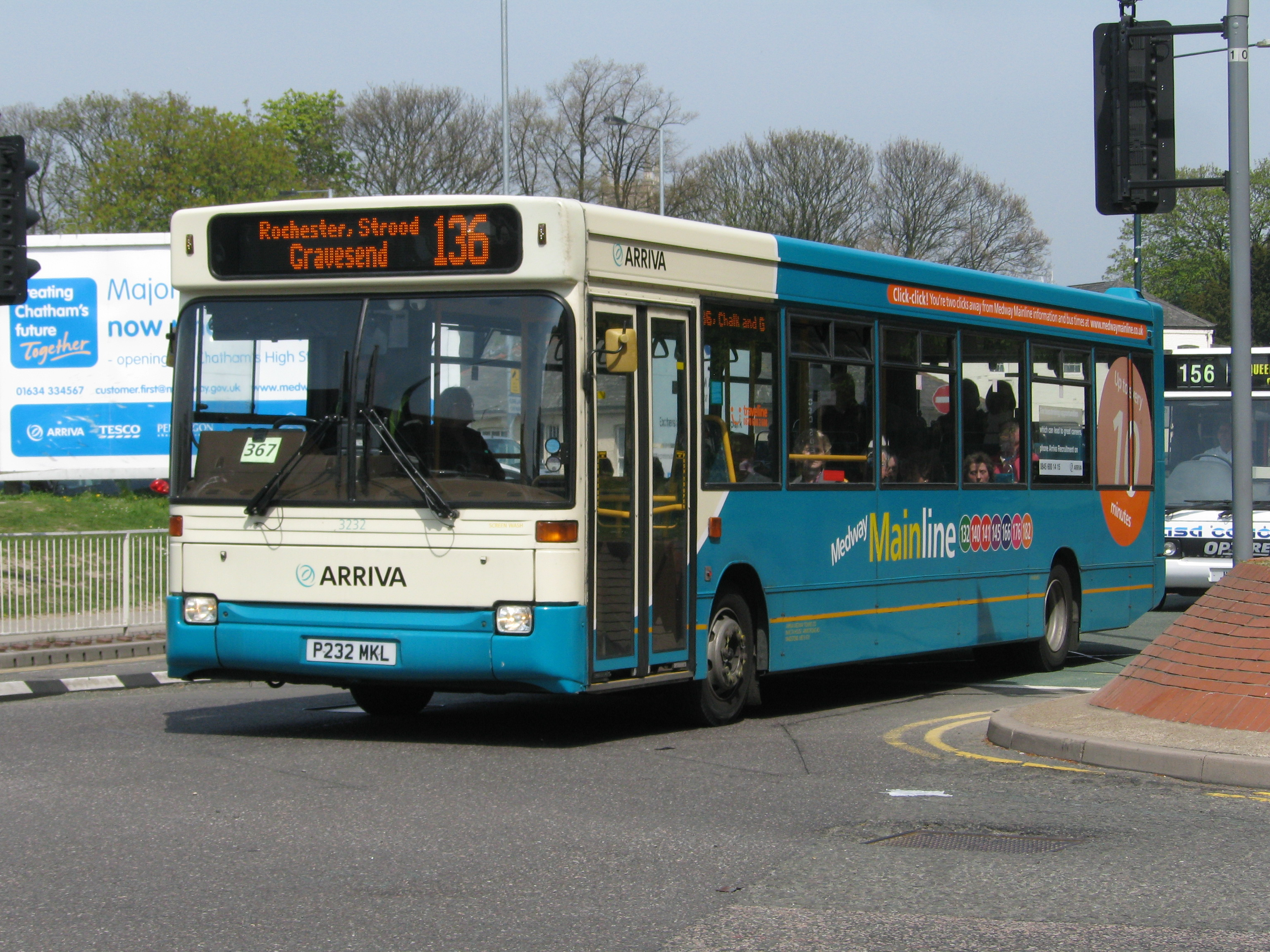
A Plaxton Pointer 1 bodied Dennis Dart SLF in "Medway Mainline" livery in 2010

Arriva significantly upgraded services in the Medway area with the rebranding and timetabling of routes and the introduction of new buses. The network was upgraded with five routes being increased to 10-minute frequencies and branded as the Red, Green, Purple, Blue and Orange Lines, with appropriately branded buses allocated to these routes. All but the purple line use double deck buses.

The specific colour branding of buses to a particular coloured line was later dropped in favour of a single Medway Mainline branding showing all of the coloured route numbers.

=== Launch day ===
On the day of the new network launch, a convoy of 20 of the new buses was organised for the press, running from the depot at Gillingham to the Historic Dockyard in Chatham.

== Maidstone ==
Overdrive 2 involved the refurbishment of several buses at the Maidstone depot in 2004/5. In 2008, four VDL DB250/East Lancs Myllennium Lowlander have arrived for route 71.

== County Durham ==
In 2005 some new Alexander ALX400/Volvo B7TLs and 14 Scania CN94UB Omnicitys were introduced in Durham and Darlington. Most vehicles have since been moved elsewhere.

== North West ==
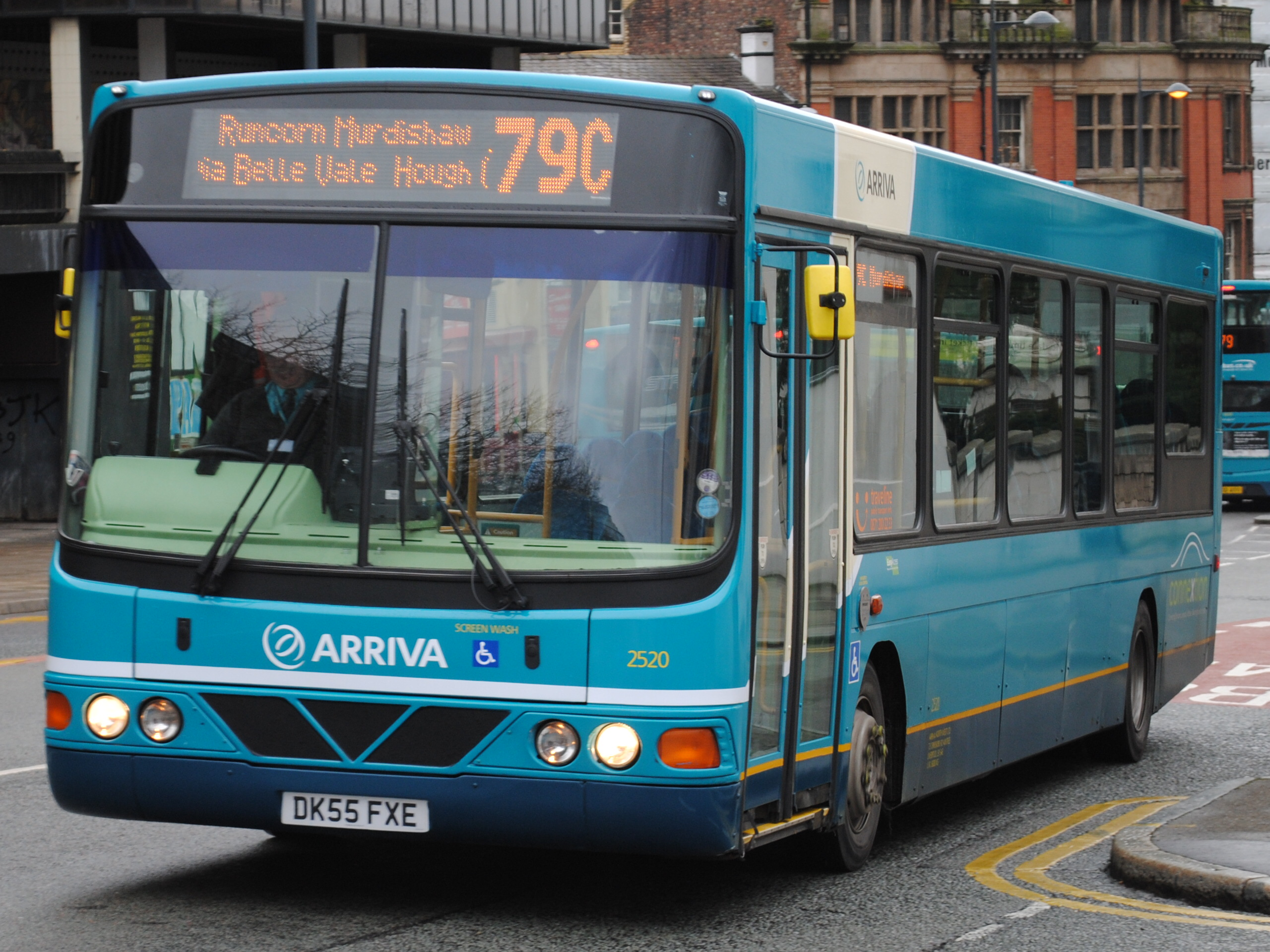
An Arriva North West Wright Cadet delivered as part of Operation Overdrive in Liverpool in 2013

Between 2005 and 2006, 42 Wright Cadet midibuses were delivered to Runcorn (39) and Speke (three) depots, with Runcorn's receiving Strider branding. Fleet investment continued in 2006, with the company ordering 30 Volvo B7TLs and 28 Wright Commanders for its Speke depot, whilst Green Lane depot received six Commanders. A second batch of Commanders, for Southport and Wythenshawe depots, was delivered in 2007.

Arriva North West purchased a total of 231 Wright Pulsar/Pulsar 2s for the majority of its North West depots between 2008 and 2011, with 68 of these being allocated to Green Lane depot. Other depots which received brand new Pulsars include Birkenhead, Bootle, Southport and St Helens. The Pulsar soon became Arriva North West's standard vehicle type, primarily replacing vehicles which had been acquired from the takeovers of MTL and North Western.

In 2009, 35 Alexander Dennis Enviro400s were ordered for Cross River Express and Liverpool cross-city services respectively. Two years later, a batch of 47 Wright Gemini 2 was ordered, with the majority of these allocated to Speke depot for routes in south Liverpool.

== Leicestershire ==
In May 2006 Arriva launched Operation Overdrive on services in Leicestershire which saw 54 new buses delivered to Arriva Midlands (Fox County) and numerous buses refurbished. All but eight of the buses were double deckers on VDL DB250 and Volvo B7TL chassis. The eight single deckers delivered were VDL SB200s. All buses delivered were bodied by Wrightbus.

== Southend-on-Sea ==
In July 2008, Arriva Southern Counties sent some of Arriva Southend's Dennis Dart/Plaxton Pointers to their Gillingham, Kent depot for refurbishment, entailing repainting, fitting CCTV, and changing their destination displays from traditional roller blinds to scrolling LED displays. In mid-2009, the remainder of the older double decker fleet will be replaced by low-floor buses.
