= Volvo B7TL =

Low-floor longitudinal double-decker bus chassis

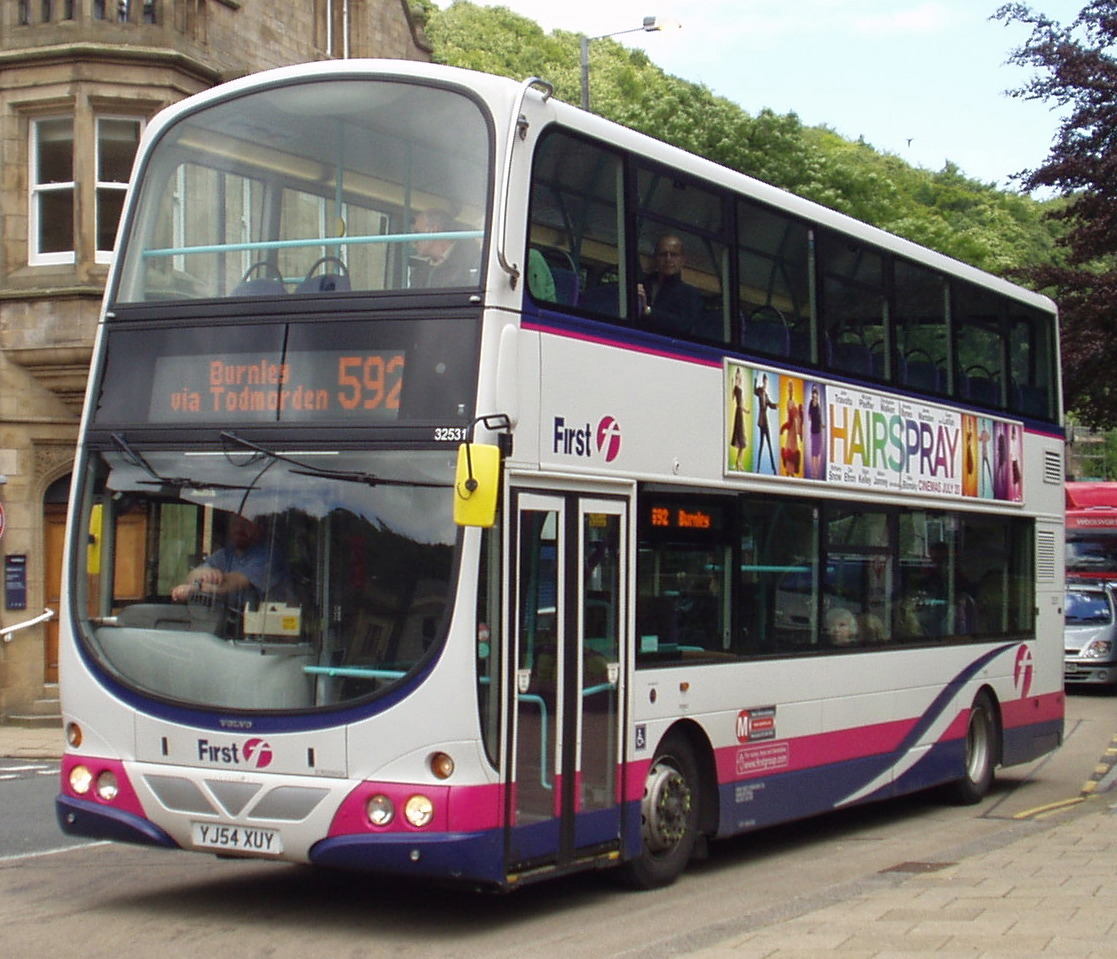
- First West Yorkshire Wright Eclipse Gemini-bodied Volvo B7TL on Hebden Bridge in 2007

Overview
- Manufacturer: Volvo
- Production: 1999–2007

Body and chassis
- Doors: 1 or 2
- Floor type: Low floor

Powertrain
- Engine: Volvo D7C (7.3 L)
- Power output: 215–250 hp (160–186 kW)
- Transmission: Voith DIWA; ZF Ecomat 5HP502C/6HP502C

Chronology
- Predecessor: Volvo Olympian
- Successor: Volvo B9TL (2-Axle)

The Volvo B7TL is a low-floor double-decker bus chassis which was launched in 1999 and replaced the 2-axle version of the Volvo Olympian (its 3-axle version was replaced by the Volvo Super Olympian). It was built as the British bus operators seemed hesitant to purchase the B7L double decker with a long rear overhang (although some have since entered service in Glasgow, Scotland as 12 m long double deckers).

The B7TL chassis was designed by the Leyland Product Developments consultancy based at the Leyland Technical Centre. It was initially built in Irvine, North Ayrshire, Scotland. In 2000, production was gradually transferred to Sweden. In mid-2004, production of the MkII version of the B7TL was started.

Like the Olympian, the B7TL features a transversely-mounted rear engine and a shorter rear overhang, but the radiator was mounted on the right side of the engine compartment. It was equipped with Volvo D7C engine and ZF or Voith gearbox. The B7TL was initially available with Alexander ALX400 and Plaxton President bodywork, later followed by East Lancs Vyking and Myllennium Vyking bodies, and also the Wright Eclipse Gemini.

== Orders ==
=== United Kingdom ===
The Volvo B7TL was highly popular in the United Kingdom, with a large number being purchased by most of the major bus groups such as FirstGroup and Arriva. Travel West Midlands, Travel Coventry and Travel Dundee, part of the National Express Group, purchased over 320 B7TLs from 2000 to 2006, a majority of these being built with Alexander ALX400 bodies, while 112 with Wright Eclipse Gemini bodies and 102 with Plaxton President bodies were also delivered. Translink of Northern Ireland also purchased over 150 B7TLs with Alexander ALX400 bodies for its Ulsterbus and Citybus operations between 2001 and 2006, with the first batch of 20 B7TLs delivered in 2001 marking the return of double-decker buses to Belfast for the first time since 1989.

The chassis was especially popular in London, with a total of 2,014 Volvo B7TLs being built for London's bus operators, most being bodied with Alexander ALX400, Plaxton President, East Lancs Vyking or Wright Eclipse Gemini bodywork. 790 B7TLs were built for Go-Ahead Group companies London General and London Central, while 378 for Arriva London, 308 for Metroline, 278 for First London and 148 for London United were also built. Transport for London noise regulations would put an end to B7TL orders in 2006, and the type was superseded in London by both the Volvo B9TL and the later Volvo B5LH.

Smaller orders from operators outside London include Lothian Buses, who ordered a total of 132 B7TLs, the first seven being delivered with Plaxton President bodywork in 2000, followed by 125 more being delivered with Wright bodies between 2005 and 2006. Arriva UK Bus also ordered small quantities of B7TLs for its operations outside London, including 20 with Alexander ALX400 bodywork and 20 with Plaxton President bodywork for Arriva Yorkshire delivered between 2000 and 2001, 49 ALX400s for Arriva Medway Towns in 2004 as part of Operation Overdrive, and 30 ALX400s for Arriva Merseyside in 2006.

East Yorkshire Motor Services ordered 36 B7TLs with Plaxton President bodywork from 2000 to 2003, six of these being delivered to their Manchester subsidiary Finglands Coachways, before later ordering 18 more B7TLs with Wright bodies from 2005 to 2006. Southern Vectis ordered seven Volvo B7TLs with Plaxton President bodywork at the end of 2001.

The last Volvo B7TLs entered service with First Glasgow with the Wright Eclipse Gemini bodywork in April 2007.

=== Ireland ===
Buses built on the B7TL chassis were also popular with Irish operators Dublin Bus purchasing 648 B7TLs built with Alexander ALX400 bodywork between 2000 and 2007, while Bus Éireann also purchased over twenty B7TLs with East Lancs Myllennium Vyking bodies for services in Cork between 2001 and 2004.

=== South Africa ===
150 Volvo B7TLs with Marcopolo Viale bodywork were delivered to Metrobus of Johannesburg, South Africa in 2002, alongside an order for 50 Marcopolo bodied Volvo B7R single deck buses. These were the first low-floor buses to enter service in South Africa as part of a major company modernisation scheme.

== Gallery ==
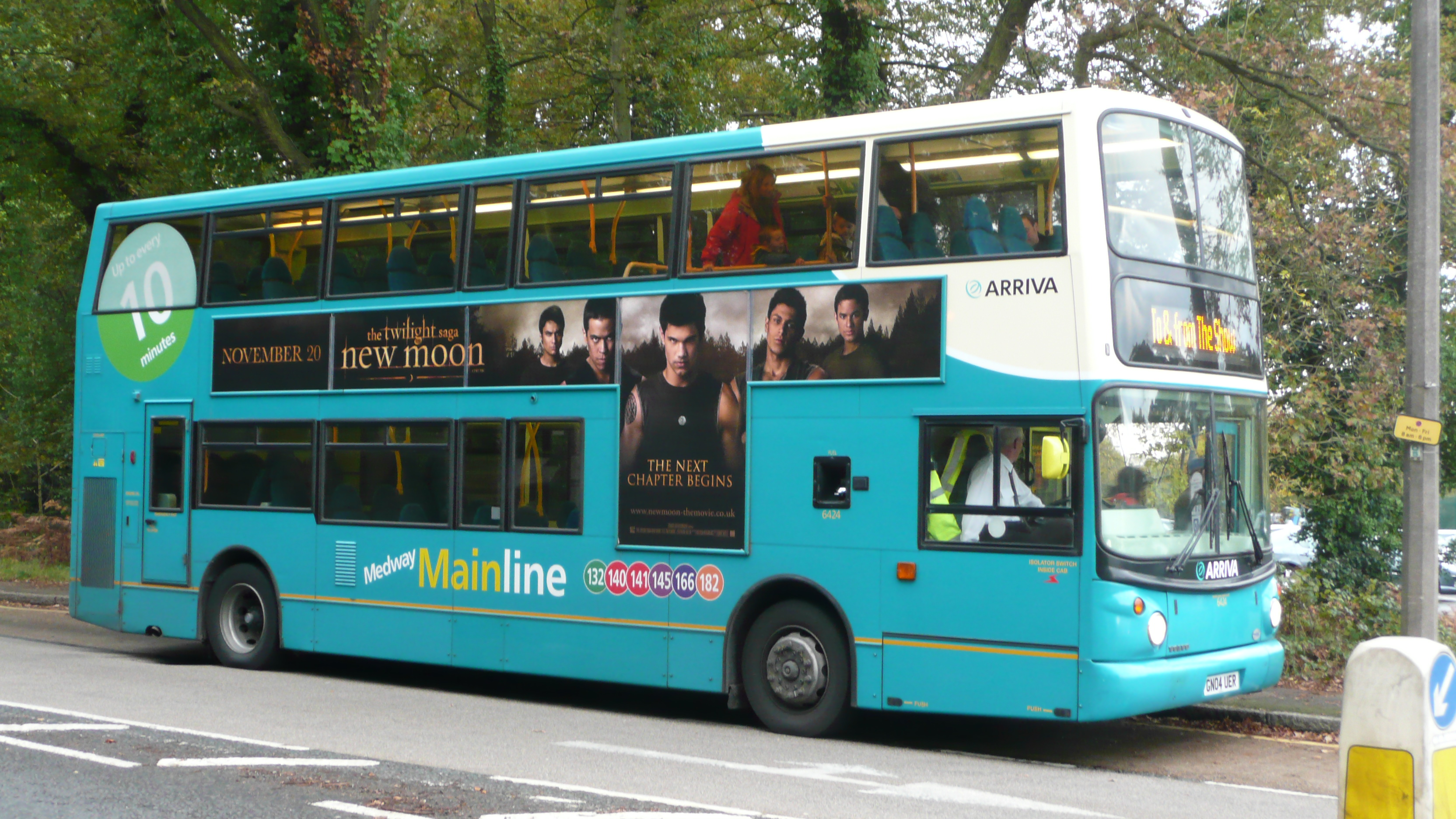
Alexander ALX400-bodied Volvo B7TL owned by Arriva Medway Towns.

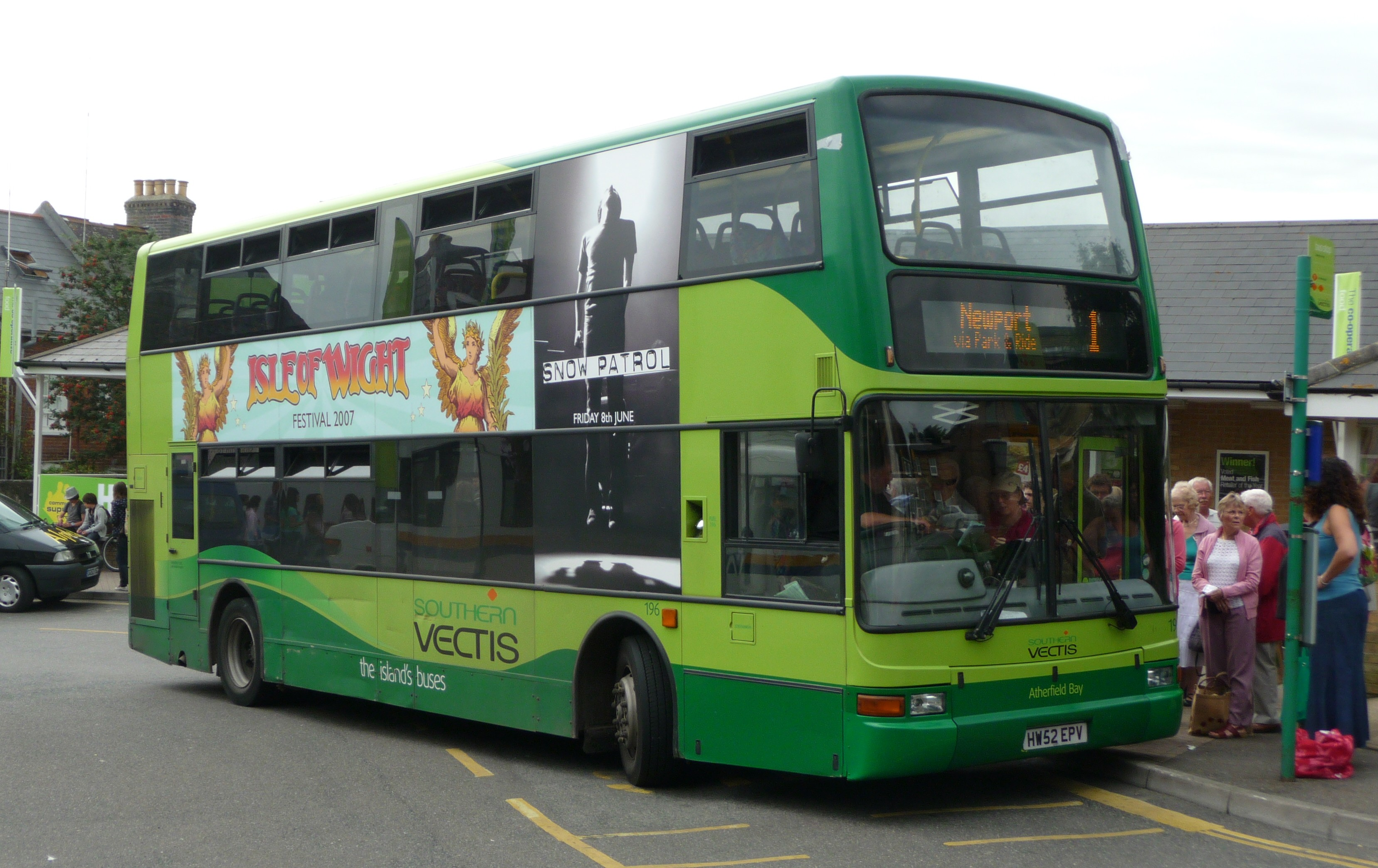
A Southern Vectis Plaxton President-bodied Volvo B7TL in Cowes, Isle of Wight.

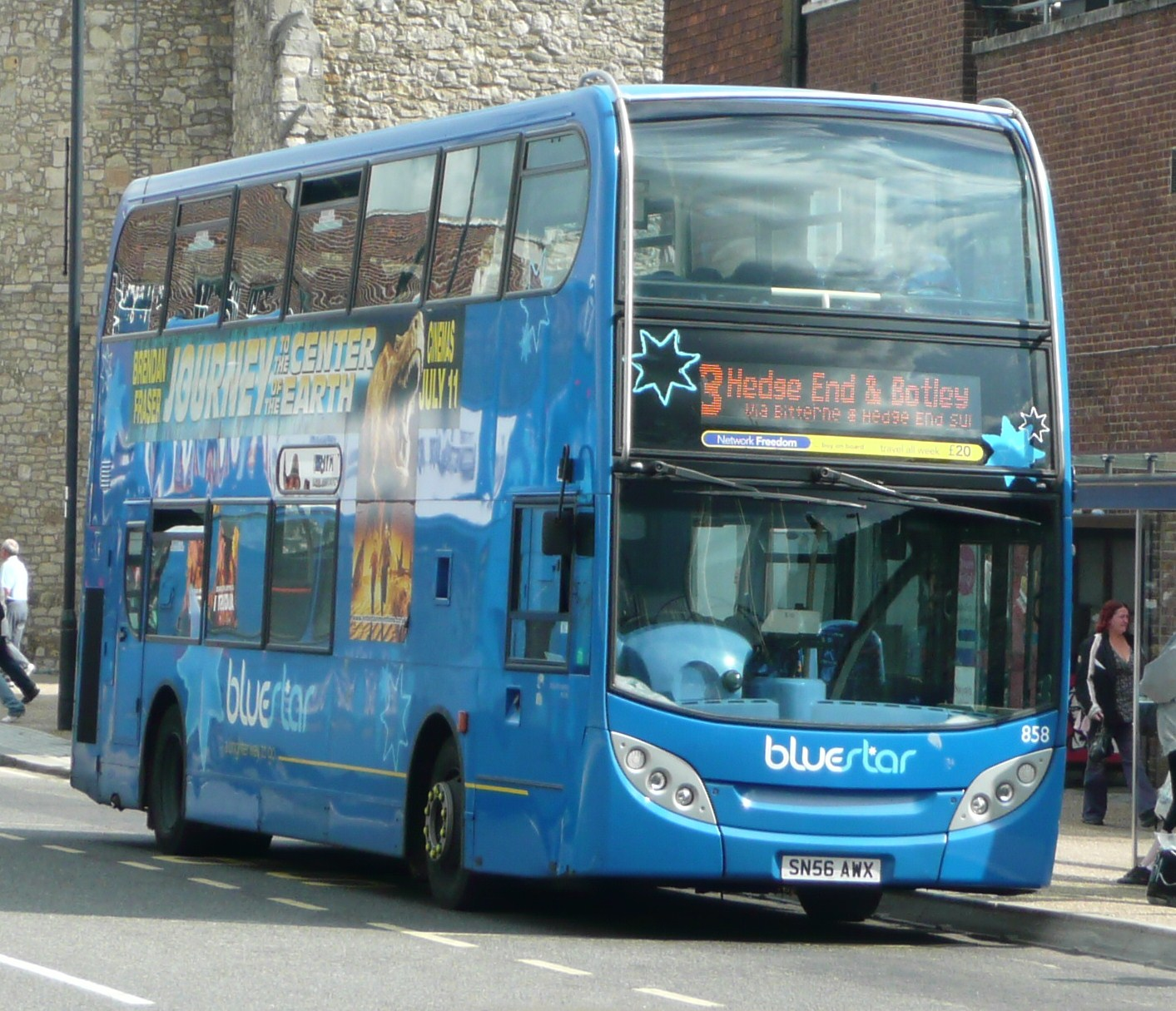
The unique Volvo B7TL/Alexander Dennis Enviro400 owned by Bluestar. All production Enviro / Volvo Buses are on the new B9TL chassis.

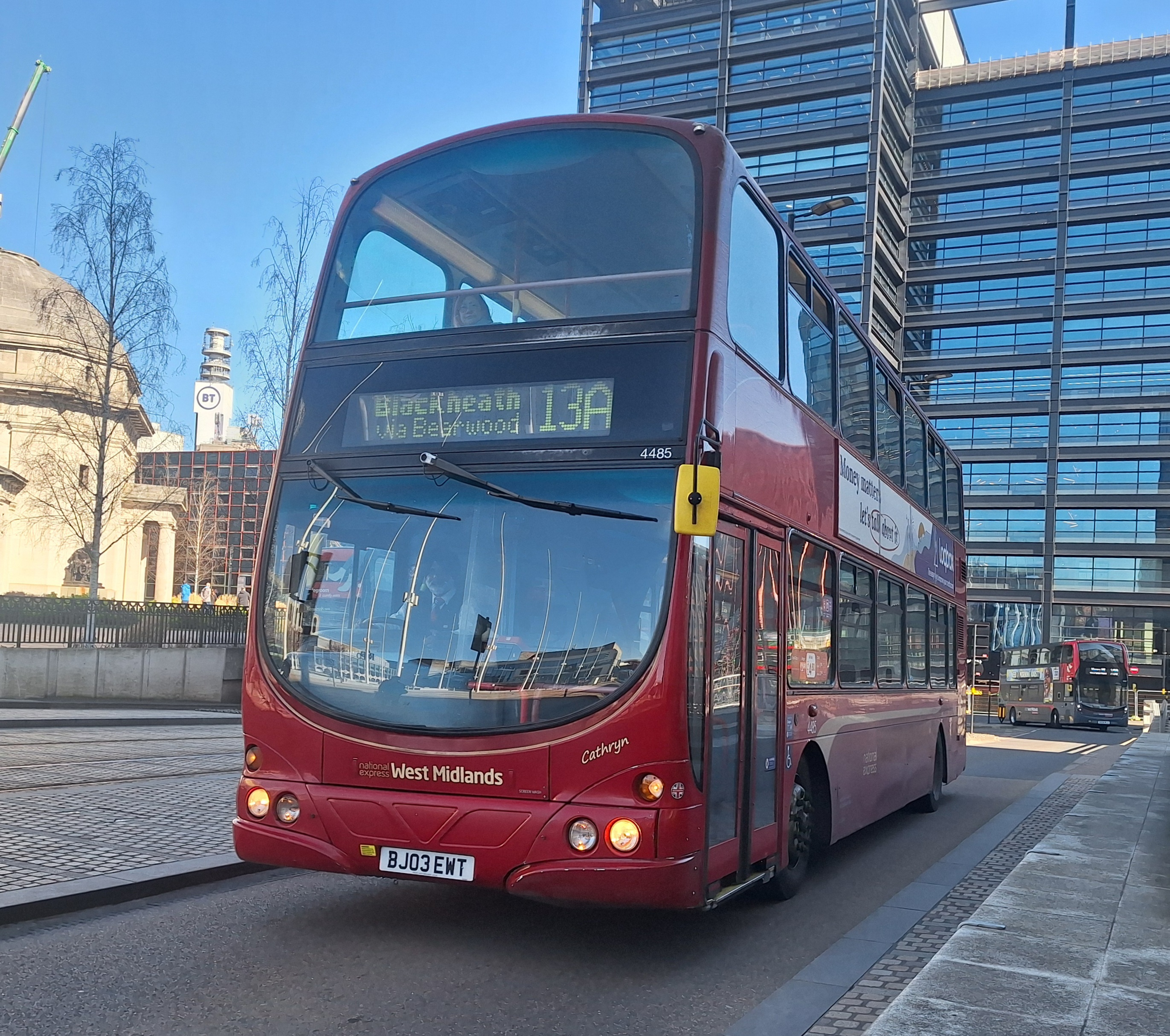
National Express West Midlands Wright Eclipse Gemini bodied Volvo B7TL at Birmingham in March 2025

== See also ==
Media related to Volvo B7TL at Wikimedia Commons

- List of buses
