= Plaxton President =

2-axle low-floor double-decker bus body

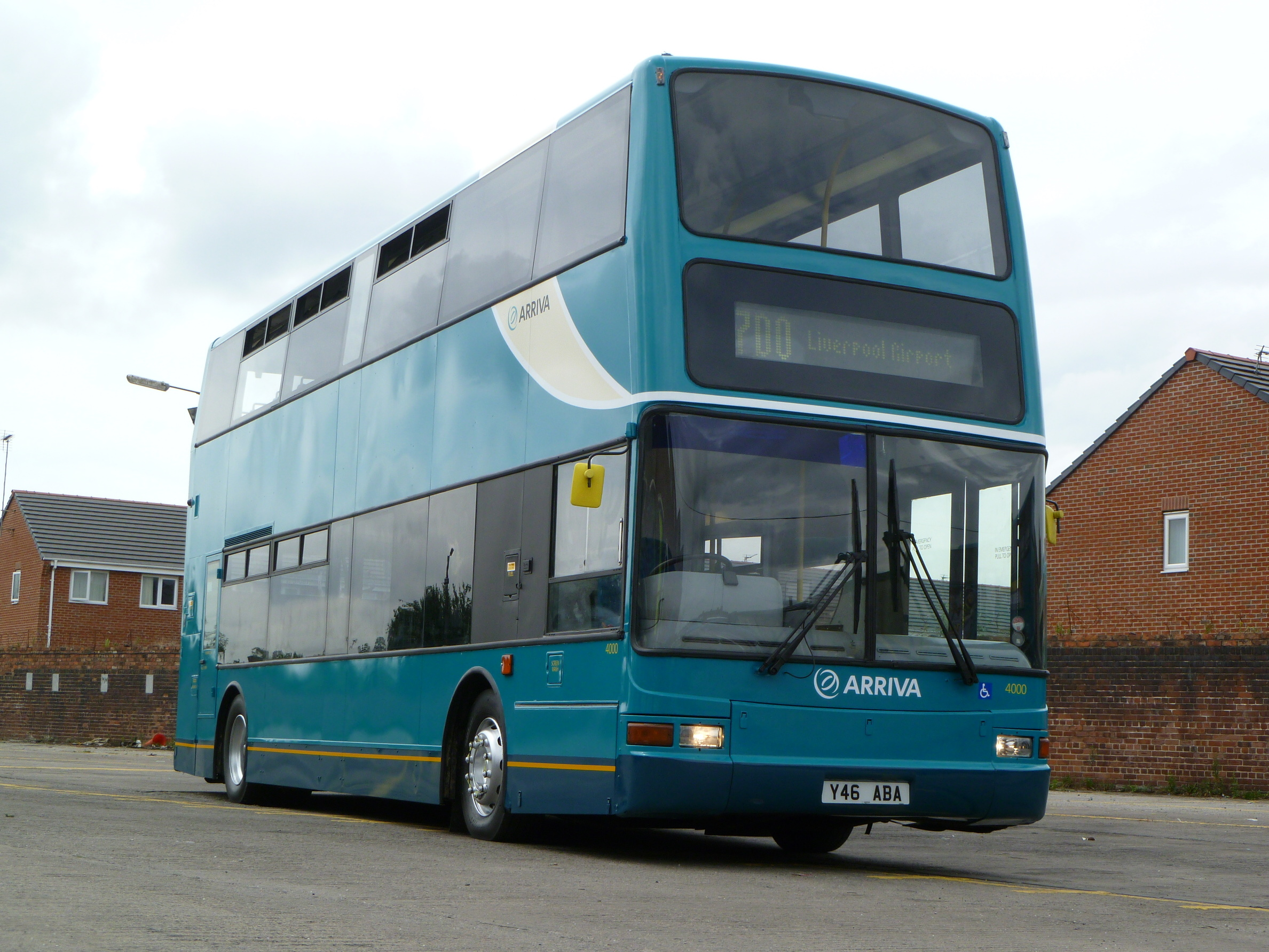
- Arriva North West President bodied Dennis Trident 2 in 2010

Overview
- Manufacturer: Plaxton/TransBus/Alexander Dennis
- Production: 1999–2005
- Assembly: Wigan, England

Body and chassis
- Doors: 1 or 2
- Floor type: Low floor
- Chassis: Dennis Trident 2 Volvo B7TL; VDL DB250

Powertrain
- Engine: Cummins C Series/ISCe (Dennis Trident 2); Volvo D7C (Volvo B7TL); DAF (VDL DB250)
- Transmission: Voith DIWA/ZF Ecomat

Dimensions
- Length: 9.9–11.5 m (32 ft 6 in – 37 ft 9 in)
- Width: 2.55 m (8 ft 4 in)
- Height: 4.2–4.4 m (13 ft 9 in – 14 ft 5 in)

Chronology
- Predecessor: Northern Counties Palatine

The Plaxton President is a low floor double-decker bus body built by Plaxton at the former Northern Counties factory in Wigan, England. It was first unveiled in 1997 on the longitudinal Volvo B7L chassis and later built between 1999 and 2005 following a body redesign. When it became part of TransBus International, the body was sold under the TransBus name. The President was built on the Dennis/TransBus Trident, the DAF DB250 and the Volvo B7TL chassis.

== Design ==
Launched at the Coach & Bus '97 expo in Birmingham on the as-yet-unannounced Volvo B7L chassis, the Plaxton President was designed as the successor of the Northern Counties Palatine to compete with the low-floor Alexander ALX400 body, being the first 2.55 metres (8 ft 4 in) wide bus body produced in the United Kingdom following a 1995 amendment to the Road Vehicles (Construction and Use) Regulations 1986 that legalised their operation. The President was available with the option of a central interior staircase, though later models would see the staircase moved behind the air-conditioned driver's cab. The President had rectangular front headlights below a large front windscreen, and from the side, could be recognised by the different depths of windows on the lower deck; this is less apparent with bonded-glazed models. Seating varied according to the chassis and specification; TfL models were typically built with 41 seats upstairs, and 23 downstairs with a centre exit door.

Following the collapse of TransBus International and resultant formation of Alexander Dennis, it was announced that the Plaxton's Wigan factory would close, with the Plaxton President discontinued in favour of the Falkirk-built Alexander ALX400. The final nine Presidents, all on Volvo B7TL chassis for London operator Metroline, were built at the Wigan plant in January 2005.

== Operators ==
=== London ===
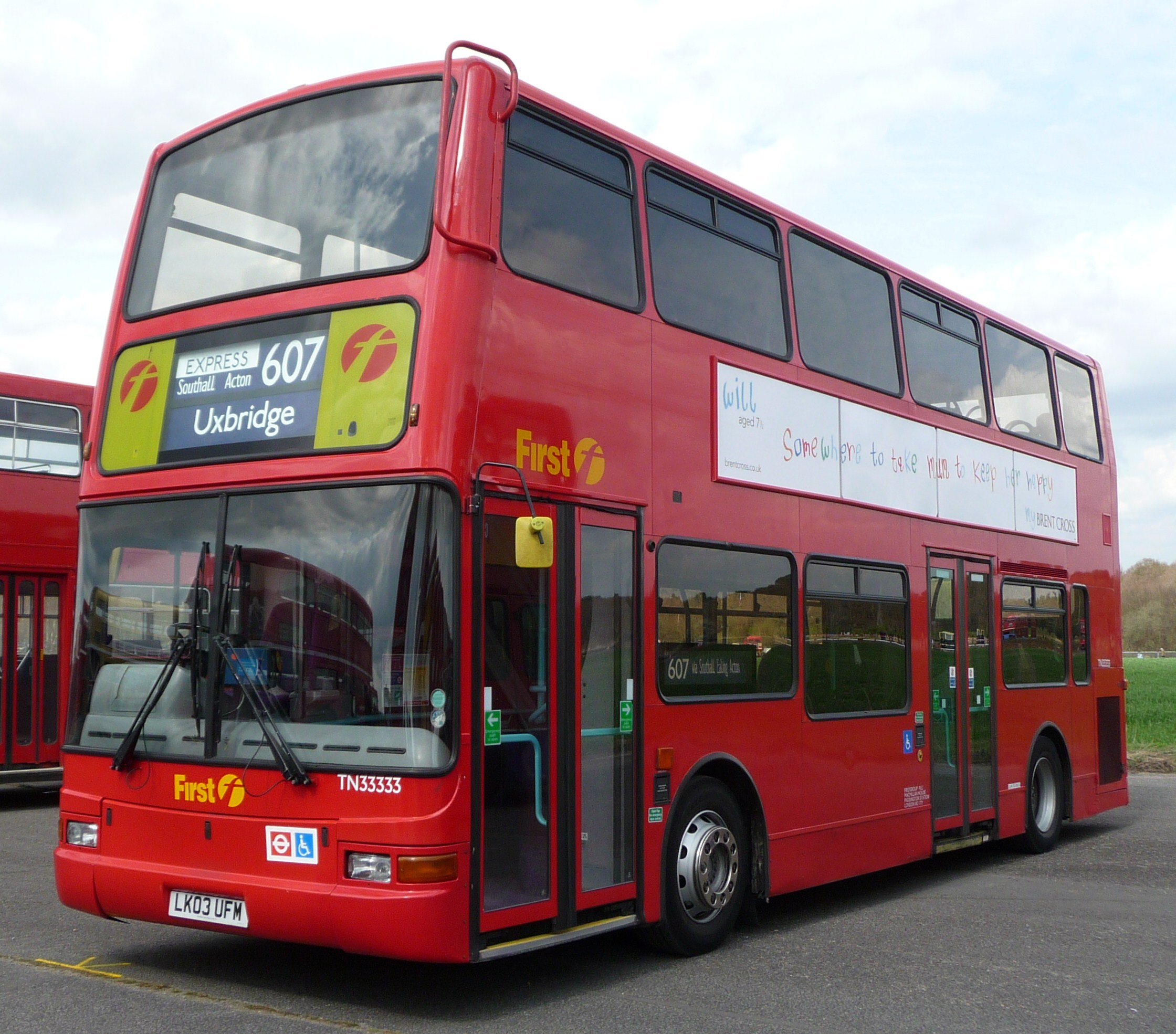
Nearside of a First London President.

The Plaxton President on various chassis combinations proved very popular with some of London's bus operators. The first production examples of the body were first delivered to Arriva London on the DAF DB250 chassis in 1999. Arriva London would go on to purchase 91 Plaxton Presidents on the DAF chassis until 2005, acquiring a further ten from Capital Logistics.

Metroline operated the most Plaxton Presidents in London, ordering 305 examples on the Volvo B7TL chassis and 260 on the Dennis Trident 2 chassis from 1999 to 2005. First London also amassed large quantities of Plaxton Presidents, taking delivery of 403 Dennis Tridents and 73 Volvo B7TLs with Plaxton President bodies from 1999 to 2003, while London General and London Central, both part of the Go-Ahead Group, purchased a total of 419 Presidents on the Volvo B7TL chassis as well as an additional 50 President-bodied Dennis Tridents.

Other major London operators included London United, who took delivery of 26 Plaxton President-bodied B7TLs in 1999, London Sovereign, who took delivery of 27 President-bodied B7TLs in two batches between 2002 and 2003, and Blue Triangle, who took delivery of two President-bodied Tridents in 2003 and also acquired two second-hand that year.

=== Outside London ===
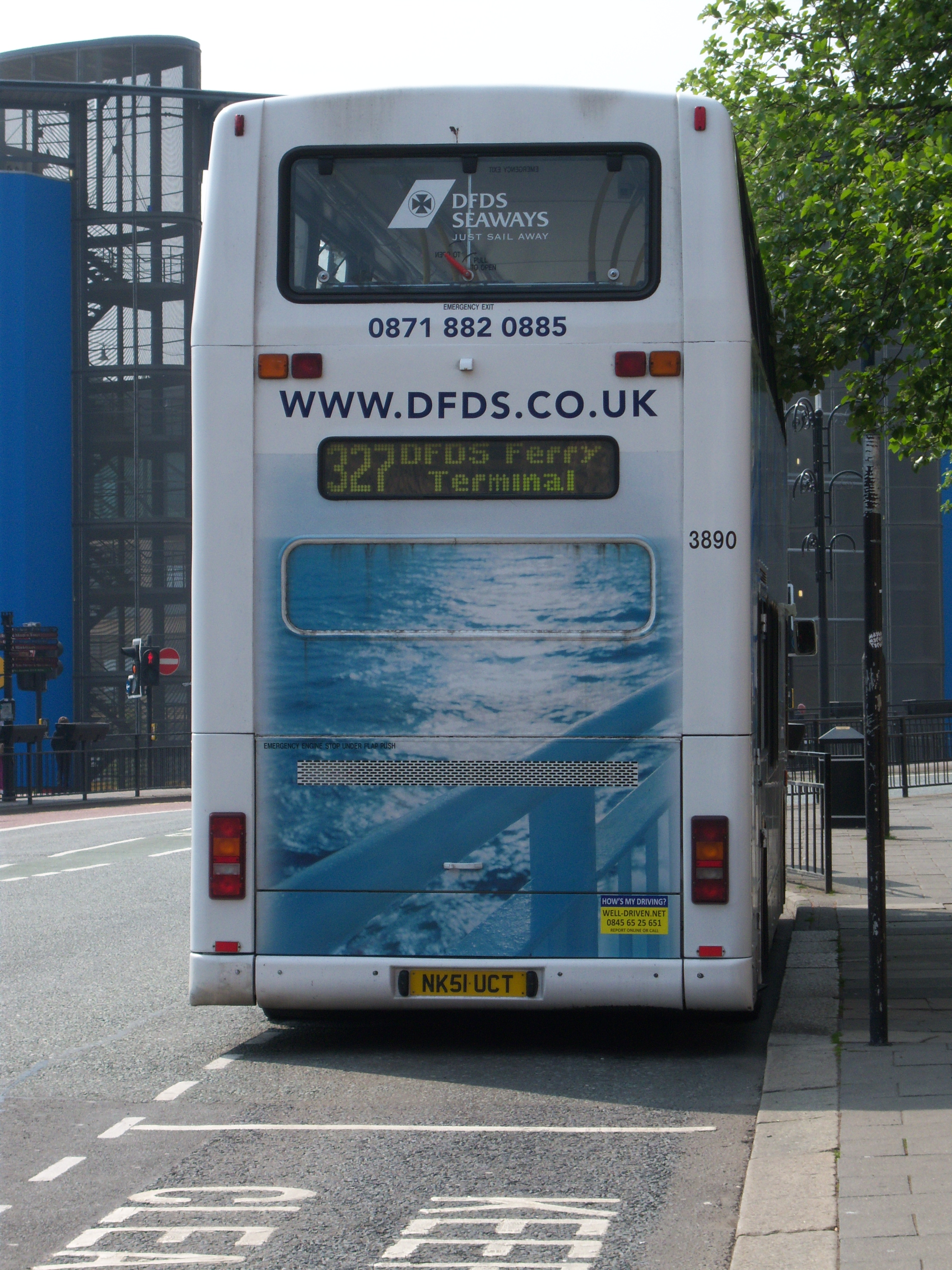
Rear of Go North East Plaxton President bodied Dennis Trident 2 in Newcastle upon Tyne in April 2009

Lothian Buses were the largest operator of Presidents outside London, purchasing approximately 205 from 1999 to 2004. All but seven examples were built on the Dennis Tridents chassis; the remaining seven Presidents were purchased on the Volvo B7TL chassis. Travel West Midlands were the second largest operator of Presidents outside London, taking delivery of 102 examples on Volvo B7TL chassis between 1999 and 2000.

Go-Ahead Group companies outside London also bought Presidents in substantial numbers. Brighton & Hove took 36 Presidents on the Dennis Trident 2 chassis between 2001 and 2002. This was followed by Go North East who took 15 in 2001 on the Dennis Trident chassis. Prior to the company being taken over by the Go-Ahead Group, Southern Vectis took delivery seven Presidents on Volvo B7TL chassis for 'Island Explorer' services in 2002.

The Stagecoach Group ordered nearly 50 low-height Presidents on Dennis Trident 2 chassis between 2000 and 2003. Stagecoach Cambus took the first seven Presidents in 2000, with the company later ordering a majority of their Presidents in 2003. 30 of these were delivered to Stagecoach Manchester, while six were delivered to Stagecoach Oxfordshire in 'Brookes Bus' livery. Stagecoach opted in 2003 for Plaxton to body these Dennis Tridents in order to support their Wigan factory, which was suffering from a lack of orders.

East Yorkshire Motor Services were another large operator of Presidents, ordering 36 lowheight examples on Volvo B7TL chassis ordered from 2000 to 2003. 30 were delivered to the main East Yorkshire fleet while six were ordered for their Finglands subsidiary in Manchester, with two Presidents for each company being delivered for evaluation in 2000 before orders commenced. East Yorkshire later purchased 27 mid-life Presidents from Go-Ahead London in 2012, some of which was converted for open top operation and driver training.

Smaller orders include Arriva, which purchased 20 between 2000 and 2001 on the Volvo B7TL chassis for its Arriva Yorkshire subsidiary, the Blazefield Group who took 19, 16 in 2001 for Burnley & Pendle's X43 express service as well as three for Yorkshire Coastliner in 2002, as well as independent based operators such as Pete's Travel, Mayne Coaches, Blue Bus & Coach Services, Hedingham Omnibuses, North Birmingham Busways and Liverpool Motor Services.

== See also ==
- List of buses
