= Dennis Trident 2 =

2-axle low-floor double-decker bus

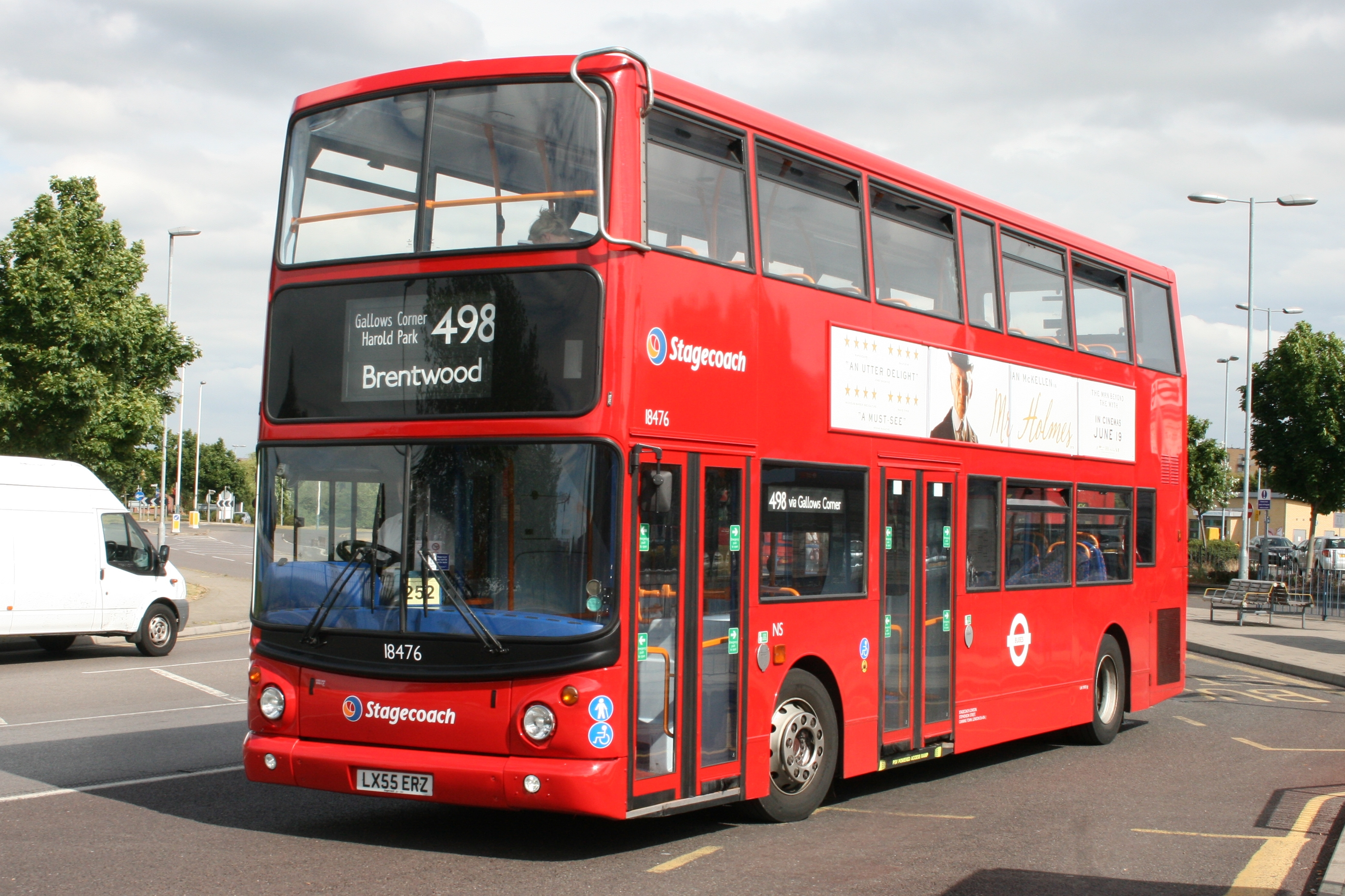
- Stagecoach London Alexander Dennis ALX400 bodied Trident 2 at Queen's Hospital on route 498 in 2015

Overview
- Manufacturer: Dennis; TransBus International; Alexander Dennis
- Production: 1997–2006
- Assembly: Guildford, England

Body and chassis
- Doors: 1 or 2
- Floor type: Low floor

Powertrain
- Engine: Cummins C Series/ISBe/ISCe/ISLe
- Power output: C Series: 220hp, 245hp ISCe: 225hp, 260hp ISBe: 250hp ISLe: 320hp
- Transmission: Voith DIWA D854.3E; ZF Ecomat 4HP502/5HP502

Dimensions
- Length: 9.9 metres (32 ft); 10.5 metres (34 ft); 10.6 metres (35 ft); 11.4 metres (37 ft)
- Width: 2.55 metres (8 ft 4 in)
- Height: 4.1–4.4 metres (13–14 ft)
- Curb weight: 17,800 kilograms (39,200 lb)

Chronology
- Predecessor: Dennis Arrow
- Successor: Alexander Dennis Enviro400

The Dennis Trident 2 (the 2 standing for 2-axle) is a 2-axle low-floor double-decker bus chassis originally manufactured by Dennis, which was unveiled in 1997 and replaced the Dennis Arrow. It was built by TransBus after Dennis was incorporated into the group in 2001, then from 2004, it was built by Alexander Dennis following the collapse of TransBus.

== Design ==
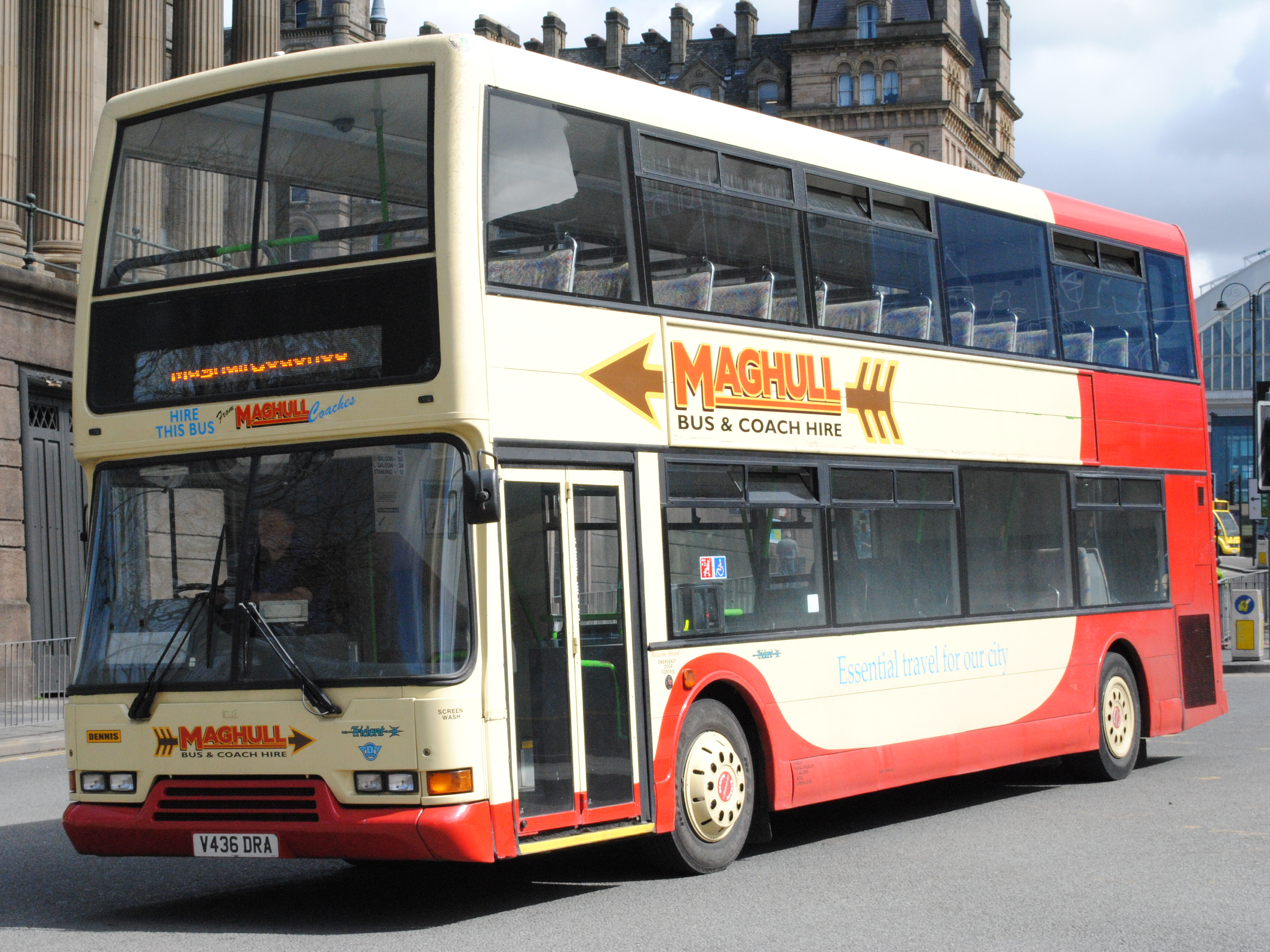
Maghull Coaches East Lancs Lolyne bodied Trident 2 in 2013

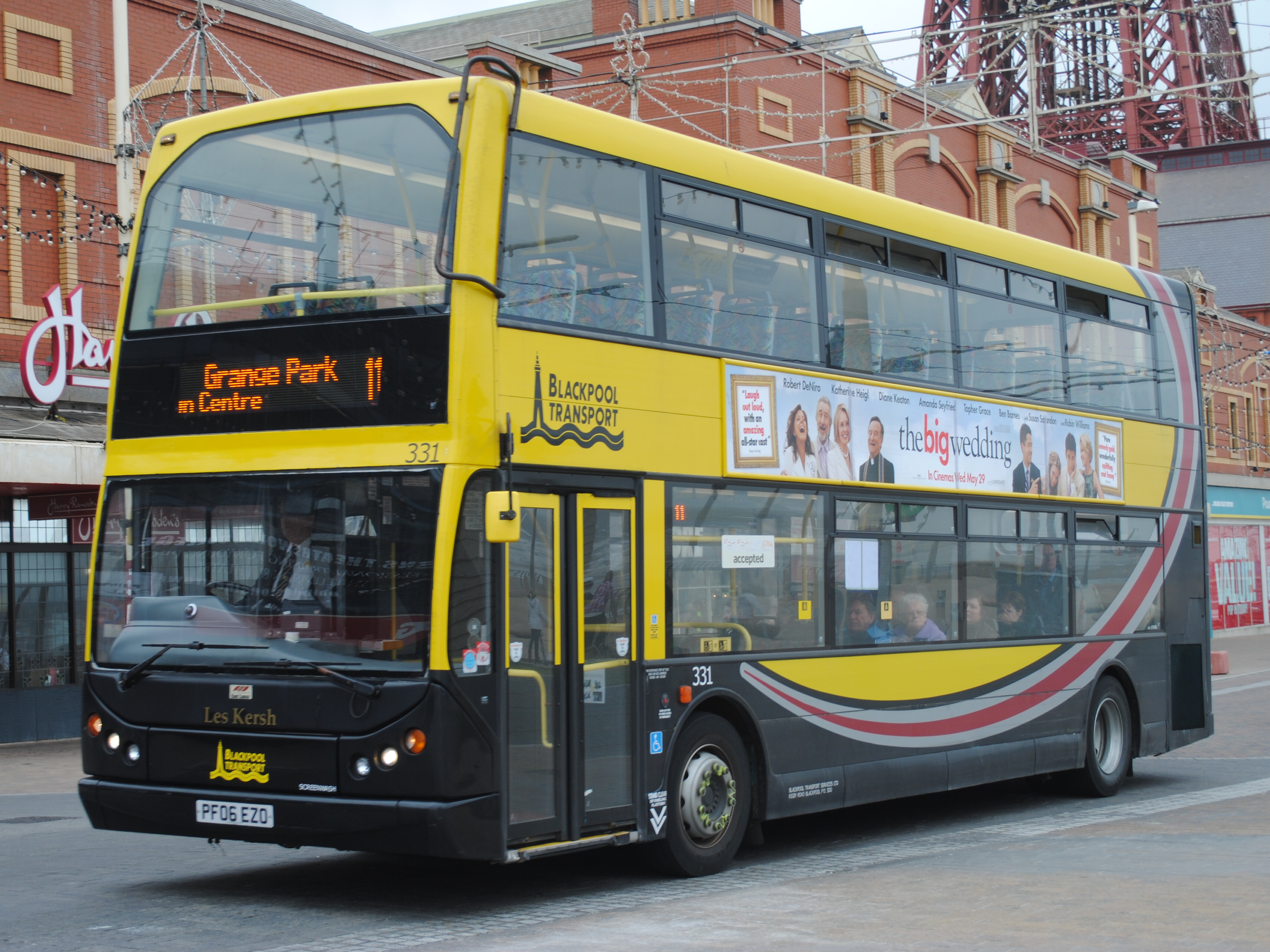
Blackpool Transport East Lancs Myllennium Lolyne bodied Trident 2 in 2013

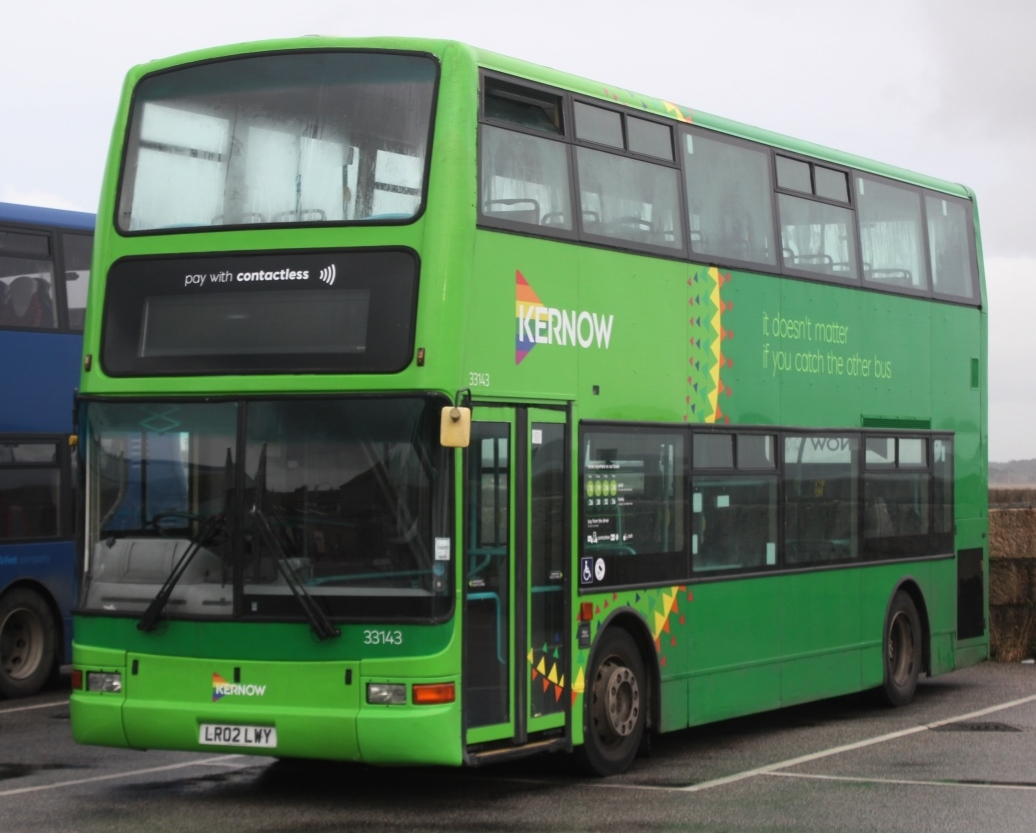
First Kernow Plaxton President bodied Trident 2 in 2018

Developed from the air-conditioned 3-axle Dennis Trident 3 for the United Kingdom bus market, upon its launch in 1998, the Trident 2 was offered with the option of being built to either 9.9 metres (32 ft) or 10.5 metres (34 ft) width and was fitted with a Euro II Cummins C Series engine coupled to a Voith DIWA D854.3E or ZF Ecomat 4HP500/5HP500 automatic transmission, each fitted with an 80-degree dropped angle drive. Later Trident 2s could be fitted with Cummins ISBe, ISCe and ISLe engines, which were compliant with Euro III and later Euro IV emissions standards, and could be built to 10.6 metres (35 ft) and 11.4 metres (37 ft) in length. Engines were rear-mounted transversely on the right side of the chassis with the radiator mounted on the left side. This was marketed by Dennis as the 'T-drive configuration', which shortened the rear overhang and overall length of the chassis.

The Trident 2 was first bodied with the Alexander ALX400 body, following on from the Alexander ALX500 on the Trident 3 chassis. Plaxton and East Lancashire Coachbuilders followed shortly after with the President and Lolyne bodies respectively. Trident 2s were intended to be compliant with statutory public service vehicle accessibility regulations introduced in the Disability Discrimination Act 1995, with an entrance step height of 325 millimetres (12.8 in) capable of being lowered to 250 millimetres (9.8 in) through a kneeling front suspension, and the 'T-drive' longitudinal system allowed for a flat floor throughout the majority of the lower deck.

== Operators ==
The first Dennis Trident 2s were delivered to Stagecoach London and Metroline in 1999, all being built with Alexander ALX400 bodies; in 2014, London's first Trident 2, numbered TA1 and operated by Stagecoach East London, would be donated to the London Bus Museum at Brooklands. A total of 2,255 Dennis Tridents would be built for London bus operators, 998 of these for Stagecoach London exclusively with Alexander ALX400 bodywork, and another 425 being built for First London with both Alexander ALX400 and Plaxton President bodywork.

The Trident 2 was also initially very popular with large bus operators outside London, with a large number sold to the Stagecoach Group, the FirstGroup, Travel West Midlands and Lothian Buses. Stagecoach's first two Dennis Trident 2s for the group's operations outside London entered service with Stagecoach Manchester in May 1999, with the first from this pair being donated to and restored by the Museum of Transport, Greater Manchester. Ten Trident 2s with Alexander ALX400 bodies were exported to Ireland for Dublin Bus, with larger numbers with open-top East Lancs Lolyne bodies exported to Spain sightseeing operations in Barcelona and Madrid. Due to increased competition after the launch of the Scania OmniDekka and TransBus being put into administration, sales of Trident 2 dropped significantly, leaving Stagecoach as its major buyer.

In 2005, Alexander Dennis launched the integral Enviro400 double-decker, developed from the Trident 2 with upgrades including a fully flat floor and nine more seats in the lower-deck. Production of the Trident 2 chassis continued in parallel with the new Enviro400 until June 2006, with the last five Trident 2s for a UK operator delivered with East Lancs Myllennium Lolyne bodies to Blackpool Transport, and the final six Trident 2s produced delivered with the same bodywork to Isle of Man Transport.
