= Unilink (disambiguation) =

Unilink may refer to:

- Unilink, a branded bus service
- Unilink (Stirling bus route), a bus service in Scotland
- The unilink coupler used in Finland
