= Glasgow Flyer =

Discontinued bus route in Glasgow, Scotland

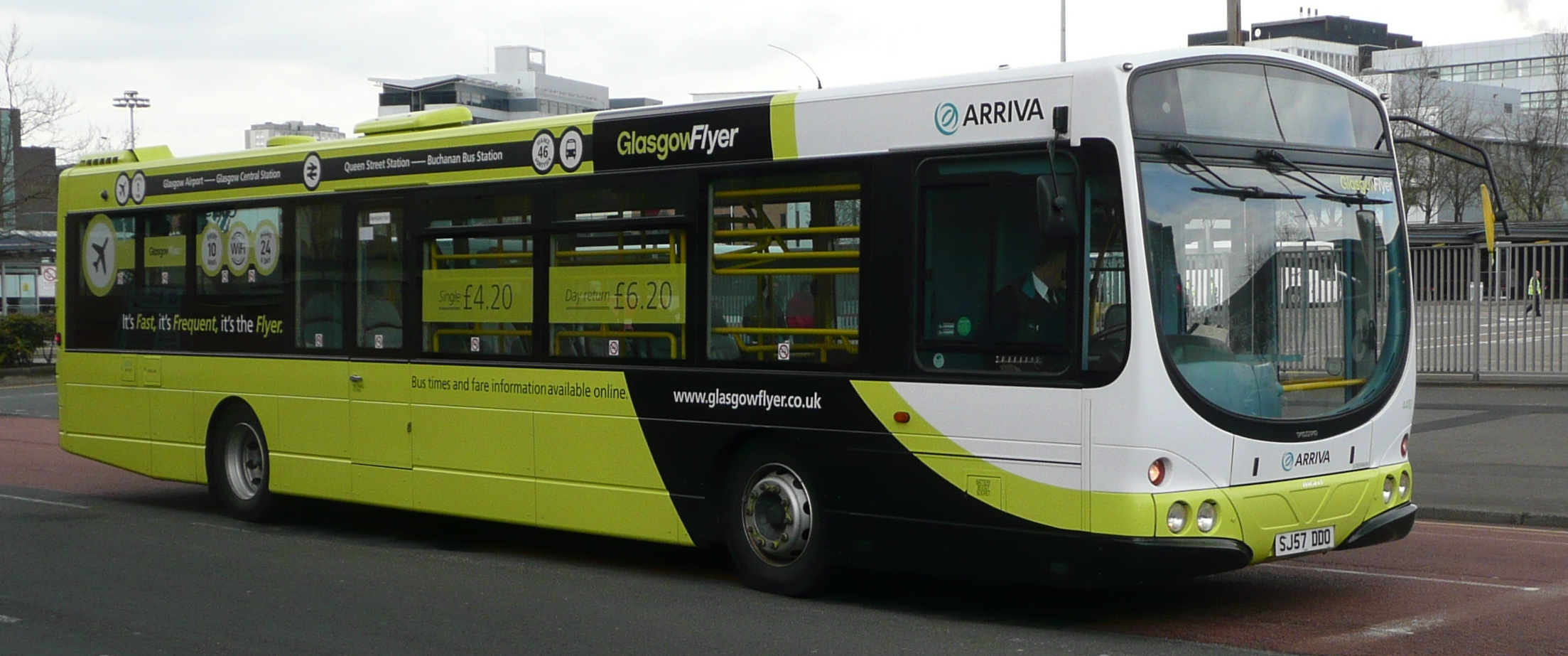
- A Glasgow Flyer outside Buchanan Bus Station
- Parent: Arriva
- Destinations: Glasgow Airport; Buchanan bus station
- Fleet: 11 Volvo B7RLE/Wright Eclipse
- Operator: Arriva Scotland West
- Website: www.glasgowflyer.com

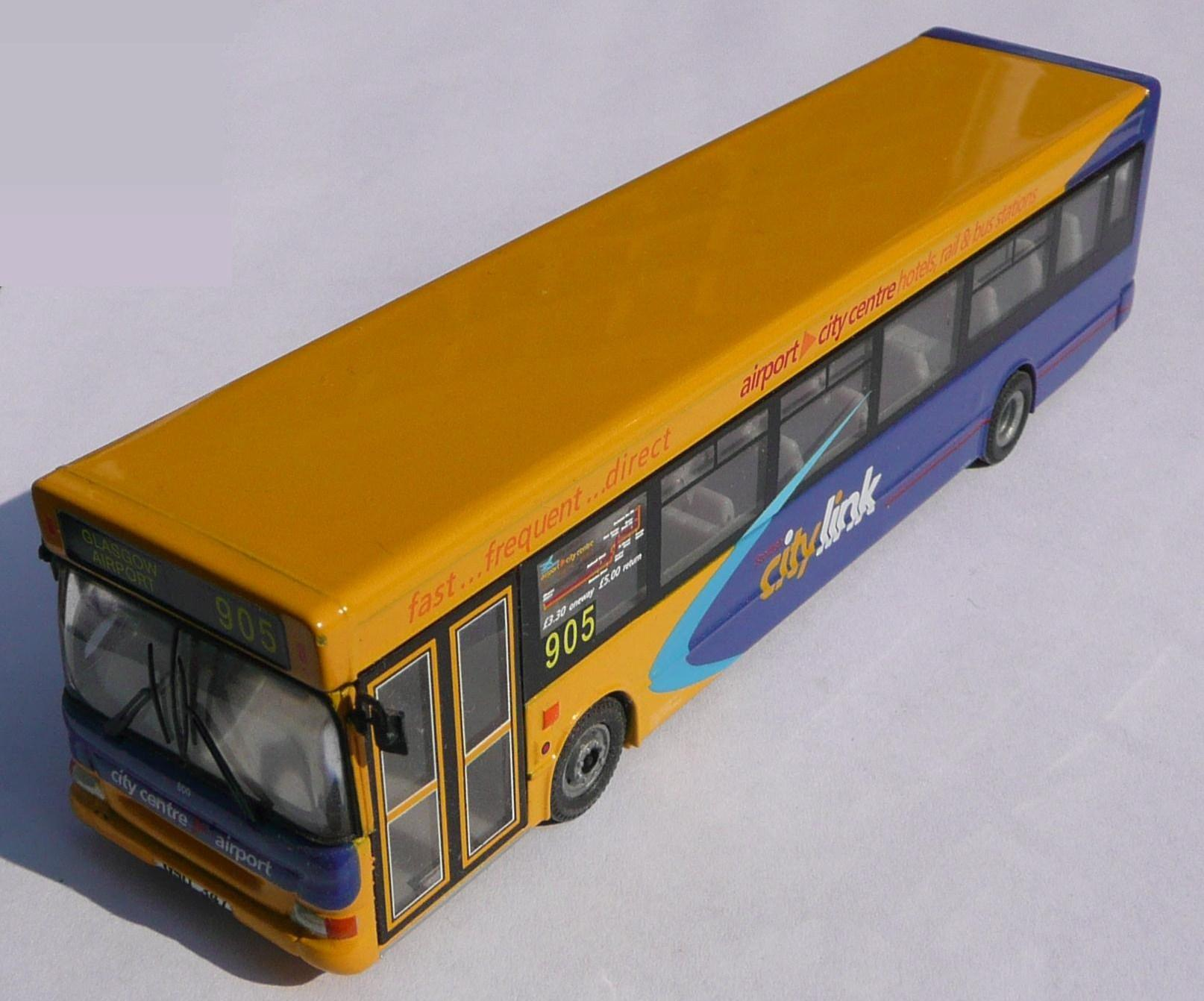
A model of a bus in the previous Scottish Citylink 905 livery

The Glasgow Flyer was a branded airport bus service in Glasgow, Scotland. It connected Glasgow Airport to central Glasgow, operating as a shuttle bus via the M8 motorway. In Glasgow city centre it operated from the Buchanan bus station, also calling at Glasgow's two mainline railway termini. It was formerly operated under contract to airport operator BAA until 31 December 2010, but the ongoing contract to operate the service was given to First Glasgow from 1 January 2011 and operated as a scheduled Arriva service. The Glasgow Flyer service was discontinued on 31 July 2011.

== History ==
The original bus service to Glasgow Airport was route 905, which was operated by Fairline Coaches under contract to Scottish Citylink, and ran a similar route. Arriva also ran extra buses on this route. All buses were in the Scottish Citylink yellow and blue colours, although the timetable stated buses in Fairline's livery may be used on the service at times. In February 2007, the 905 was re-launched with increased frequency and a new livery.

The Glasgow Flyer was announced on 1 June 2007, with a start date of 9 July, and subsequently route 905 was withdrawn. Fairline Coaches instead started a competing independently run service, Glasgow Airport Link, using route number 905. In July 2008, Fairline Coaches sold its Glasgow City Centre - Glasgow Airport route 905 to First Glasgow; this service no longer runs.

In late 2009, two of the vehicles used on the service were painted in Arriva's standard livery, to be used on other routes, mainly the X23 run in competition with McGill's Bus Services. In January 2010 the service ceased to be operated under contract to BAA as the tender was awarded to First Glasgow to continue the BAA branded airport express service under the new name Glasgow Shuttle. However, Arriva continued to operate the Glasgow Flyer in competition with the official provider without BAA support, albeit with a revised livery.

In 2011, Arriva announced the Glasgow Flyer would terminate service on 31 July 2011, citing a lack of access to the Public Transport Zone at Glasgow International Airport.

== Vehicles used ==
Arriva invested £1.5 million on 11 new buses for the service. The vehicles were Volvo B7RLE/Wright Eclipses, in a lime green, black and white livery. Each vehicle emits 13% less carbon emissions than the previous buses used on the service. They were expected in service in November 2007, but the first was launched on 4 December 2007 at Glasgow Airport. Between the new buses arriving and service starting, a fleet of Plaxton Centros was used, alongside conventional Arriva buses with branding for the service. The Centros were then put on to standard Arriva routes. An Optare MetroRider had been painted into the Glasgow Flyer livery for staff transport duties.

== Service features ==
The service operated at 24-hour service, 7 days a week and all year, with prices lower than the equivalent taxi fare. The service ran every 10 minutes at daytime.

== Routes ==
=== 500 ===
The bus followed a different route in each direction in Glasgow City Centre, due to the one-way traffic system there. The service took approximately 20 minutes in either direction.

==== Route departing city centre ====
- Buchanan bus station, stance 46
- North Hanover Street, for Queen Street station
- St Vincent Street
- Waterloo Street, for Central station
- Direct via M8 motorway
- Glasgow Airport, stance B5

==== Route departing airport ====
- Glasgow Airport, stance B5
- Direct via M8 Motorway
- Bothwell Street, for Central station
- West George Street
- North Hanover Street, for Queen Street station
- Buchanan bus station, stance 46

== See also ==
- 747 AirLink
- List of bus operators of the United Kingdom
