= Ayrshire Bus Owners (A1 Service) =

Bus operator in North Ayrshire, Scotland

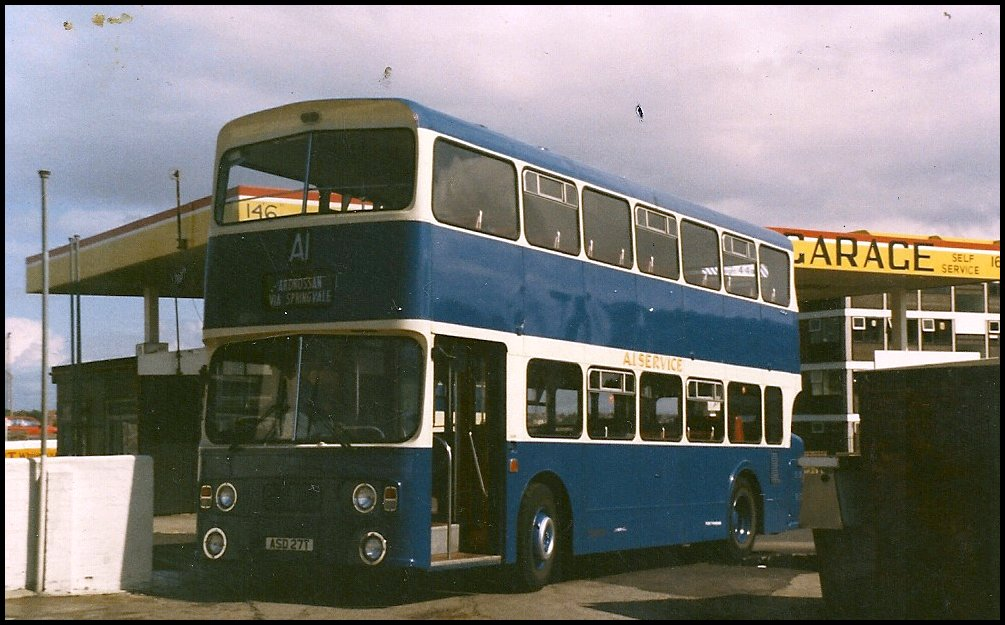
- An A1 Service Alexander bodied Leyland Fleetline in 1979
- Founded: May 27, 1931
- Ceased operation: January 1995
- Headquarters: Ardrossan, North Ayrshire, Scotland
- Service area: Ardrossan; Dreghorn; Glasgow; Irvine; Kilmarnock; Kilwinning; Saltcoats; Stevenston
- Service type: Bus and coach
- Depots: 1
- Fleet: 75 (April 1990)
- Operator: 12 bus owners
- General manager: Douglas Blades

Ayrshire Bus Owners (A1 Service) Ltd was a prominent independent co-operative bus operator in Ayrshire, Scotland. Based in Ardrossan, it provided local bus services around the towns of Ardrossan, Saltcoats, Stevenston, Kilwinning, Irvine and Dreghorn, as well as the company's trunk route from Ardrossan to Kilmarnock. It also provided express coach services from Ardrossan to Glasgow throughout the 1980s.

== History ==
Ayrshire Bus Owners (A1 Service) Ltd was set up as a legal entity on 27 May 1931. The related Ayrshire Bus Owners Association had been formed in 1925. Many of the companies which formed it had existed for much longer.

In the early 1920s there were over 60 operators in an area bound by Largs to the north, Kilmarnock to the east and Ayr by the south. To protect themselves from the main operator in the area, Scottish General Transport, many of the smaller operators grouped together and in 1925 began the Ayrshire Bus Owners Association. The association, which operated as A1 Service, was based on a similar concept in Lanarkshire. The Ayrshire group also chose this trading name and from 1926 offered a regular timetabled service between Ardrossan and Kilmarnock. Each member of the association continued to own and maintain their vehicles at their own premises.

Some regrouping took place in the late 1920s, and some members left to form Clyde Coast Services in spring 1929, operating between Saltcoats and Largs. In 1930 more members, including Dodds Of Troon, broke away to form Ayrshire Bus Owners AA Service, which would later become AA Buses. Clyde Coast Coaches and Dodds Of Troon continue to be prominent coach operators in the west of Scotland, though their bus operations were sold to Stagecoach in the 1990s.

The regulation of the British bus industry was introduced under the 1930 Road Traffic Act and Traffic Commissioners were introduced to licence operators, vehicles and routes. This prompted the Ayrshire Bus Owners to organise in a more formal manner, and the legal company Ayrshire Bus Owners (A1 Service) Ltd was created, with a base at Parkhouse Road, Ardrossan.

A mainly blue livery, with light cream round the window areas and a maroon belt was introduced for the owner's vehicles and over the course of 60 years the company would continue as a successful co-operative. Though it was rare for new members to join, many would leave through retirement or ill-health, with their vehicles and shares in the company being sold on to other members. A1 was slow to introduce 'one person operated' buses, only introducing them in 1983, primarily for evening and Sunday bus services, despite unsuccessfully lobbying against their introduction by other operators to the area Traffic Commissioner, and conductors continued on the arterial Ardrossan/Kilmarnock service well into the late 1990s, even under Stagecoach ownership.

In the mid-1990s A1 Service found itself in a difficult position. The only profitable service was the trunk Ardrossan/Kilmarnock service, which operated every 10 minutes and demanded the use of double decker buses. The company had also been warned about the mechanical state of some its vehicles by the Traffic Commissioner, as many were becoming elderly and unreliable. As a result, some members decided that they wanted out of the company and offered their shares for sale.

The owners came to the agreement that they would approach Western Scottish, which had just recently become a subsidiary of the Stagecoach Group, and offer the company for sale. Western Scottish agreed to buy the company and some of its vehicles for £4.3 million, and in January 1995 A1 Service ceased trading as an independent operator and became a subsidiary company of Stagecoach.

At the time of sale, Ayrshire Bus Owners (A1 Service) Ltd operated 97 vehicles, owned by 10 members. A Monopolies and Mergers Commission report into the takeover cleared Stagecoach of being predatory and approved the sale.

== Today ==
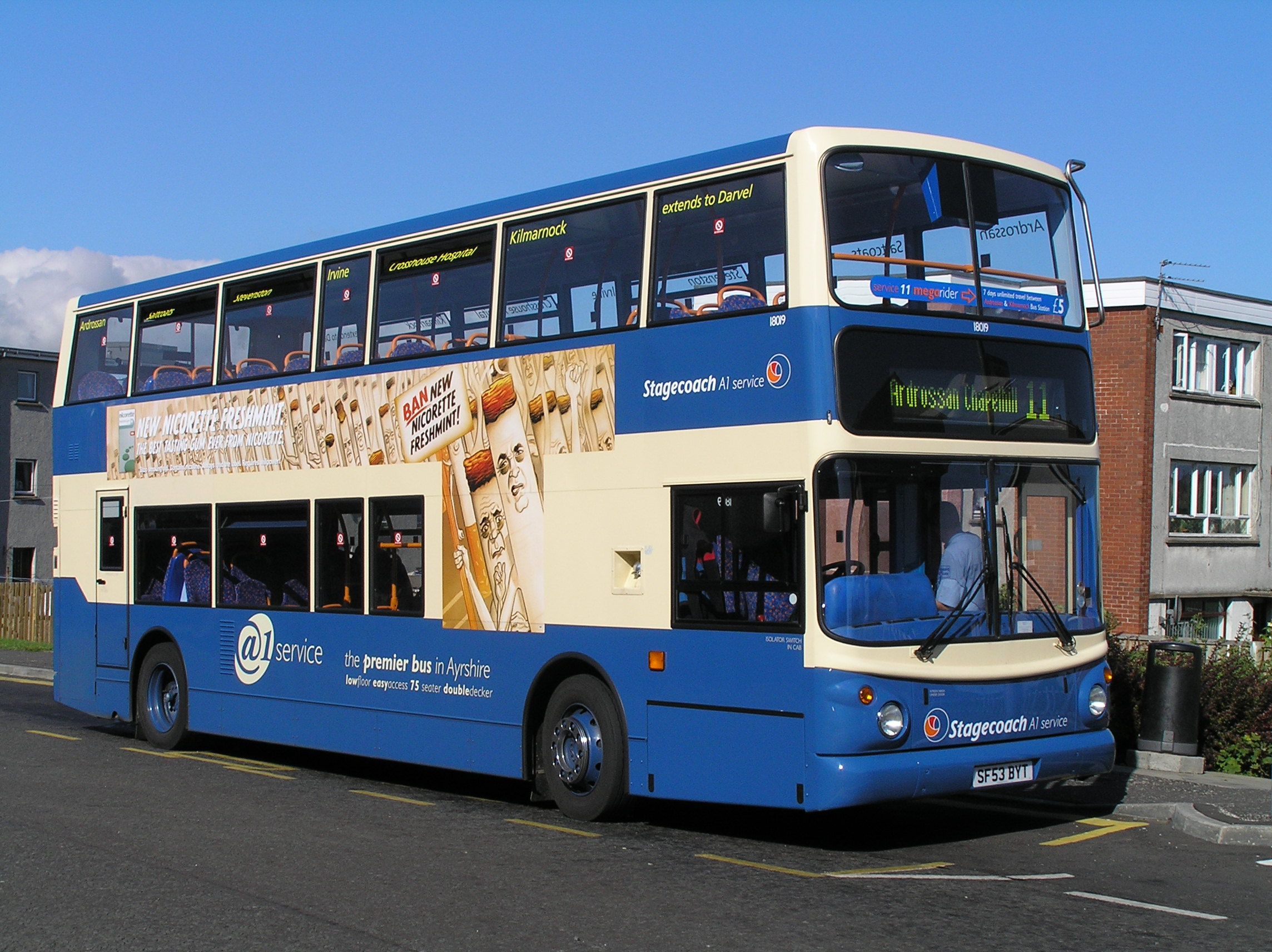
A Stagecoach A1 Service bus in Ardrossan.

The company was taken over by the Stagecoach Group in January 1995. The simple blue and cream livery the buses wore since the company's formation gave way to the Stagecoach corporate blue, red and orange stripes on white, and the legal name of the firm became Stagecoach (A1 Service) Ltd. Though for several years after the take over buses on the former A1 Service routes wore Stagecoach A1 Service fleetnames, the unit was eventually amalgamated with Western Buses Ltd and all vehicles except those on the Ardrossan-Kilmarnock service began trading as Stagecoach Western. However, buses on route 11 (Ardrossan-Kilmarnock) continued to trade as Stagecoach A1 Service, complete with the historical blue and cream livery, which was re-introduced when FirstGroup began competing on the service. Despite the withdrawal of First from Ayrshire in October 2005, new Dennis Tridents were still delivered in the Stagecoach A1 Service livery and brand.

Some of the former A1 members continue to operate their own businesses, including Parkhouse Garage of Ardrossan (service station and car repairs) and McKinnon of Kilmarnock (haulage). McMenemy of Ardrossan wound up their car repairs business in December 2004 and sold their premises to Clydeport plc, although the coach hire operation continued until March 2005. Docherty Of Irvine had always run a parallel coach hire firm separate to A1 Service and ventured back into local bus operation around the Irvine and Kilmarnock area in competition with Stagecoach Western in the late 1990s, but sold its routes and associated vehicles to Stagecoach Western in October 2004. Docherty ceased operations and sold its vehicles in 2009.

The A1 service branding was removed from Stagecoach's vehicles on route 11 on 30 May 2010. The next day, Stagecoach rolled out 27 brand new buses in their corporate "swoops", spelling the end of the A1 livery after over 80 years.

== Competition ==
During its existence as an independent concern, A1 Service experienced little to no competition on any of its services. A1 had a good working relationship with the neighbouring co-operative bus companies, AA Motor Services and Clyde Coast Services, and there was no competition between the three operators. Prior to bus deregulation in 1986, A1 Service did regularly spar with the dominant operator in the region, Western SMT (later Western Scottish). Western had a depot in Ardrossan and also offered a service from Ardrossan to Kilmarnock, though not nearly as frequent as that of A1 Service. Traffic Commissioners court battles took place between A1 Service and Western over the right to serve any new developments, particularly the Chapelhill housing estate in the north of Ardrossan. However, after deregulation any real threat from Western did not materialise and the company scaled down its presence in north Ayrshire.

The 1980 Transport Act freed longer-distance coach services from regulation and a new operator, Bennett's of Kilwinning, pioneered express services between Ardrossan to Glasgow. A1 Service introduced a competing service. Ironically, Bennett's was to be one of the first Stagecoach acquisitions, and A1 Service found itself competing with the fledgling Perth-based operator. Stagecoach withdrew from the service, allowing Henry Crawford Coaches of Neilston to take over, and A1 itself later withdrew from the route.

In the early 1990s locally based Valley Bus Company introduced a local circular service in competition with A1 in Saltcoats. A1 retaliated by introducing a parallel minibus service while its existing local services continued to run unaffected. After a few the new operator withdrew its service.

Since becoming part of the Stagecoach Group, A1 has faced more sustained and prolonged competition from First Glasgow. With the introduction of Stagecoach services within the city of Glasgow in 1997, First responded by introducing a service between Ardrossan and Kilmarnock. The service ran to the same route and timetable as the Stagecoach route. For a few months after the competing route's launch both operators ran their services free of charge. First and Stagecoach continued to compete on the trunk route until the withdrawal of First on 8 October 2005.

== See also ==
- List of bus operators of the United Kingdom
