= 38 Glasgow–Johnstone =

Bus service in Scotland

38

Overview
- Operator: McGills
- Status: Operating

Route
- Start: Johnstone
- Via: Paisley
- End: Glasgow

The 38 is a bus service which operates between Johnstone and Glasgow via Paisley.

== History ==
In 2016, conductors were trialed on the route during peak times in a bid to reduce journey times.

On 31 May 2021, the route was shortened with the section from Johnstone to Kilbarchan being replaced by a new service numbered 32. McGills stated that splitting the service would increase reliability, and blamed local councillors for not doing enough to tackle congestion caused by cars in Johnstone, Paisley, and Glasgow.

In late 2021, the route began being operated entirely by electric buses.

In February 2022, night time journeys were rerouted to bypass Elderslie and instead travel along the A737 following several instances of stones being thrown at buses.
