= Arriva Scotland West =

British bus operating company

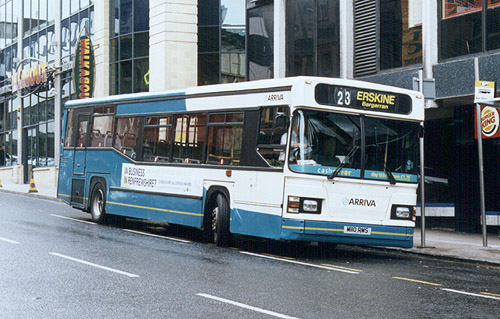
- East Lancs MaxCi bodied Scania N113CRL in Glasgow in 2002
- Parent: Arriva
- Founded: 1985
- Ceased operation: 2012
- Headquarters: Inchinnan
- Service area: Glasgow; Renfrewshire
- Service type: Bus operator
- Hubs: Inchinnan; Johnstone
- Fleet: 194 (June 2009)

Arriva Scotland West was a bus company based in Inchinnan, near Paisley, Scotland. It was formed in 1997 as a rebranding of the former Clydeside 2000 company when purchased by Arriva. On 26 March 2012, the business was sold to McGill's Bus Services.

== History ==
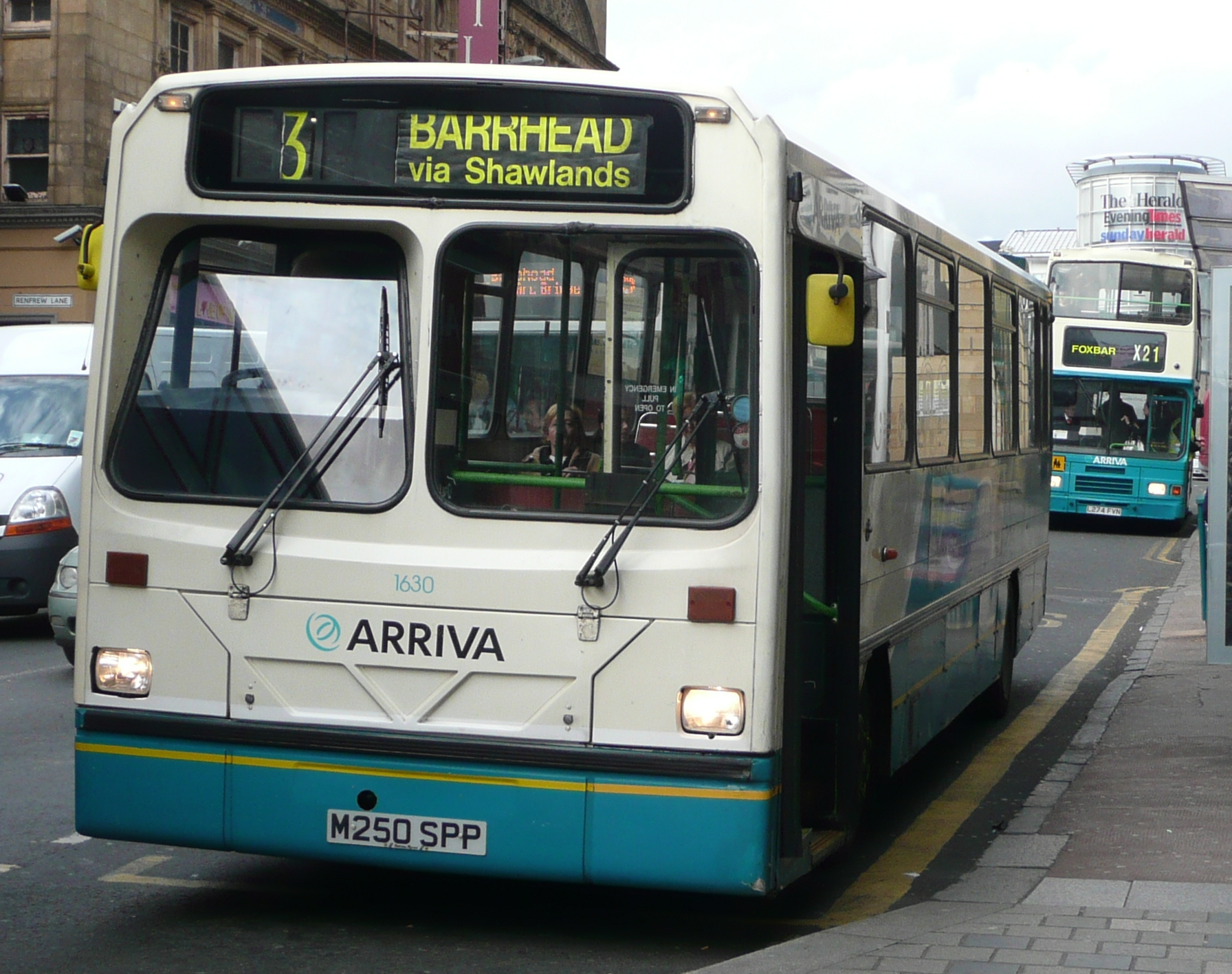
Wright Handybus bodied Dennis Dart in Glasgow in April 2008

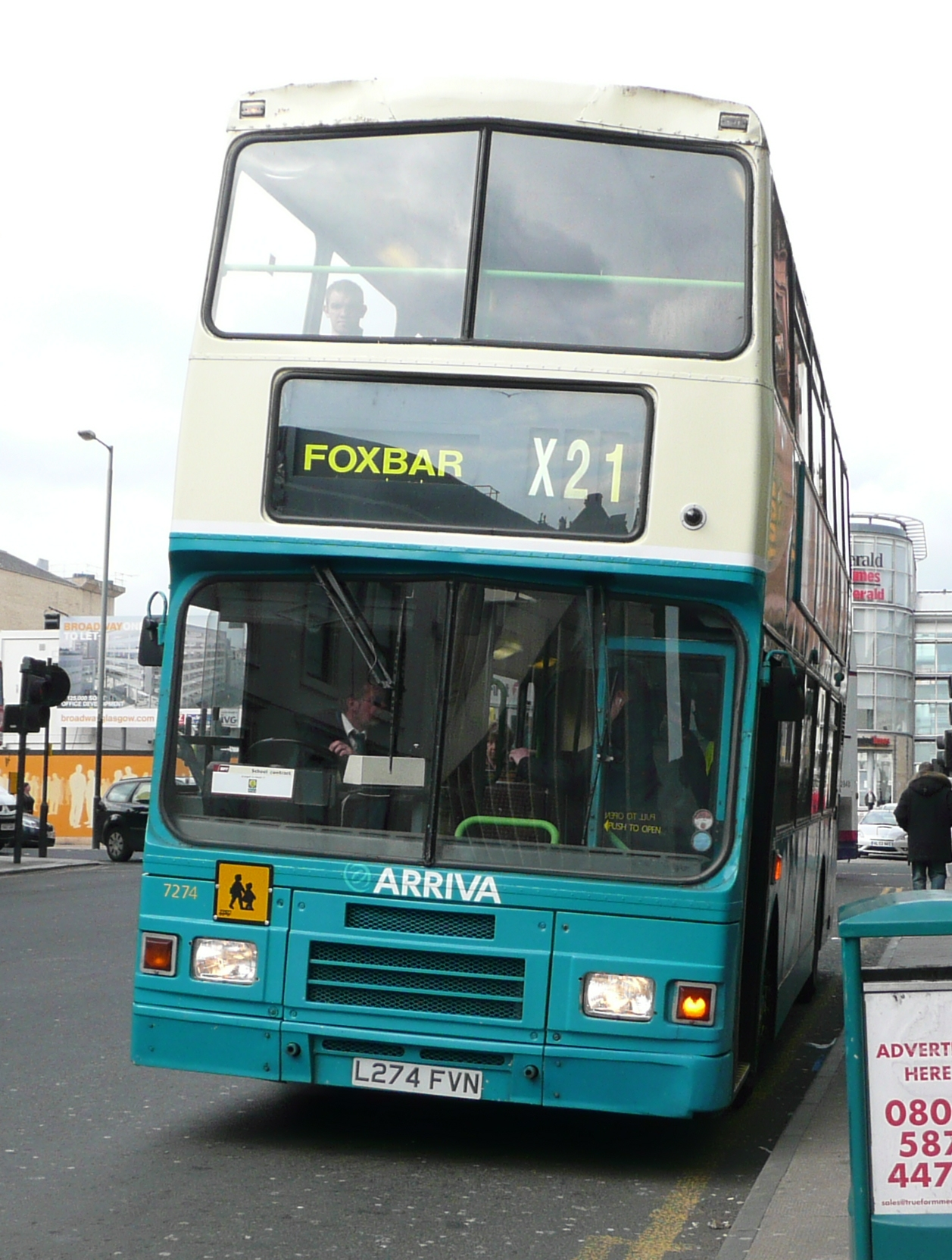
Alexander RH bodied Leyland Olympian in Glasgow in April 2008

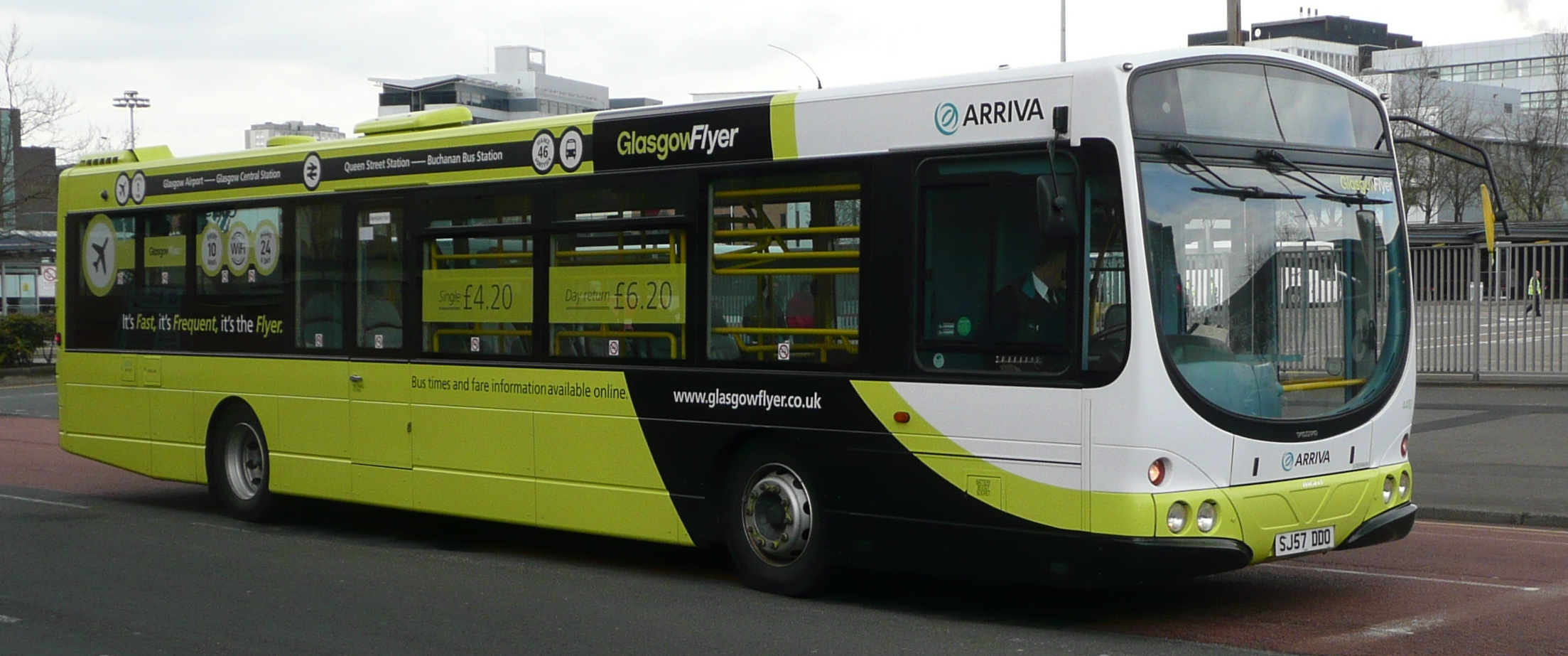
Wright Eclipse Urban bodied Volvo B7RLE used on the Glasgow Flyer service in April 2008

Clydeside was formed as Clydeside Scottish in June 1985 from the northern operations of Western SMT to prepare the state-owned parent company, the Scottish Bus Group, for deregulation.

At the time, Clydeside's operating area was much larger, covering Inverclyde (including the towns of Gourock and Greenock), the Isle of Bute and much of the south side of Glasgow. Clydeside was re-merged with Western Scottish (Western SMT's successor company) in 1989 in an attempt to make it more financially viable. However, on the privatisation of Western Scottish the Clydeside operations were sold in a management buyout as Clydeside 2000 plc with Luton & District taking a 23% stake. Clydeside began rationalising some of its operations, and depots at Largs, Paisley and Thornliebank were closed, the latter as a result of a reduction in operations within Glasgow.

In November 1994, Clydeside 2000 was sold to British Bus, who had just completed the take over of shareholder Luton & District. The new parent company began investing heavily in the ageing fleet. A more vibrant red, white and yellow livery was introduced, and new "Flagship" routes were created to raise quality levels. Clydeside Buses was included in the 1 August 1996 sale of British Bus to the Cowie Group, which in November 1997 was rebranded as Arriva.

The main competitor in Greenock, Ashton Coaches, was purchased along with 62 buses in July 1997. The Greenock operations were re-branded GMS Greenock Motor Services, using Ashton's white, green and gold livery, in order to more effectively combat the plethora of small operators in the town. Long established independent operator McGill's Bus Services of Barrhead was also purchased in the same month, and initially continued to operate under its own identity. A stake was also taken in Dart Buses of Paisley, another competitor, though this operator would soon go out of business.

Shortly after being launched as Arriva Scotland West in 1998, the company flirted with operations outside its traditional operating area, successfully securing tenders to operate services in Cumbernauld (where a depot was established for a few years) and south east Glasgow, though these were short-lived. It is said that Cumbernauld prompted "the look east". Arriva tried to expand further in Scotland by purchasing Xplore Dundee but they went to National Express instead. It was also interested in purchasing Midland Bluebird and a Strathclyde Buses depot if they were sold following the OFT's requirements for First to sell them but Stagecoach's increased attempts at competing for the Greater Glasgow bus market put paid to that. Later that year, Arriva tried to run contracted services in Edinburgh. Lothian Buses had run the services for a while but when it was time to renew said contracts, the council considered Lothian's new tender prices to be too expensive. So then it invited other operators the opportunity to participate instead and was pleasantly surprised to see bids from Arriva using new low floor buses, for a substantially cheaper price than Lothian! The tenders were accepted but shortly before they were due to commence, the council was advised that Arriva had withdrawn their bids. In a move that some might consider to be of a dubious nature, Lothian also stated later that day that they could run the contracts for free when previously it couldn't. Exactly how that is still remains a mystery to this day.

Further rationalisation took place in 2001, with the Inverclyde operations being sold to local management. Confusingly, the new operation was branded as McGill's Bus Services - the company name and operating licence having been purchased with McGill's of Barrhead - based in Port Glasgow, and employing a livery of blue, white and gold in the same styles as both Arriva and the GMS division, depending on what type of vehicle it was applied to. At the same time, the Barrhead depot, originally belonging to the initial McGill's Bus Service, was closed and operations concentrated on the two remaining depots.

In 2007, BAA awarded the new Glasgow Flyer 500 service to Arriva, which bought eleven specially liveried Wright Eclipse bodied Volvo B7RLEs for the service. As a result, the 905 Airlink service, jointly operated with Fairline Coaches under contract to Scottish Citylink, ended; however Fairline started their own independent service numbered 905.

In August 2010 the company, along with First Glasgow, were banned by the area Traffic Commissioner from registering any new services into Glasgow city centre for six months after being found guilty of breaching regulations by picking up and dropping off passengers at locations other than their designated bus stops. One other operator was also banned.

In December 2011, Arriva announced it had agreed to sell the business to McGill's Bus Services. The transaction was referred to the Competition Commission, before being approved in 2012.

== Fleet ==
Below is a list of each depot fleet before the sale to McGill's. Most buses were transferred over to McGill's as part of the deal when the assets of Arriva Scotland West were sold to McGill's.

=== Inchinnan Depot ===
Location: Inchinnan (Greenock Road)

- 2 Volvo B7RLE / Wright Eclipse
- 29 Dennis Dart SLF / Plaxton Pointer
- 3 DAF SB120 / Wright Cadet
- 2 VDL SB120 / Wright Cadet
- 10 VDL SB200/ Wright Pulsar 2
- 4 VDL SB200/ Wright Commander
- 6 Scania OmniLink

=== Johnstone Depot ===
Location: Johnstone (Cochranemill Road)

- 1 Dennis Dart / Northern Counties Paladin
- 16 Dennis Dart / Plaxton Pointer 1
- 54 Dennis Dart SLF / Alexander ALX200
- 23 Dennis Dart SLF / Plaxton Pointer
- 3 Mercedes-Benz Citaro
- 9 Volvo B7RLE / Wright Eclipse
- 2 DAF SB3000 / Van Hool Alizee
- 5 Scania N113 / East Lancs
- 2 Volvo B6 / Plaxton Pointer (Trainer vehicles)
- 3 Mercedes-Benz Vario / Plaxton Beaver
- 1 Optare MetroRider (Staff vehicle)
- 5 Volvo B10B / Wright Endurance
- 2 Volvo B6LE / Wright Crusader
- 2 Dennis Dart SLF / Wright Crusader
- 2 Dennis Dart SLF / East Lancs Spryte
