= Clydeside Scottish =

Scottish Transport Group bus operating subsidiary

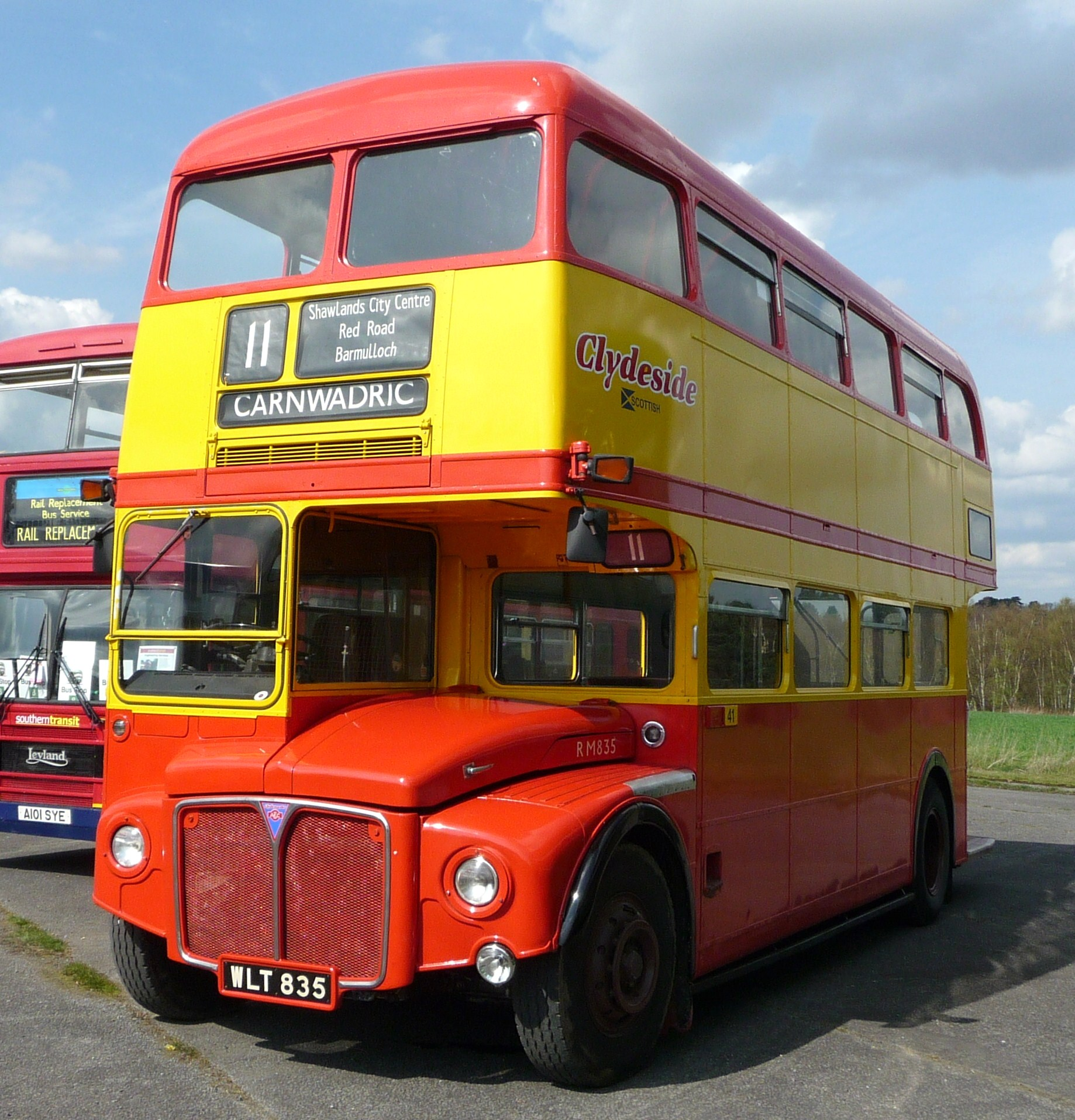
A preserved Clydeside Scottish AEC Routemaster

Clydeside Scottish Omnibuses Ltd was a bus operating subsidiary of the Scottish Transport Group formed in June 1985 from Western SMT Company Ltd. The company operated until May 1989, when it was remerged with Western Scottish, the successor company to Western SMT.

== Operation ==
From its head office in Paisley, Clydeside Scottish covered an operating area bounded by Largs in the south, the River Clyde to the north and the south side of Glasgow to the east. The company also operated services on the Isle of Bute. It was the largest operator in Inverclyde and Renfrewshire and had depots in Rothesay, Largs, Greenock, Johnstone, Inchinnan, Paisley and Thornliebank in the south of Glasgow. Its fleet numbered 334 buses when formed.

Clydeside Scottish also provided coaches for Scottish Citylink services between Gourock, Glasgow Airport, Glasgow and onward to Edinburgh.

== History ==
Clydeside Scottish was one of the shortest lived of the "new" Scottish Bus Group subsidiaries, lasting shortly under four years as a stand-alone company. Clydeside was created in preparation for the deregulation of the British bus industry in 1986, and eventual privatisation of the state-owned Scottish Bus Group (SBG). A bright red and yellow livery was introduced for the fleet, and a fleet name displayed in a style different from the corporate SBG look.

On deregulation, the company launched a network of services in the city of Glasgow, competing against the city operator Strathclyde Buses. A large number of two-person operated open-platform AEC Routemaster buses were purchased from London Transport for these services, which gave the company the advantage of giving change (as opposed to the exact fare the city operator demanded) without the buses having to linger at bus stops. The Routemasters operated on services into Paisley, Renfrew and Johnstone. Strathclyde Buses retaliated against the competition, however, by introducing routes beyond the city boundary and into Clydeside's operating territory.

A number of innovative marketing initiatives were introduced including ticketing, advertising, staff motivation and production of a story book "Rodney The Routemaster comes to Town" aimed at children.

While competing with the much larger Strathclyde Buses, Clydeside suffered an explosion of new operators in Paisley and in particular, Greenock. Clydeside found it increasingly difficult to compete against so many operators with much smaller operating costs. In May 1989 it was merged with Western Scottish. The Clydeside name was retained by Western as a trading name, but its red and yellow livery was replaced by Western black, white and red.

== Successor companies ==
The former Clydeside operations, with the exception of those on Bute, passed to a new company, Clydeside 2000 plc, on the privatisation of Western Scottish in October 1991, making the company the last of the Scottish Transport Group subsidiaries to be sold after three years of negotiations. Clydeside's new management and employees took a 76% stake in the new company, with Luton & District purchasing the remainder. The company scaled down its Glasgow operations, and the depots at Largs, Thornliebank and Paisley closed in the following three years.

Clydeside 2000 was taken over by British Bus in November 1994 (Luton & District had become part of British Bus a few months earlier); British Bus was subsequently acquired by the Cowie Group, later to become Arriva. Clydeside was renamed Arriva Scotland West, trading at the time as Arriva serving Scotland. Arriva expanded its Scottish operations with the purchase of McGill's Bus Service of Barrhead and Ashton Coaches of Greenock, although the Greenock operations of Arriva Scotland West were later demerged and sold to local management as McGill's Bus Services.

In December 2011 it was announced that Arriva had agreed a deal to sell its remaining Scottish operations to McGill's. The sale was completed in March 2012.

== See also ==
- List of bus operators of the United Kingdom
