= McGill's Midland Bluebird =

Bus operator in east and central Scotland

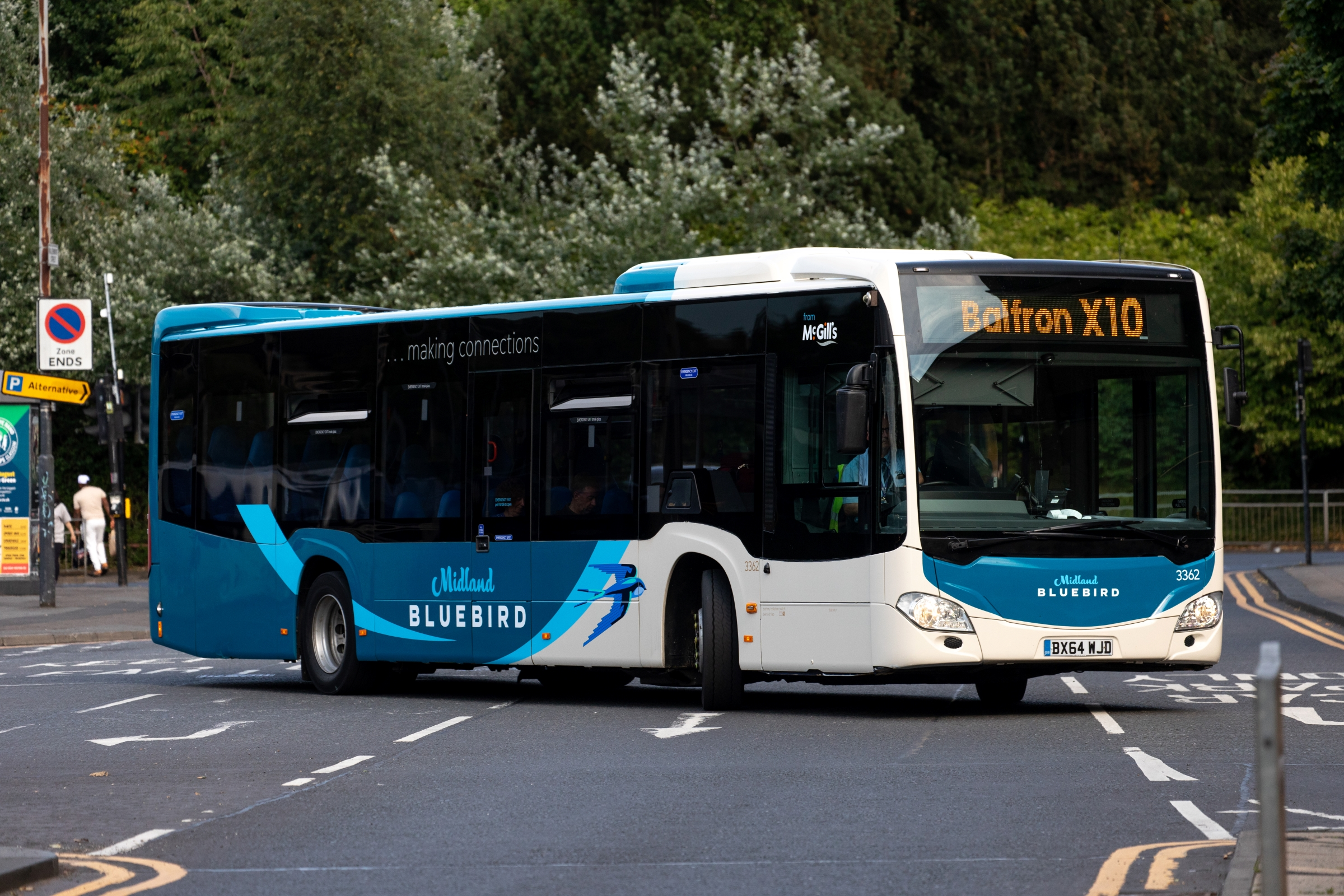
- Mercedes-Benz Citaro C2 in Glasgow city centre in July 2024
- Parent: McGill's Bus Services
- Founded: 19 September 2022; 4 years ago
- Headquarters: Larbert, Fife, Scotland
- Service area: Edinburgh; Falkirk; Stirling
- Service type: Bus and coach
- Routes: 25
- Depots: 2
- Fleet: 257 (September 2022)
- Chief executive: Tony Williamson
- Employees: 550 (September 2022)
- Website: www.mcgillsscotlandeast.co.uk

McGill's Midland Bluebird is a bus operator in Scotland mainly serving Falkirk and Stirling. The company is a subsidiary of McGill's Bus Services.

== History ==
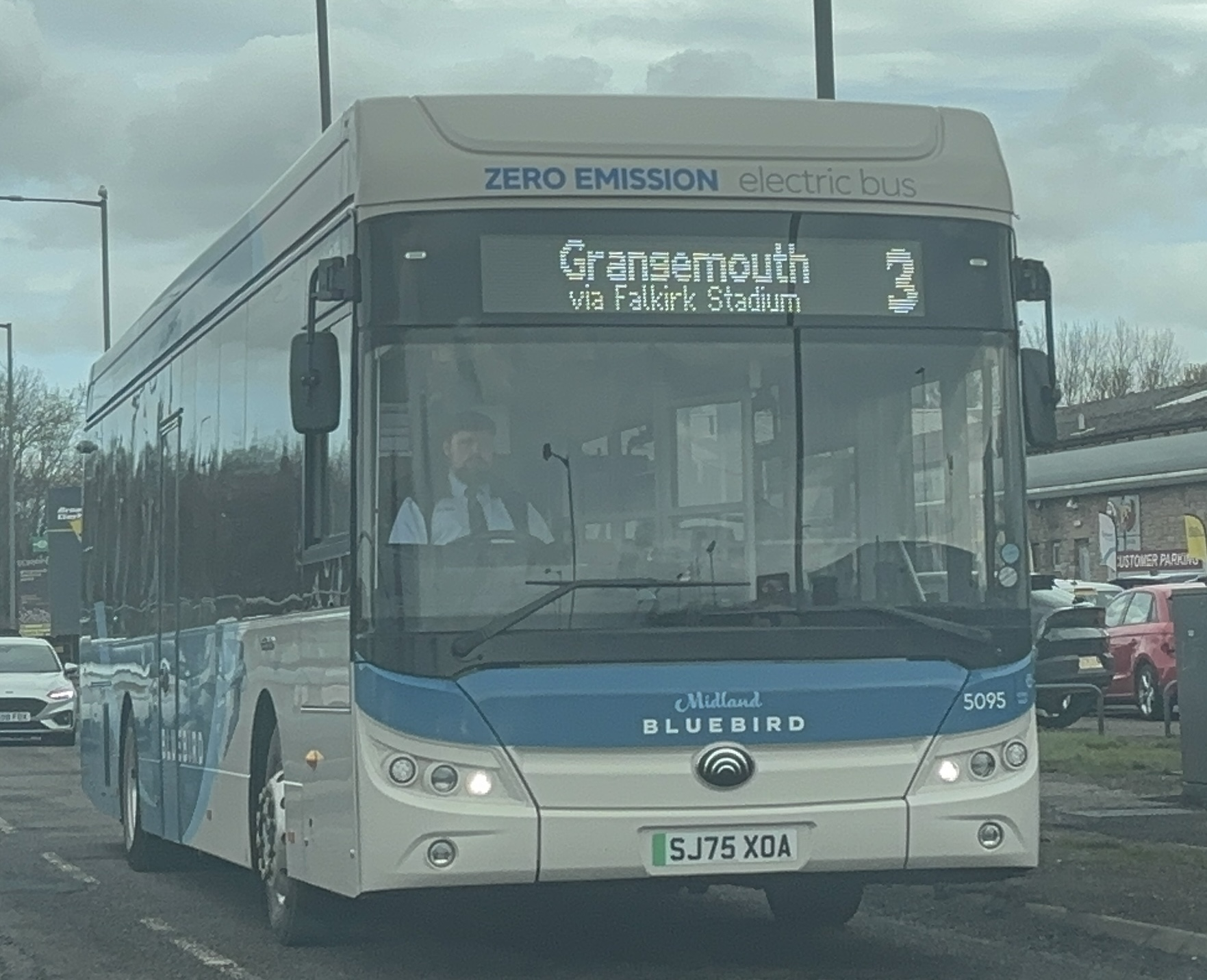
Yutong E12 in Falkirk in April 2026

On 6 September 2022, it was announced that McGill's had acquired the operations of First Scotland East from FirstGroup. The company was rebranded to McGill's Scotland East, which was further subdivided into McGill's Midland Bluebird (comprising the Balfron, Bannockburn and Larbert depots) and McGill's Eastern Scottish (comprising Livingston depot's local bus services). The sale, completed on 19 September 2022, saw McGill's take on 550 employees, four depots and a fleet of 257 buses from the FirstGroup, including the Bright Bus Tours open top bus tour operation in Edinburgh. Following the takeover, 120 of the buses acquired from First were deemed unsuitable for McGill's service and taken off the road, with some returning to service after repairs and some being replaced by vehicles transferred from other McGill's operations.

McGill's announced in September 2023 that it was to close down their McGill's Eastern Scottish operation and would start ceasing most operations on services in Edinburgh and West Lothian between October and December. The company cited issues with driver recruitment and low passenger patronage, as well as traffic congestion and competition with the railways and Lothian Buses had led to the Eastern Scottish operation becoming unsustainable to operate.

== Operations ==
McGill's Midland Bluebird operate services in Falkirk and Stirling and to surrounding communities.

In June 2025, the Bright Bus Tours routes were rebranded under the Big Bus Tours franchise. The company also operate Stirling's Sightseer open top bus.

=== X36/X37 ===
In August 2023, Midland Bluebird re-launched bus routes X36 and X37 (which runs from Stirling and Falkirk respectively to Buchanan Bus Station in Glasgow, via Cumbernauld) under the brand name 'CitySwift', with refurbished Alexander Dennis Enviro400 MMC double-decker buses fitted with new tables, USB-A and USB-C charging ports. The vehicles had been acquired with the purchase of First Scotland East. However, following swift legal proceedings from the Irish bus data management platform of the same name, in November 2023 decals were applied over the "City" section to rebrand the service as 'X36 X37 Swift'.

=== UniLink ===
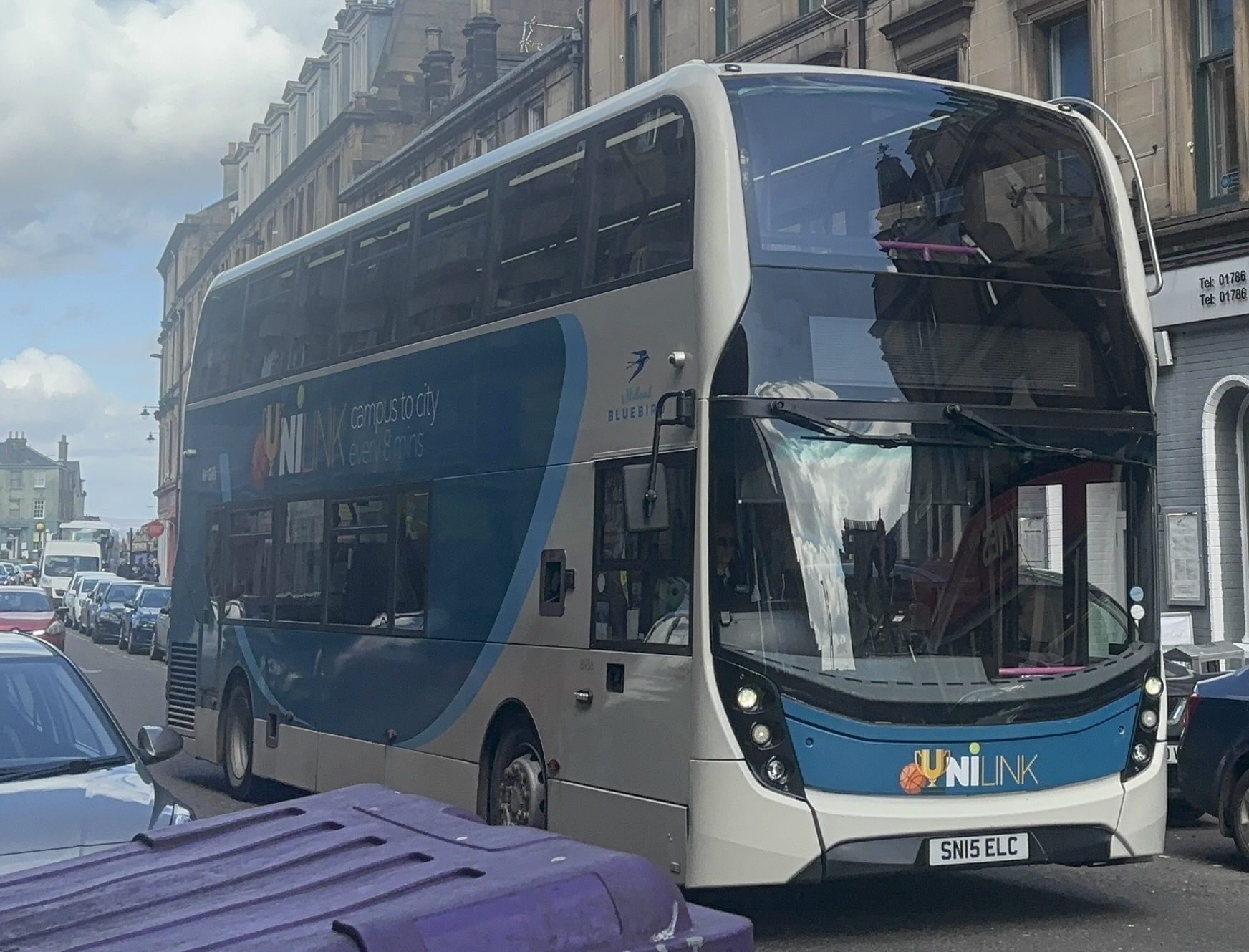
Enviro400 MMC on UniLink in Stirling during April 2026

'UniLink' runs between Stirling town centre and the campus of the University of Stirling. The route is run using Alexander Dennis Enviro400 MMCs.

== Fleet ==
As of September 2022, the fleet consisted of 257 buses.

During September 2025 Midland Bluebird started taking delivery of 30 new Yutong E12 electric buses for use mainly on route 38.
