= Wright Eclipse =

Single-deck bus body on Volvo low-floor chassis

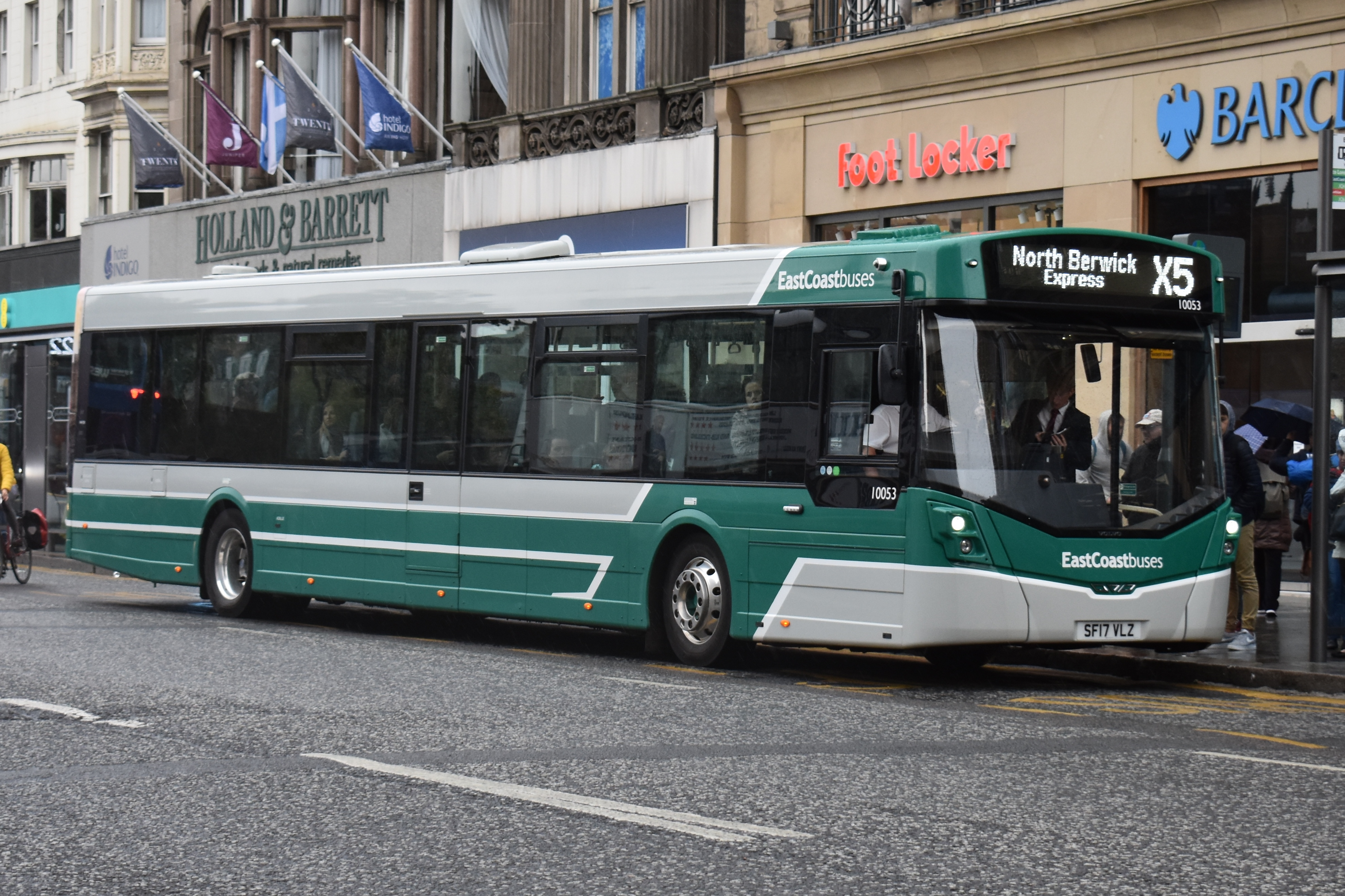
- East Coast Buses Wright Eclipse 3 bodied Volvo B8RLE in September 2018

Overview
- Manufacturer: Wrightbus
- Production: 2000–2020
- Assembly: Ballymena, Northern Ireland

Body and chassis
- Doors: 1 or 2
- Floor type: Low floor/low entry Step-entrance (Eclipse SchoolRun)
- Chassis: Volvo B7L; Volvo B7RLE; Volvo B7R; Volvo B8RLE
- Related: Wright Eclipse Fusion; Wright Eclipse Gemini

Powertrain
- Engine: B7L: D7C; B7R: D7C; B7RLE: D7C/D7E; B8RLE: D8K
- Transmission: Voith; ZF Friedrichshafen

Dimensions
- Length: 11.8 m (38 ft 9 in); 12.2 m (40 ft 0 in); 12.4 m (40 ft 8 in); 13.2 m (43 ft 4 in)
- Width: 2.5 m (8 ft 2 in)
- Height: 3 m (9 ft 10 in)

Chronology
- Predecessor: Wright Renown
- Successor: Wright GB Hawk

The Wright Eclipse is a low-floor single-deck bus body that was built by Wrightbus between 2000 and 2019. The second-generation Eclipse 2 was launched in 2008, followed by the third-generation Eclipse 3 in 2015. The Eclipse, and its sister design the Solar, were named for a solar eclipse which was visible in the UK in 1999, the year of its introduction.

The Eclipse was launched in 2000 on Volvo B7L chassis and, in 2003, the body was made available on the more popular Volvo B7RLE chassis. A coach version, the Eclipse SchoolRun, was later launched on high floor Volvo B7R chassis. In November 2008, Wright unveiled the Eclipse 2 at that year's Euro Bus Expo, with front and rear ends facelifted to match the Wright StreetCar. In 2015, the Eclipse 3 was launched on Volvo B8RLE chassis, the successor to the B7RLE.

A double-decker version of the Eclipse was also available, known as the Wright Eclipse Gemini, as well as an articulated version known as the Wright Eclipse Fusion.

== First generation (2000–2010) ==
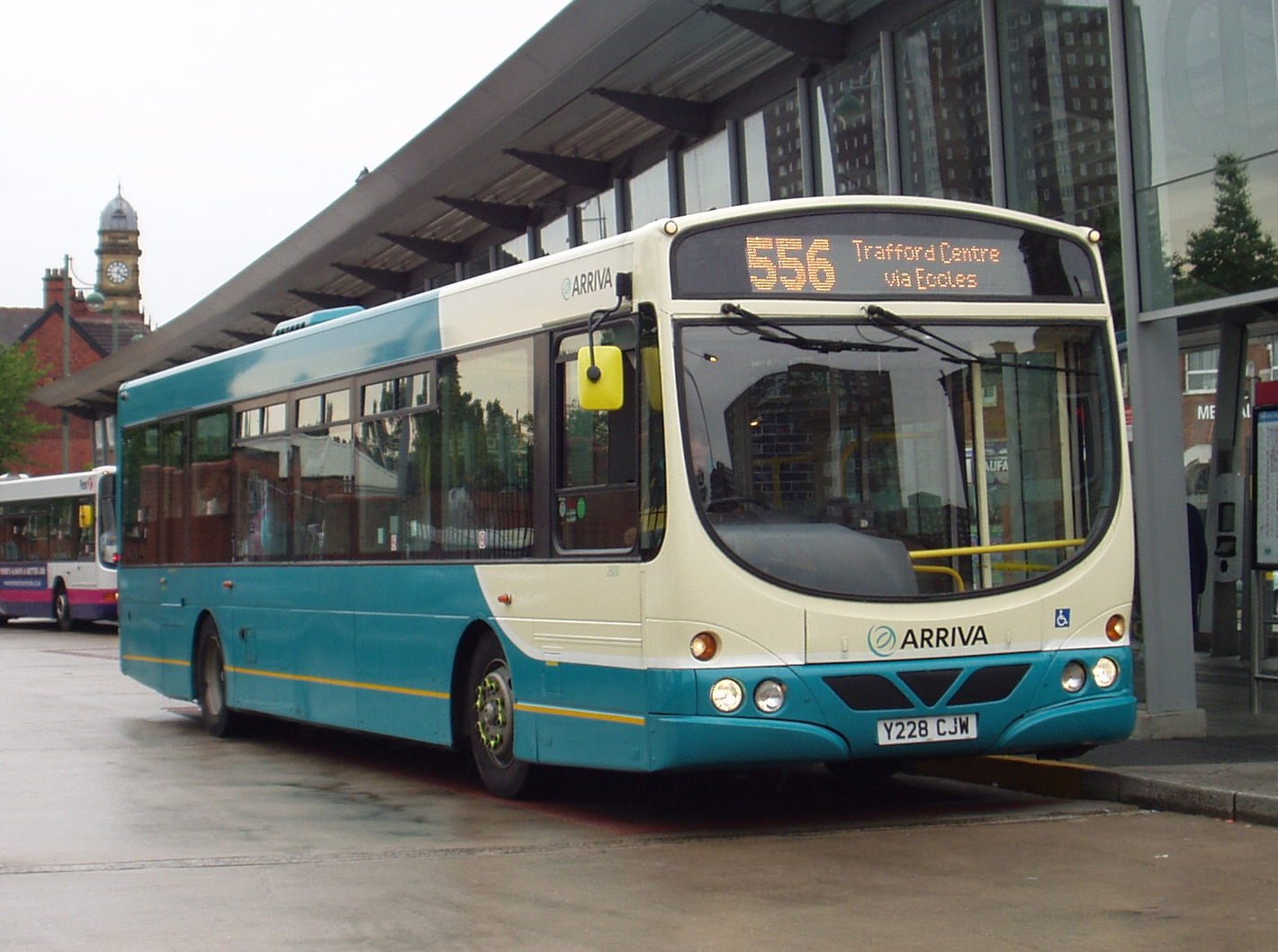
Arriva North West Wright Eclipse Metro bodied Volvo B7L in June 2008

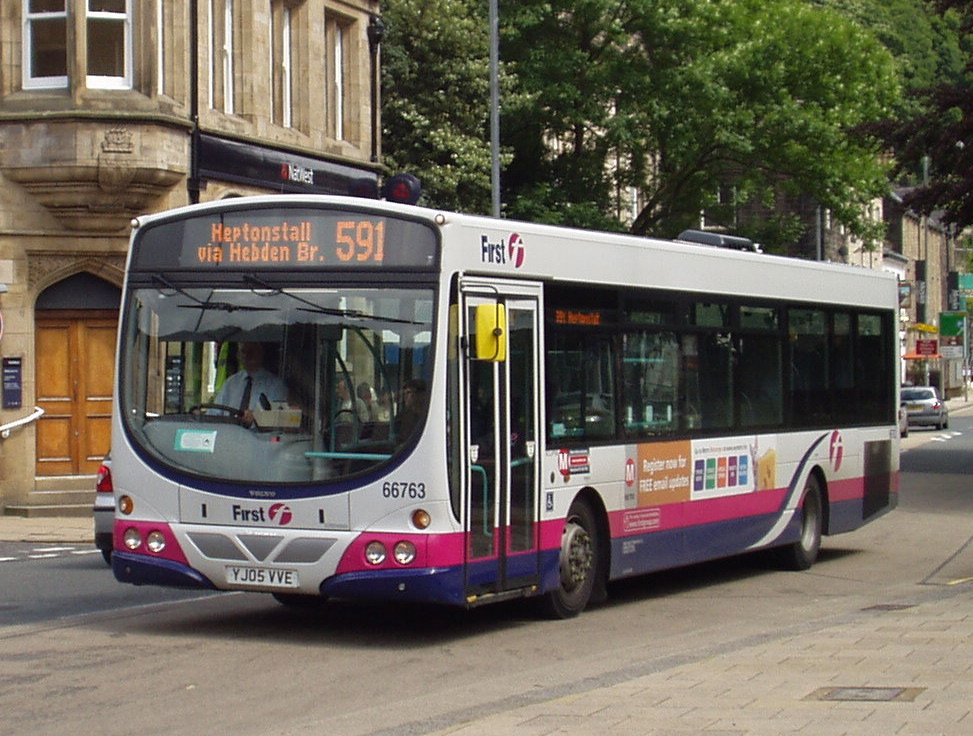
First West Yorkshire Wright Eclipse Urban bodied Volvo B7RLE in July 2007

The first generation Wright Eclipse was launched in 2000 by Wrightbus on Volvo B7L chassis as the replacement for the Wright Renown bodywork on the older Volvo B10BLE chassis. Both a bi-axle and tri-axle variant were offered, however only the former was ever built.

However, sales of the B7L were lower than anticipated in the United Kingdom, owing to its unusual engine layout; as a result, the Eclipse Urban was launched on Volvo B7RLE chassis in 2003, which consequently saw the original B7L bodywork renamed to the Eclipse Metro.

As well as being the largest operator of the Eclipse Metro, the FirstGroup were the largest operators of the Wright Eclipse Urban. 253 Eclipse Urbans were ordered for First Greater Manchester between 2004 and 2006, with other significant orders within the group, among others, delivered to First Glasgow, First West Yorkshire and First West of England, as well as for First's airside shuttle services at Belfast City Airport. Lothian Buses were another popular customer for the Eclipse Urban, with deliveries commencing in 2004; five of these Urbans were used on Edinburgh's guided busway system until it was replaced by the Edinburgh Tram. 38 Urbans were delivered to Travel West Midlands during 2006.

Arriva UK Bus were also a large purchaser of Eclipse Urbans. Notably, 22 were delivered across two batches to Arriva Southern Counties' Fastrack bus rapid transit scheme in 2006 and 2007; these were equipped with audio-visual next stop announcements, air conditioning and CCTV. Elsewhere, Arriva Yorkshire took delivery of 13 Eclipse Urbans in August 2008, and Arriva Scotland West took eleven Urbans, featuring branding for the Glasgow Flyer service and specified with high-specification interiors, in late 2007.

Blazefield Group subsidiary Keighley & District first took delivery of 14 Eclipse Urban bodied Volvo B7RLEs in April 2005, branded as 'the shuttle' for use on route 662 between Keighley and Bradford in competition with regional rail services. These Urbans followed a similar specification to the double-deck Wright Eclipse Geminis delivered for Harrogate bus route 36 a year prior, featuring leather seats with improved legroom and tinted windows, and a red and white route-branded exterior livery with the front of the bus painted in chrome effect paint. A further eight were delivered to Keighley & District for conventional services in 2008, while Blackburn Transport took delivery of 25 during 2007 to aid the company's rebranding to 'SpotOn' following its purchase by Transdev.

Smaller operators of the Eclipse Urban included East Yorkshire Motor Services, who took delivery of 10 between 2005 and 2006 for use on both park and ride and urban services in Kingston upon Hull, Lincolnshire RoadCar, who took delivery of six in 2005 for services in Skegness, Go North East, who took delivery of five in early 2005 for services between Sunderland and South Shields, Whitelaw's of Stonehouse, who took delivery of five in 2004, and Perryman's Coaches of Berwick upon Tweed and Hedingham Omnibuses, each taking delivery of a single Eclipse Urban in 2004 and 2005 respectively.

The only export operator for both the Eclipse and Eclipse Urban was state-owned Irish bus operator Bus Éireann, taking delivery of 48 Eclipse Urbans during 2007.

=== Eclipse Commuter ===
Stagecoach West Scotland Wright Eclipse Commuter bodied Volvo B7RLE in Castle Douglas in July 2014

Wrightbus also marketed a longer distance and intercity variant of the Eclipse, named the Eclipse Commuter and built on a version of the B7RLE chassis, which had the higher floor section extended to the front axle of the bus. The design included all of the features of a standard coach, such as under-floor storage and a high seating position, while maintaining a small low floor section for passengers in wheelchairs. The first entered service with Ulsterbus in April 2004 while Yorkshire Coastliner ordered six, which never entered service, and Stagecoach West Scotland ordered two, supplied with funding with Dumfries and Galloway Council.

=== Eclipse SchoolRun ===
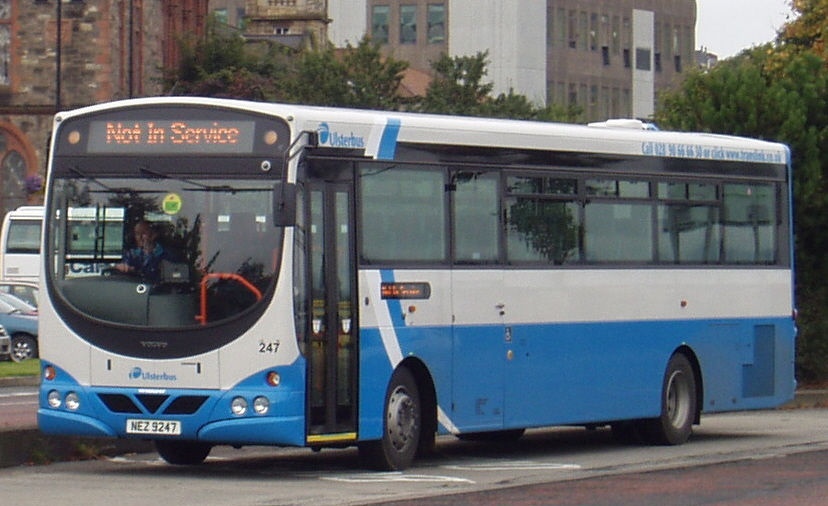
Ulsterbus Wright Eclipse SchoolRun bodied Volvo B7R in Derry in September 2007

In 2006, Wrightbus launched the Eclipse SchoolRun; effectively an entirely high floor version of the Eclipse Commuter, bodied on Volvo B7R coach chassis. The Eclipse SchoolRun was mainly intended for school bus work. Northern Ireland bus operator Ulsterbus were the only customer to order the Eclipse SchoolRun, initially taking delivery of 160 of the type in their first batch order between 2007 and 2008, with an additional batch of 61 Eclipse SchoolRuns delivered to the operator between 2009 and 2010.

The first 110 Eclipse SchoolRuns delivered between 2007 and 2008 were specified with 66 seats in a 2+3 layout, with several seats at the front of the bus capable of being removed to make room for wheelchairs; the latter 50 buses were delivered with 62 seats and a permanent wheelchair area to save time reconfiguring the seating arrangement. The second batch of 61 buses were delivered to Ulsterbus in this latter configuration between 2009 and 2010.

== Second generation (2008–2018) ==
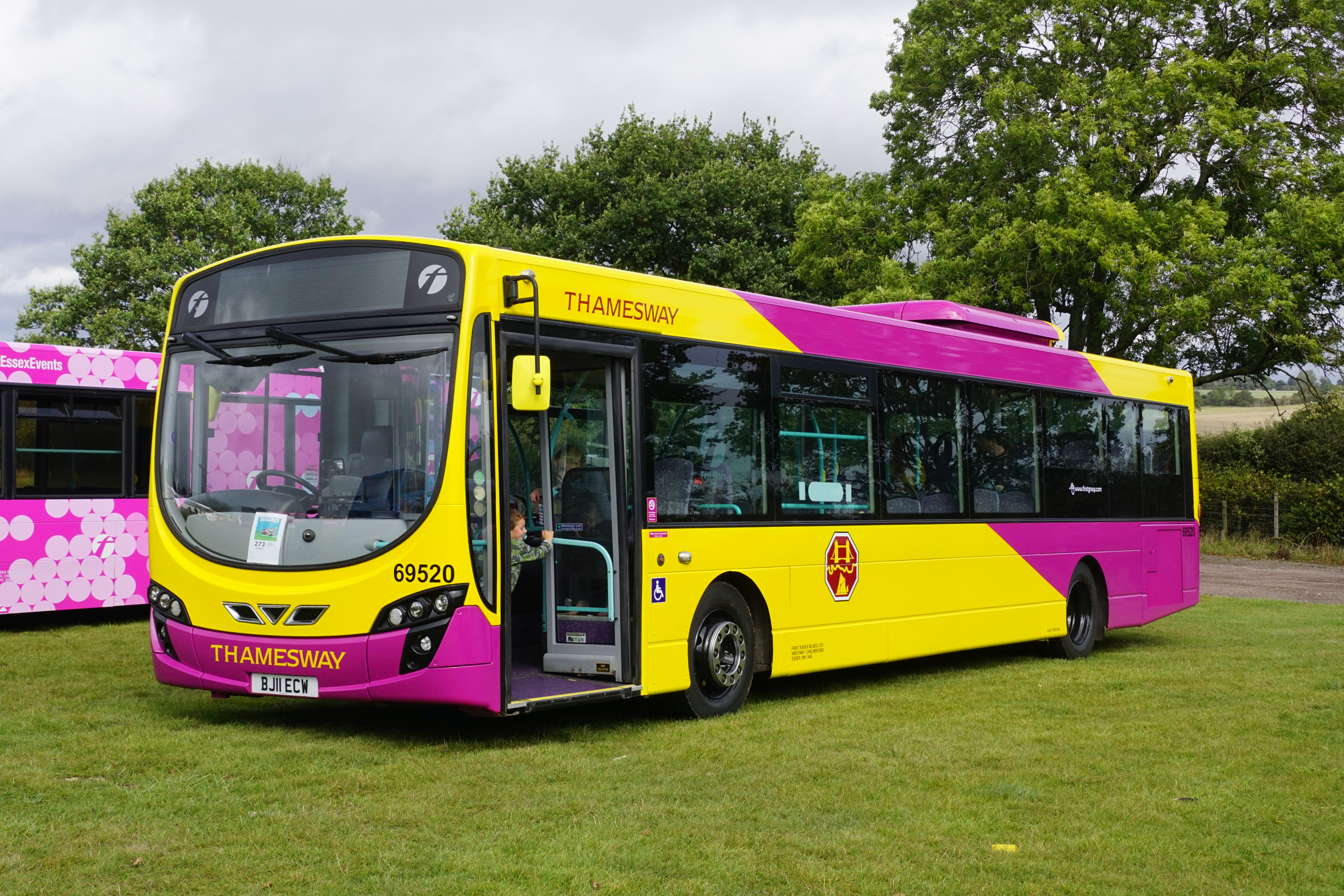
First Essex Volvo B7RLE Wright Eclipse Urban 2 69520 in 1990s Thamesway Badgerline heritage livery at Showbus 2019, Hertfordshire Showground

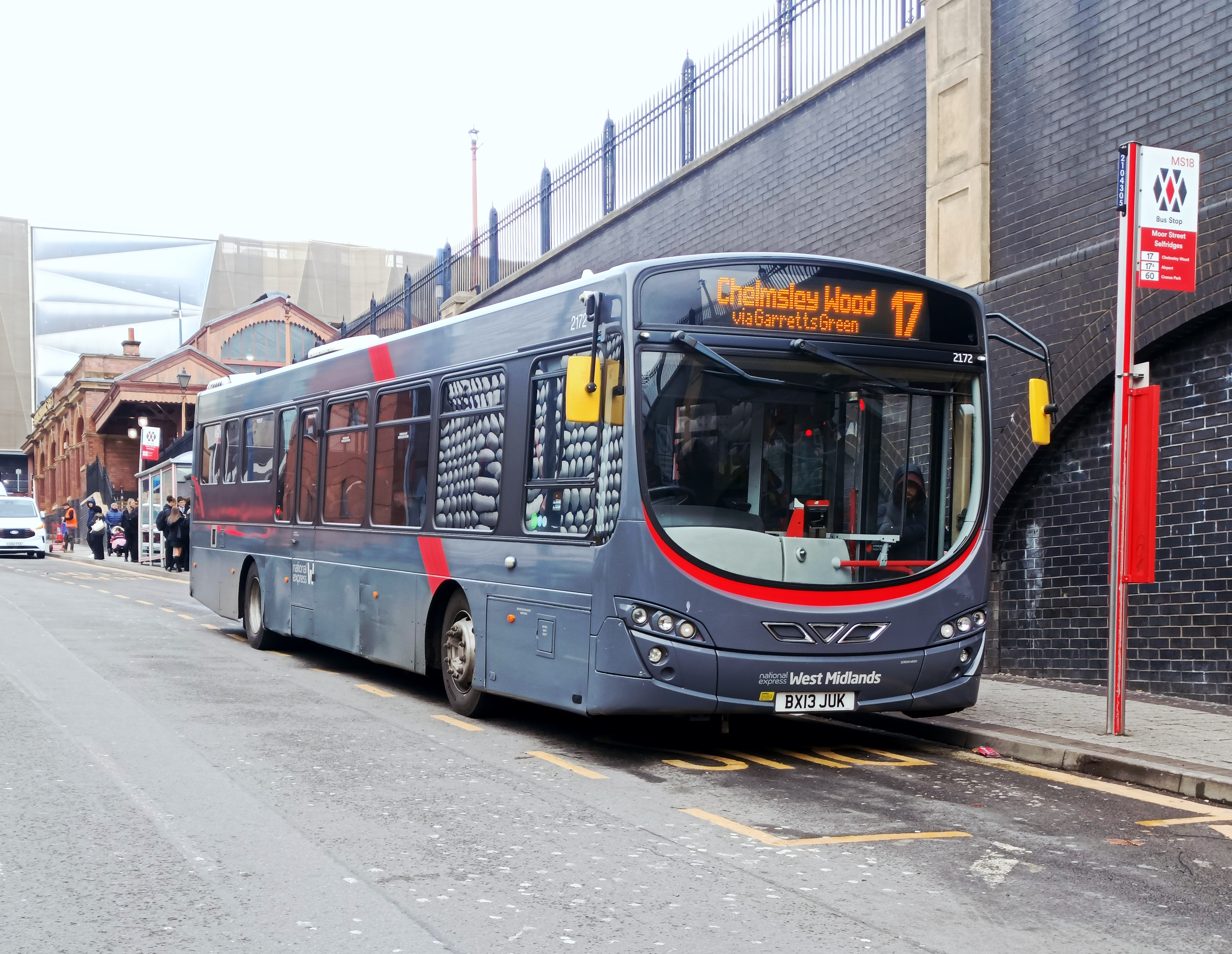
National Express West Midlands Wright Eclipse Urban 2 bodied Volvo B7RLE in November 2025

The second generation Wright Eclipse, known as the Eclipse Urban 2, was launched at the 2008 Euro Bus Expo as the successor to the Eclipse Urban, although the two designs were produced concurrently until 2009. The Eclipse 2 features a facelifted front fascia and rear end, and was available exclusively on the Volvo B7RLE chassis. The Burnley Bus Company were the first customer to take delivery of the Wright Eclipse Urban 2, with nineteen delivered for the operator's 'Mainline' services in 2009.

The Urban 2 proved popular again with the National Express Group's bus operations, with 147 delivered to National Express West Midlands between 2011 and 2013, 23 of these being delivered to National Express Coventry in 2013, and a further 27 delivered to National Express Dundee in 2011.

Smaller numbers of Urban 2s were sold to FirstGroup operators, with First West Yorkshire receiving ten in 2013 for services in Huddersfield. Arriva Shires & Essex had eleven Urban 2s equipped with guidewheels delivered for service on the Luton to Dunstable Busway in 2012, while ten Urban 2s were delivered to the Go-Ahead Group's Plymouth Citybus subsidiary in April 2012. with 36 were subsequently delivered to morebus in July 2012. Eighteen Urban 2s specified with centre exit doors were also delivered to Metrobus of Crawley in August 2014 for use on the Fastway bus rapid transit scheme.

Municipally-owned operators of the Urban 2 included Lothian Buses, who took delivery of 25 between 2010 and 2013, Network Warrington, who took delivery of twelve in July 2009, and Rossendale Transport, who took delivery of eight in February 2010. Independent Urban 2 operators include McGill's Bus Services, who took delivery of ten Urban 2s in 2011, Minsterley Motors of Annscroft, who took delivery of six in February 2012, Celtic Travel of Llanidloes, who took delivery of three Urban 2s also in early 2012, and Henry Cooper Coaches of Annitsford, who took delivery of a single Urban 2 in September 2010.

A batch of Urban 2s equipped with air conditioning were leased to Malta Public Transport in 2014.

== Third generation (2015–2019) ==
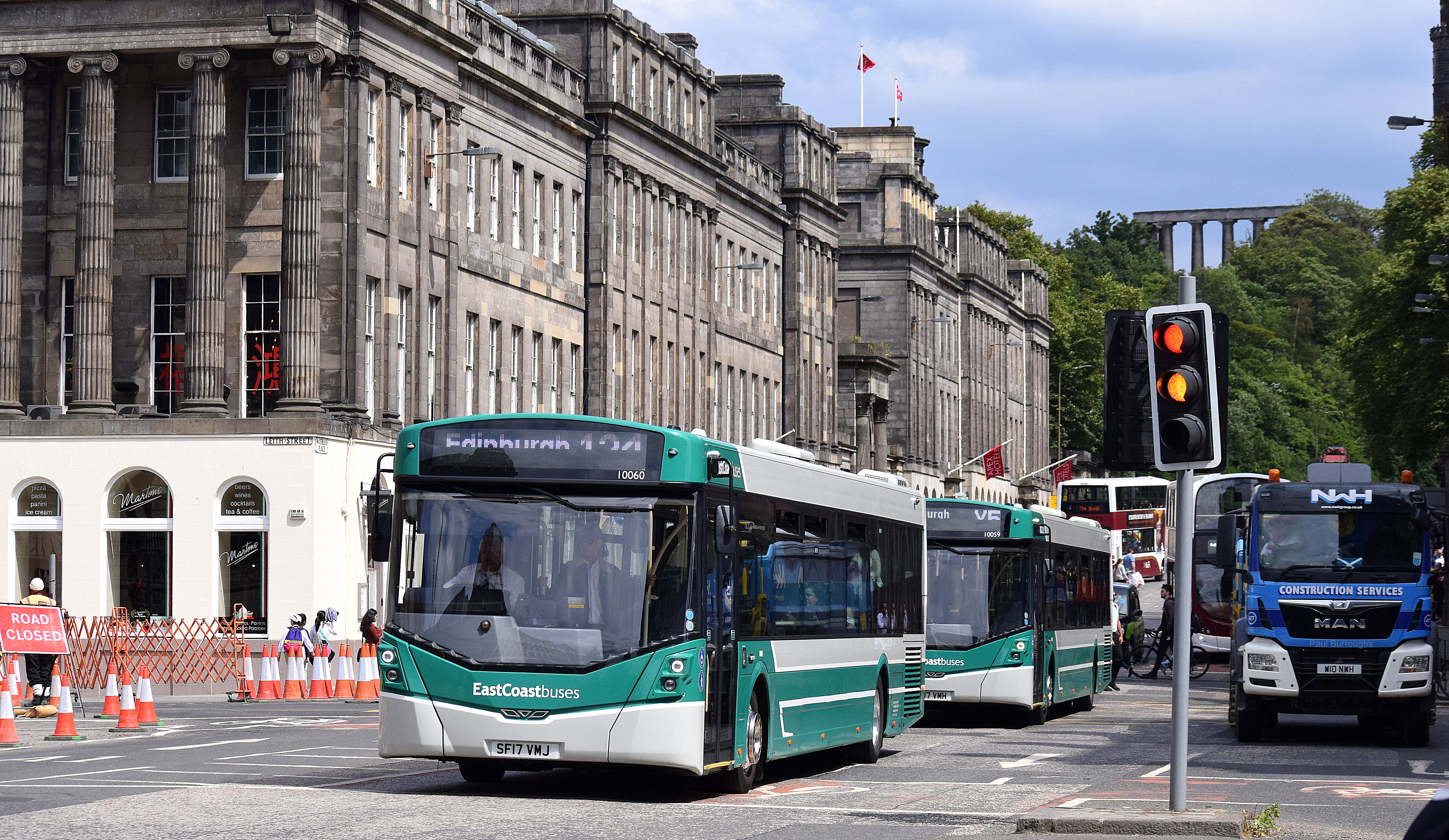
East Coast Buses Wright Eclipse 3 bodied Volvo B8RLE in July 2018

The third generation Eclipse, known as the Eclipse 3, was launched in 2015. The Eclipse 3 was only available on Volvo B8RLE chassis, the successor to the B7RLE. As well as the difference in chassis, the front and rear ends initially underwent a minor facelift, incorporating design features from the Wright StreetLite integral design. The first Eclipse 3s entered service with Trentbarton in October 2015 and the second batch by Stagecoach in the Fens for the Cambridgeshire Busway. The front design was revised further in spring 2017 with the first (and only) 13.2 metres (43 ft) examples being purchased by East Coast Buses. The first 11.8 metres (39 ft) variant with the revised bodywork has since entered service with Delaine Buses.
