= Western Scottish =

Scottish Bus Group operator in west Scotland

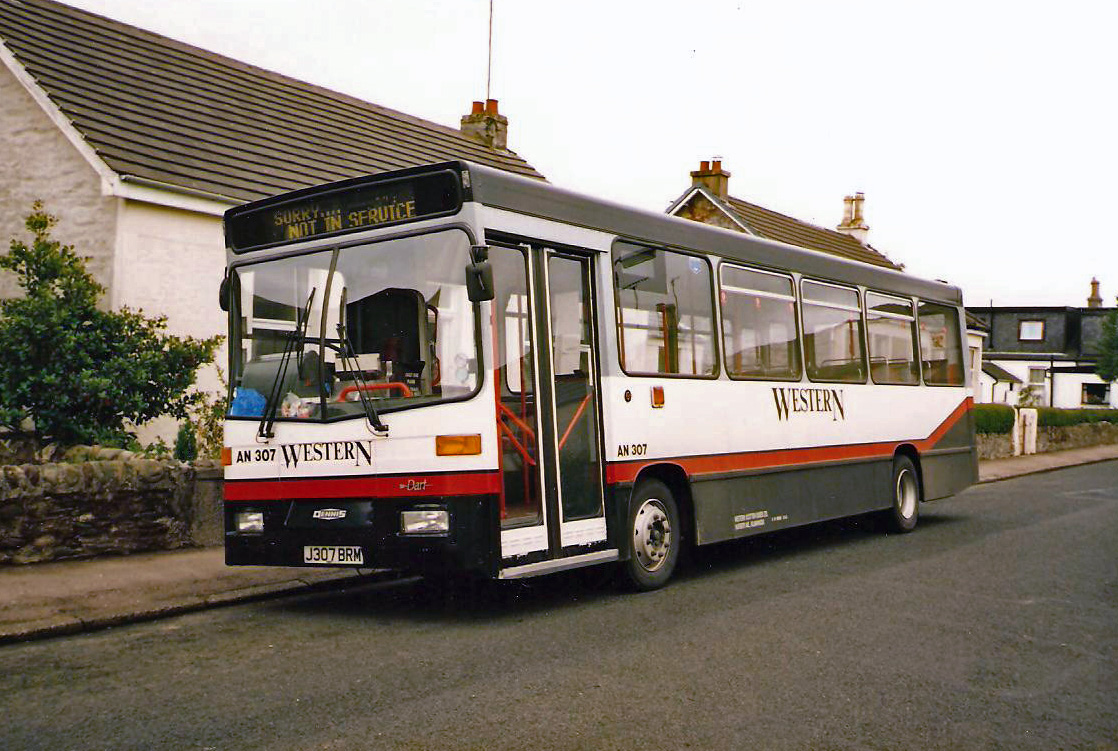
- Alexander Dash bodied Dennis Dart in Dunoon in 1993
- Parent: Scottish Bus Group (1985–1991)
- Founded: June 1985; 40 years ago
- Defunct: July 1994; 31 years ago
- Headquarters: Kilmarnock, East Ayrshire, Scotland
- Service area: Ayrshire; Dumfries and Galloway; Cumbria, England; Glasgow
- Service type: Bus and coach
- Depots: 13 (December 1990)
- Fleet: 661 (December 1990)

Western Scottish Omnibuses Ltd was a bus operating subsidiary of the Scottish Bus Group formed in June 1985 from Western SMT and operated until 1997, when it became Western Buses Ltd. This successor company is now a part of Stagecoach South Scotland.

== History ==
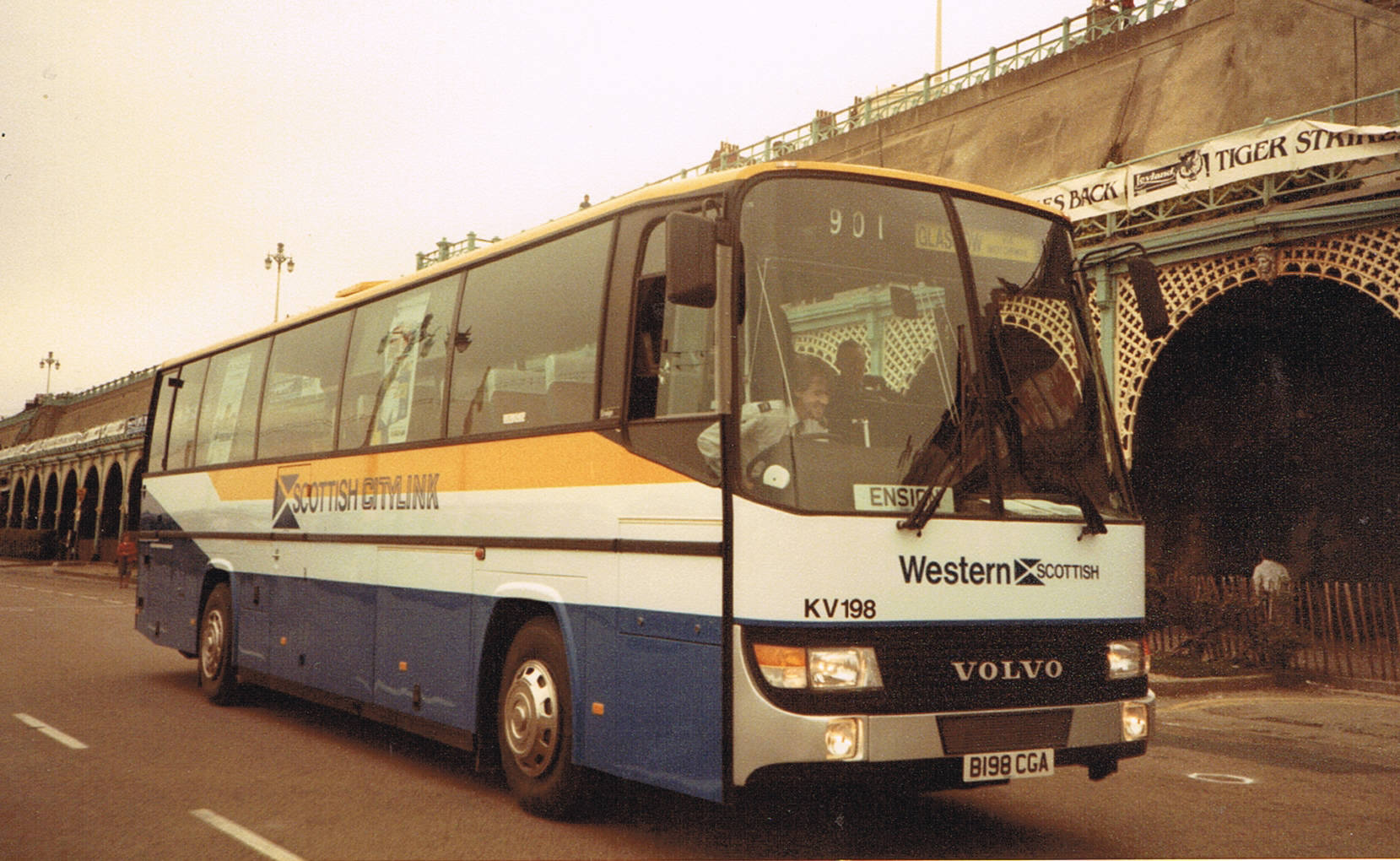
Scottish Citylink Berkhof bodied Volvo B10M operated by Western Scottish at a coach rally in Brighton

In November 1984, the Scottish Bus Group (SBG) announced it was introducing a new devolved management structure for its seven bus companies, including Western SMT, which had its legal name changed to Western Scottish Ltd. The new structure, incorporating four new SBG subsidiaries in preparation for bus deregulation and the ensuing privatisation of the SBG, was launched in June 1985, seeing the northern portion of Western SMT's operations in Inverclyde, Renfrewshire and the Isle of Bute ceded to a new company, Clydeside Scottish.

This left Western Scottish, operating from a head office in Nursery Avenue, Kilmarnock, with an operating area bounded by Ardrossan in the north, Glasgow to the east, the Firth of Clyde to the west and Carlisle across the English border to the south. Western Scottish also provided coaches for Scottish Citylink work, mainly from the south west of Scotland to Glasgow, Edinburgh, London and southern England.

Following deregulation in October 1986, Western suffered from heavy competition, particularly around Kilmarnock and Ayr, which, as the heavier populated areas of its operating area, provided the firm with the bulk of its income. Keenan of Ayr, Carrick Coaches, Shuttle Buses and various smaller operators appeared, challenging and weakening the dominant operator. In May 1989, by order of the Secretary of State for Transport Paul Channon to make the companies more competitive in and around Glasgow, Clydeside Scottish was remerged with Western Scottish, with depots at Largs, Greenock, Paisley, Johnstone, Inchinnan, Rothesay and Thornliebank on the south side of Glasgow being acquired.

Western Scottish became the eighth SBG subsidiary to be placed up for sale in December 1990, having incurred £2.1 million (equivalent to £6,599,000 in 2023) in losses during 1989, and in October 1991, Western Scottish was sold in a management buyout, followed by an immediate onward sale of the Clydeside operations and their depots to a management buyout team consortium financially backed by Luton & District, forming Clydeside 2000. Depots in Largs and Ardrossan were closed shortly afterward.

The newly privatised Western Scottish was successful in securing all tenders by Strathclyde Regional Council for bus services on the Isle of Arran, putting the future of Brodick-based independent Arran Transport in jeopardy and drawing criticism from locals and the local media. However, Arran Transport managed to stay in business by competing in a bus war against Western Scottish on its home island and also the neighbouring Isle of Bute. In its home town of Kilmarnock, Western faced increasing levels of competition, most notably from Clyde Coast Coaches Ltd of Ardrossan, and retaliated by offering a free service between Saltcoats and Largs, Clyde Coast's traditional route.

In 1993, a small operation was established in Dunoon when Western Scottish won one tendered local service. Two Dennis Dart vehicles were stationed there until two years later, when further routes were won and a depot running around 15 buses was opened there.

=== Stagecoach ownership ===
In July 1994, Western Scottish was purchased by Stagecoach Holdings for £6 million (equivalent to £15,074,000 in 2023). Trading as Stagecoach Western Scottish, the company began expanding when Arran Transport was purchased in October 1994, followed by the much larger A1 Service operation in January 1995, adding some 80 vehicles and operations in North Ayrshire from a new depot in Ardrossan. Stagecoach responded fiercely to the competition in Western's operating area and was banned by the Traffic Commissioner from operating on the Ayr to Dalmellington route for a period of one year, due to predatory and uncompetitive action against competitor Carrick Coaches. For the period of this ban, AA Buses, the bus operations of coaching independent Dodd's of Troon, registered a new service for the one-year period, matching the service that Stagecoach Western was forced to withdraw.

Stagecoach was also forced to withdraw from a co-operative service run from Ayr to Greenock with Clyde Coast, Clydeside and AA Buses. A new operator, Ashton Coaches, had successfully pioneered the 585 Coastliner service from Ayr to Greenock. As this partially competed with services provided by Clyde Coast, Clydeside, AA Buses and Stagecoach Western Scottish, these operators provided two vehicles each, branded 535 Coastlink, and operated to the same timetable as the competition.

1995 also saw the purchase of the bus operations of Clyde Coast, and in May 1997, AA Buses was also purchased, together with the bus operations of Shuttle Buses, adding services around Kilwinning, Irvine and Troon to the Western operation. At that time, the head office was moved to Sandgate Bus Station in Ayr, and the company name changed to Western Buses Ltd in the process.
