= Unilink (Stirling bus route) =

Bus route in Stirling, Scotland

UL
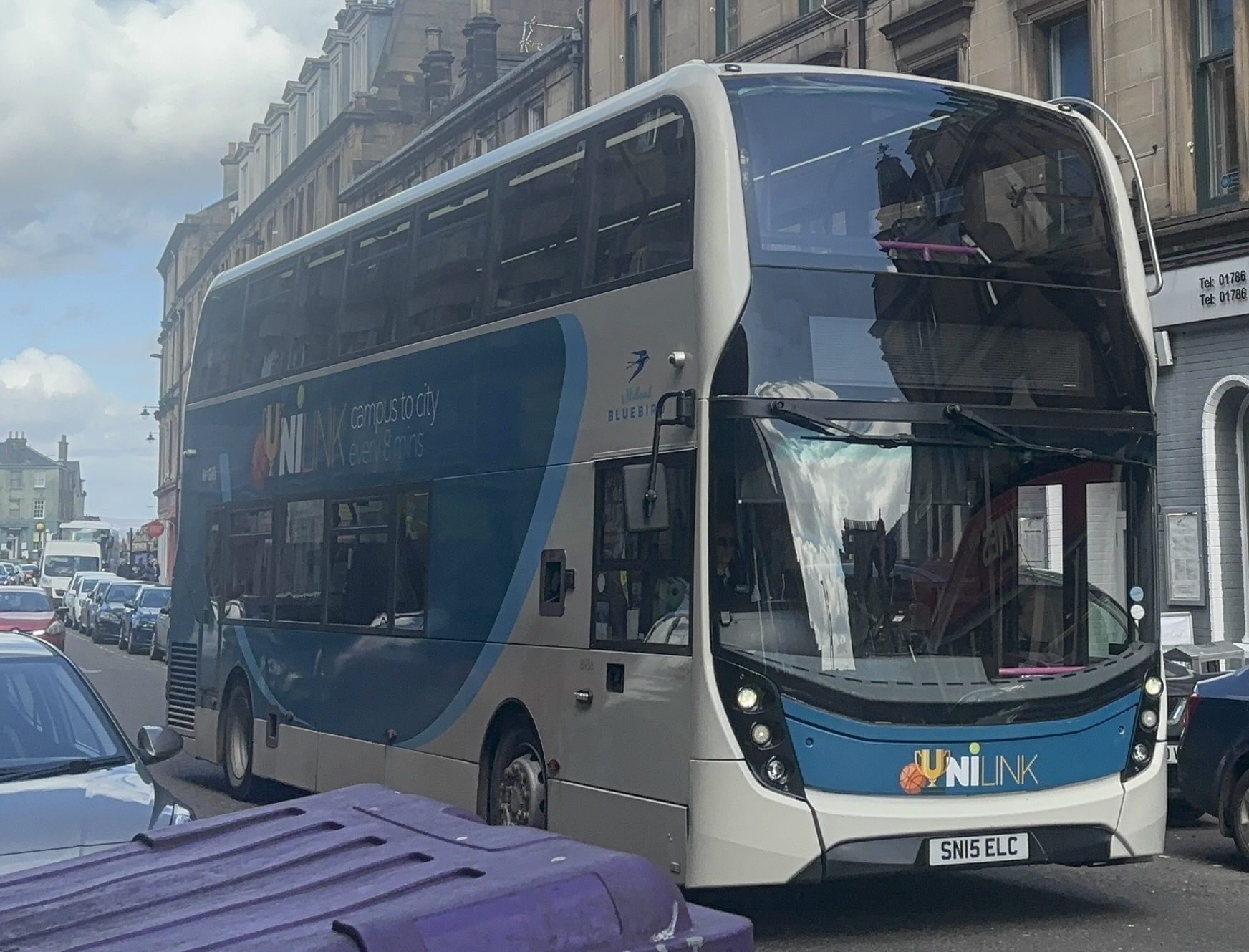
- UniLink Enviro400 MMC at Stirling City Centre during April 2026.

Overview
- Operator: McGill's Midland Bluebird
- Vehicle: Alexander Dennis Enviro400 MMC
- Peak vehicle requirement: 4
- Status: In service
- Former operator: First Scotland East

Route
- Start: Stirling
- End: University of Stirling campus

Service
- Frequency: Every 10 minutes
- Operates: Daily

Unilink is a bus route that runs between Stirling city centre and the University of Stirling campus. The route had branded orange and navy buses, before McGill's changed the livery to a light blue. The livery on the UniLink design Alexander Dennis Enviro400 MMCs features the UniLink logo alongside a series of images associated with the University of Stirling. These include sporting equipment, reflecting the university's longstanding designation as Scotland's University for Sporting Excellence, as well as a toast and baked beans design ("bean there, done that!"). It is operated by McGill's Midland Bluebird (formerly First Scotland East).

== History ==
In 2015, a fleet of five new Alexander Dennis Enviro400 MMC double-decker buses were deployed on the route.

In November 2018 the route changed from arriving at the university on West Link road to arriving at the newly built university bus hub.

In February 2022, the route was extended to serve Alexander Court. The same year, First introduced a new livery for buses operating the service, these buses were briefly used in Glasgow by First after they ceased operations in Stirling.

In September 2022, the night service was re-introduced. Shortly after, operation of the route was taken over by McGill's Midland Bluebird.
