= Western SMT =

Scottish bus operator

Western Scottish Motor Traction Co. Limited
- Predecessor: Scottish General Transport Co. Ltd
- Founded: 1929; 97 years ago
- Defunct: 1985
- Fate: Split into Clydeside Scottish and Western Scottish

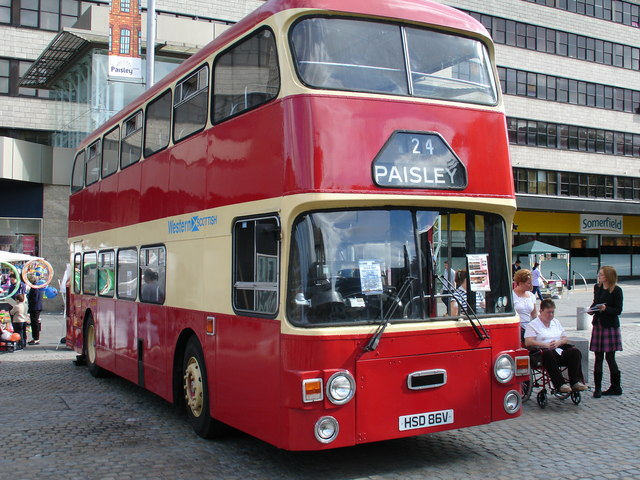
Western SMT no. R86, a Leyland Fleetline FE30AGR with Alexander bodywork, new in 1980

Western Scottish Motor Traction Co. Limited was a bus operator in south-west Scotland from 1929 to 1985.

The company was formed in 1929 by the renaming of Scottish General Transport Co. Ltd, after the British Electric Traction subsidiary formed in 1913 was acquired by the Scottish Motor Traction group. The SMT group was nationalised in 1949, and Western SMT became part of the Scottish Bus Group. In preparation for privatisation, the company was split into Clydeside Scottish and Western Scottish in 1985.

In 1984 the company operated buses from depots in the following locations:

- Ayr, with sub-depot at Girvan
- Cumnock
- Dumfries, with sub-depots at Annan, Kirkcudbright and Lockerbie
- Carlisle
- Greenock
- Inchinnan
- Johnstone, with sub-depot at Largs
- Kilmarnock
- Thornliebank, with sub-depot at Ardrishaig
- Paisley
- Port Ellen on Islay
- Rothesay
- Stranraer, with sub-depot at Wigtown

== Sources ==
- Wilson, David G., ed. (April 1980). Fleetbook 13: Buses of Western Scotland (2nd ed.). Manchester: A.M. Witton. ISBN 0-86047-132-2.
- A.W. Neuls, National Bus Company and Scottish Bus Group Fleet List, Shepperton, 1984
