= McGill's Bus Services =

Bus operator based in Scotland

McGill's Bus Service Ltd.
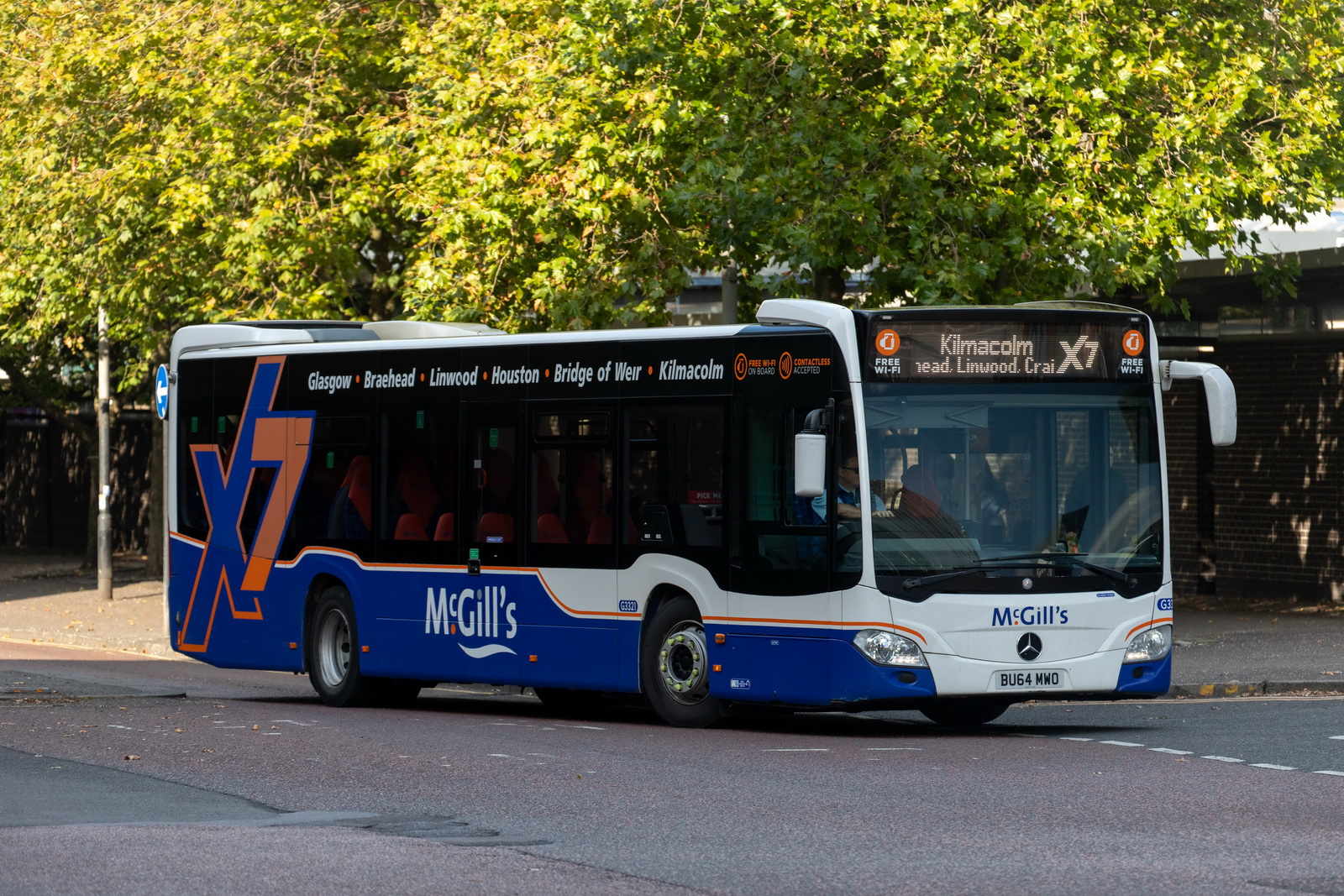
- A McGill's Mercedes-Benz Citaro in Glasgow city centre in September 2022
- Founded: 1933; 93 years ago
- Headquarters: Greenock, Scotland, UK
- Service area: Inverclyde; Renfrewshire; Glasgow City; North Ayrshire; East Ayrshire; North Lanarkshire; South Lanarkshire; Dundee City; Perth and Kinross; West Lothian; Stirling; Falkirk; City of Edinburgh; Aberdeen
- Service type: Bus and coach services
- Routes: 86
- Depots: Inchinnan, Johnstone, Greenock, Dundee, Livingston, Larbert, Bannockburn, Balfron
- Fleet: 441+ (January 2021)
- Chief executive: Tony Williamson
- Website: mcgillsbuses.co.uk

McGill's Bus Services is a bus operator based in Greenock, Scotland. The company has grown to operate a network of routes covering much of the council areas of Inverclyde, East Renfrewshire, Renfrewshire, North Lanarkshire, Glasgow City, North Ayrshire, West Lothian, Falkirk and Dundee City. McGill's have several depots based in Greenock, Inchinnan, Johnstone, Edinburgh, Bannockburn, Balfron, Larbert, Livingston and Dundee. McGill's also formerly had depots in Dumbarton, Barrhead and Coatbridge.

McGill's is the largest independent bus operator in the United Kingdom, as well as being named a Scottish Insider top 500 company in January 2016, coming in at 350th place.

== History ==
=== Early years (1933–2004) ===
The name "McGill's Bus Services" first came into use in 1933. This company was based in Barrhead and was owned by the McGill family. It expanded significantly during the years leading up to bus deregulation, but in July 1997, sold out to the major operator in the area, Clydeside 2000, in the face of significant competition from independent minibus operators. McGill's initially retained its identity, but was later rebranded as Arriva Scotland West. Another company, Greenock based Ashton Coaches (trading as GMS), was also acquired by Clydeside in the same month.

In July 2001, Arriva decided to withdraw from its Inverclyde operations, which were loss-making and was facing significant competition from independent operators. Its Greenock depot was sold to former GMS owner Alex Kean and the Easdale family with each owning 50%. Arriva had retained a separate operating licence for McGill's, and this was used as the basis for the sale. The McGill's Bus Services name was revived by the new company and a new livery of blue, white, and gold was introduced. The fleet initially consisted of 33 Mercedes-Benz minibuses hired from Arriva; services were operated from a large depot on the Easdale Industrial Estate.

Early in its existence, the new company began operating services in competition with Harte Buses, mainly between McGill's 507 and Harte Buses 603, with the purpose of serving Midton in Gourock. In September 2004, Harte withdrew from two routes, leaving McGill's as the sole operator in the town.

In October 2004, Kean sold his shares in the company to the Easdale family, who quickly replaced the hired minibuses with new low-floor vehicles, leading to increases in passenger numbers.

=== Consolidation & expansion (2005–2020) ===
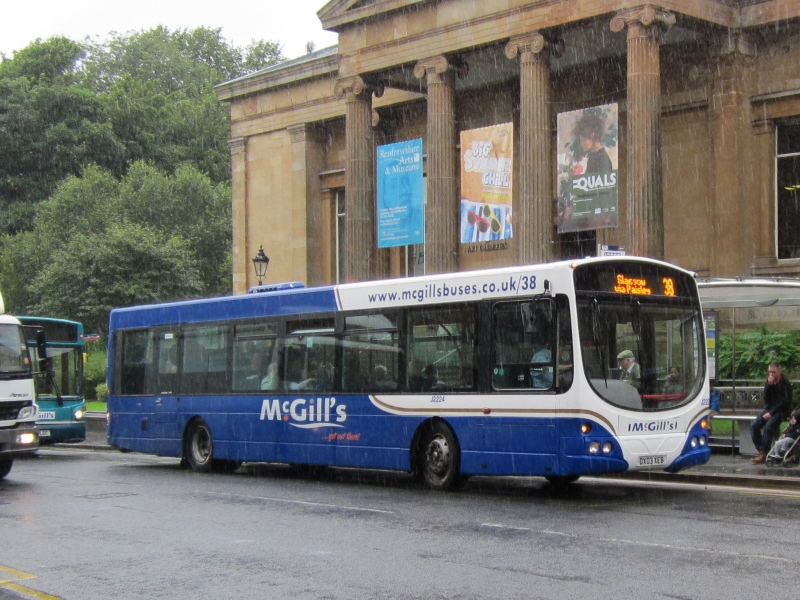
Wright Eclipse Urban bodied Volvo B7RLE painted in traditional McGill's colours in August 2012

Between 2005 and 2008, McGill's introduced a number of new longer-distance routes connecting Inverclyde and Glasgow to Largs, and in May 2005, began operating a series of day excursions branded as Smoothiecruisers. In July 2008, McGill's purchased the stage carriage routes and goodwill of four routes centred on Greenock which had previously been run by Slaemuir Coaches. In the same month, the firm established a second depot in Barrhead on the site of the garage used by the original McGill's Bus Services, which had been vacated by Arriva in 2002.

The new operation traded as United Buses using Greenock and District Omnibuses, with vehicles on hire from ABC Taxis, which also had an o-licence and capitalised on the revocation of the operating licences held by local operator John Walker to move onto four routes previously served by his group of companies.

Twenty step-entrance buses were initially used, but these were largely replaced by low-floor vehicles after four months. The United name was replaced by that of McGill's in September 2009; the same month saw the company introducing the express service X23 between Glasgow and Erskine. By the beginning of 2010, McGill's had become the largest independent bus operator in Scotland, and the fourth largest operator of any type.

A new service linking Greenock and Larkfield was introduced in early 2010 to replace a route withdrawn by Wilson's Coaches. May 2010 saw McGill's expand its services from Dunoon and Greenock to Braehead to cover for the withdrawal of Harte Buses' Braehead Express. In July 2010, the company was fined £60,000 by the Traffic Commissioner for failing to operate some services as timetabled, although it was permitted to expand its fleet from 110 to 150 vehicles. The Smoothiecrusisers network was withdrawn in August 2010.

The company acquired the operations and vehicles of large independent operator Gibson's Direct in September 2010, expanding the size of its fleet by around 70%.

In February 2011, two small operators based in the Paisley area, Fairway Coaches and Travel Direct, were purchased by McGill's, although no vehicles were acquired. Two further acquisitions, of Renfrewshire-based Ferenze Travel and Phoenix Travel, were announced in March 2011. In the same month, Dickson's of Erskine sold its key route 38, a Glasgow to Paisley service operated in competition with both Arriva Scotland West and First Glasgow, to McGill's, who converted the route to low-floor operation and increased its frequency at a cost of £1.5 million.

In March 2012, McGill's purchased the remaining Arriva Scotland West operation. The sale included 165 vehicles, 380 staff, and depots at Inchinnan and Johnstone. The deal expanded the McGill's a fleet to over 350 buses.

On 15 October 2012, it was announced that McGill's acquired the local bus services of Alexandria-based McColls Coaches for £3 million, with 30 buses joining the fleet. In June 2013, four new routes in the Paisley area were introduced by the company to replace those of Riverside Transport.

In January 2014, McGill's was linked with a bid to operate the 360-bus network on the Mediterranean island of Malta following the end of Arriva's operations there. A month later, the company pulled out of the bid citing a lack of transparency on the part of the island's government.

In October 2014 McGill's Coaches bought Henderson Travel after it suddenly ceased business, resulting in the company expanding in North Lanarkshire and becoming the dominant operator in the Monklands area by early 2016. An open-top bus tour of Inverclyde named the 'Local Highlights Tour' was introduced by the company in April 2015, while sometime in 2015, McGill's lost their Dunbartonshire contracts to Garelochhead Coaches.

On 20 January 2016, McGill's announced its first acquisition in the Monklands area of Lanarkshire, when a deal was reached to purchase the bus routes of McNairn Coaches and JJ Travel for an undisclosed sum. The deal included 14 members of staff and a number of vehicles. Further acquisitions were made on 2 February 2015, with the routes of Arthur's Coaches and D.A. Coaches being bought out alongside three vehicles.

On 30 May 2016, McGills purchased the routes and local service vehicles of Silverdale Coaches. On 29 August 2016, the company moved premises from a depot in Blantyre Industrial Estate near Hamilton, South Lanarkshire to a new fully refurbished facility in Coatbridge with all services and buses from the Hamilton depot transferring to the new facility.

=== Major acquisitions and FlixBus partnership (2021–) ===
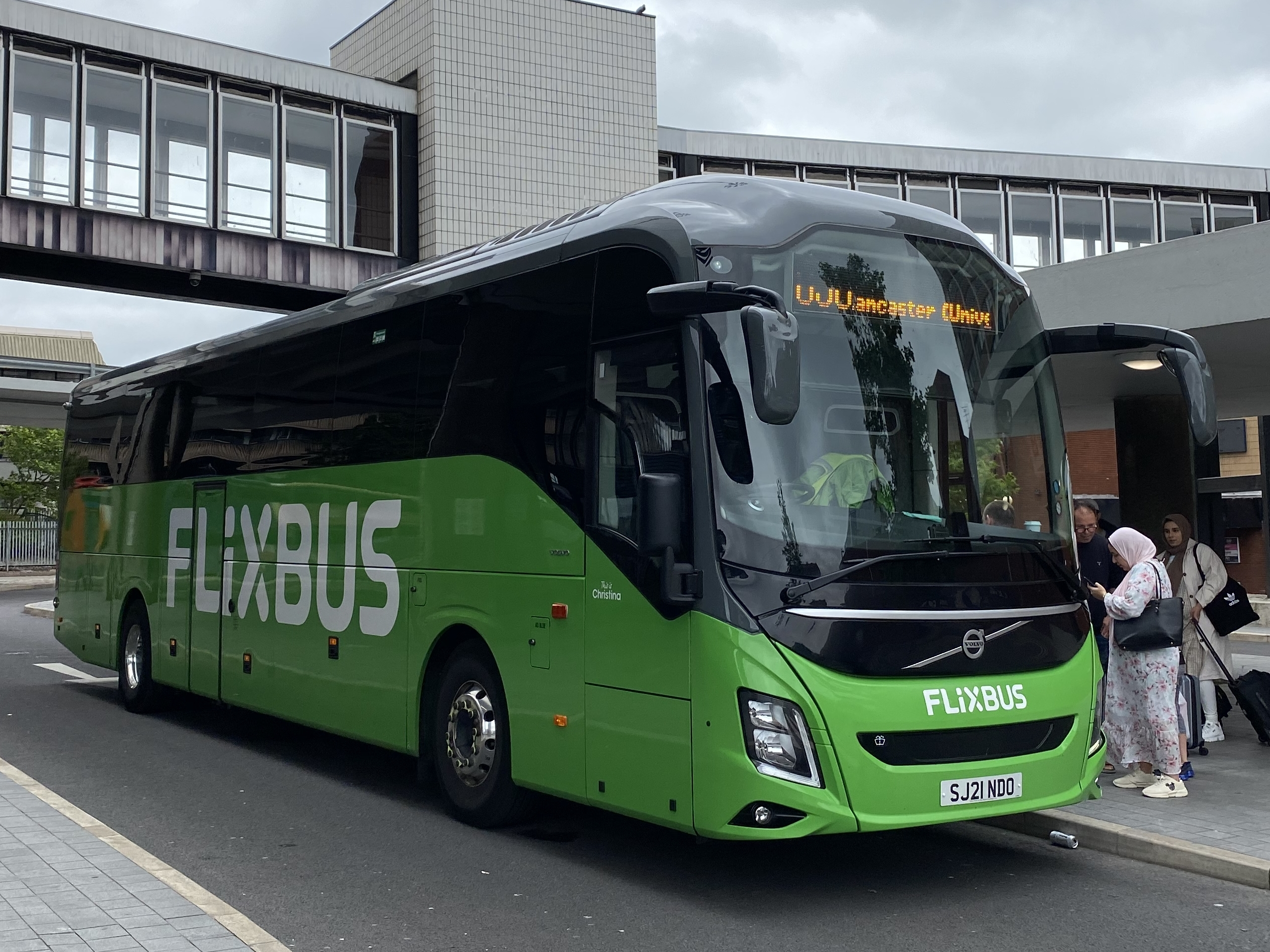
A FlixBus Volvo 9700 operated by McGill's at Preston bus station in July 2022

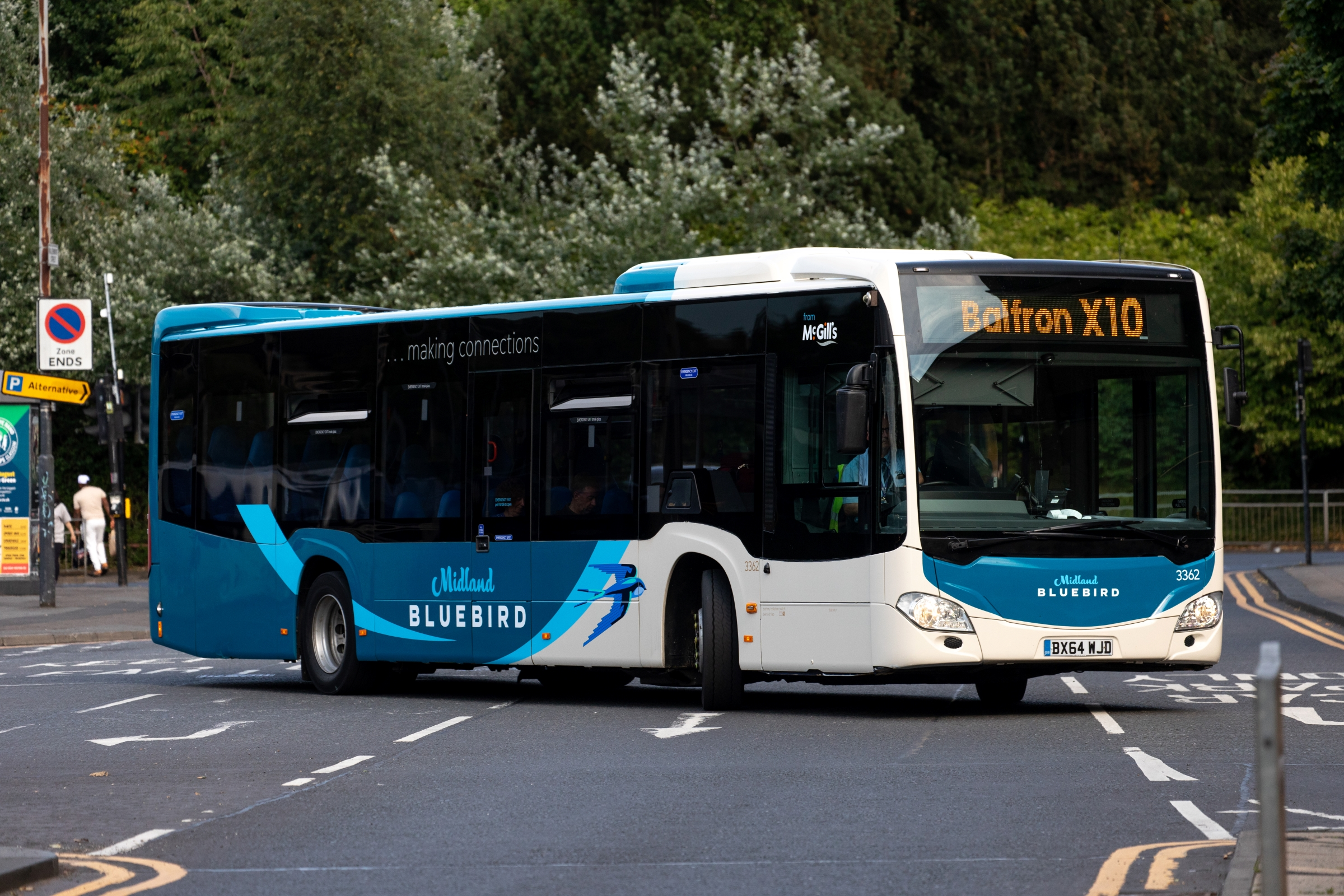
McGill's Midland Bluebird Mercedes-Benz Citaro departing Buchanan bus station in July 2024

On 1 January 2021, McGill's purchased Xplore Dundee and Xplore More from National Express. The business continues to trade under the Xplore Dundee brand for bus travel and Xplore More for coach travel. The sale involved 350 employees and a fleet of 120 buses at the time.

McGill's commenced a partnership with German intercity coach operator FlixBus in July 2021, operating an overnight coach service from Glasgow to London via Edinburgh, Newcastle upon Tyne and Sunderland using a fleet of Volvo 9700 coaches. The network was expanded in 2022 with the addition of a service from Glasgow to Manchester and an internal service between Glasgow and Aberdeen, the latter becoming subject to a legal dispute in April 2023 between FlixBus and the Stagecoach Group, with Flixbus submitting a complaint to the Competition and Markets Authority accusing Stagecoach of a conflict of interest after their slot at Aberdeen's bus station was withdrawn. McGill's began to take delivery of the first of 18 more Volvo 9700 coaches in April 2023, which upon the completion of the order, would bring McGill's FlixBus fleet to a total 25 coaches. This order is planned to coincide with the introduction of new coach services operated by McGill's across Scotland, as well as some frequency increases on pre-existing services.

On 6 September 2022, it was announced that McGill's had acquired the operations of First Scotland East from the FirstGroup. The company was rebranded to McGill's Scotland East, also trading as McGill's Midland Bluebird and McGill's Eastern Scottish. The sale, completed on 19 September 2022, saw McGill's take on 550 employees, four depots and a fleet of 257 buses from the FirstGroup, including the Bright Bus Tours open top bus tour operation in Edinburgh. The Eastern Scottish operation, operating services in Edinburgh and West Lothian, was gradually closed between October and December due to issues with driver recruitment and low passenger patronage, as well as traffic congestion and competition with the railways and Lothian Buses rendering the operation unsustainable to operate.

In October 2024, it was announced that McGill's would begin local operations in Aberdeen from 25 November through taking over service X14, running between Aberdeen city centre and Kingswells, from existing operator Stagecoach Bluebird with the support of Aberdeen City Council. From April 2025, McGill's began operating an open top bus tour around Aberdeen, named the "Aberdeen Adventurer". The route starts and ends on Broad Street and takes passengers around many popular landmarks in a loop around the city.

McGill's announced plans in September 2025 for a new £25 million central Glasgow bus depot located on Kilbirnie Street in Tradeston, with electric charging infrastructure planned from the offset and the potential for up to 850 jobs to be created when the garage opens by the end of 2026.

== Ownership and management ==
McGill's Bus Services was initially owned by Alex Kean, a former taxi and local bus operator, and the Easdale family, who also ran a number of taxi firms in the Inverclyde region, as well as several non-transport businesses. Both parties owned 50% of shares in the company until October 2004, when Kean sold his 50% share to the Easdale family.

Former Arriva Scotland West managing director Ralph Roberts joined McGill's in March 2010, later becoming the company's chief executive. General manager Bert Hendry and finance director Graeme Davidson retained their positions, while James Easdale became the firm's chairman. Colin Napier, who had previously worked for Coakley Bus & Coach and McKindless, became the company's area manager for its eastern operations in August 2010.

Napier has since been appointed to head of operations & commercial, and in July 2024, Robbie Drummond was named finance director and company secretary. Ralph Roberts replaced James Easdale as chairman of McGill's, with former Ascendal Group CEO Tony Williamson succeeding Roberts as the McGill's CEO.

Former Transdev Blazefield CEO Alex Hornby was appointed as the McGill's Group's managing director in May 2023. Hornby left his post with immediate effect on 25 July 2024.

== Fleet ==
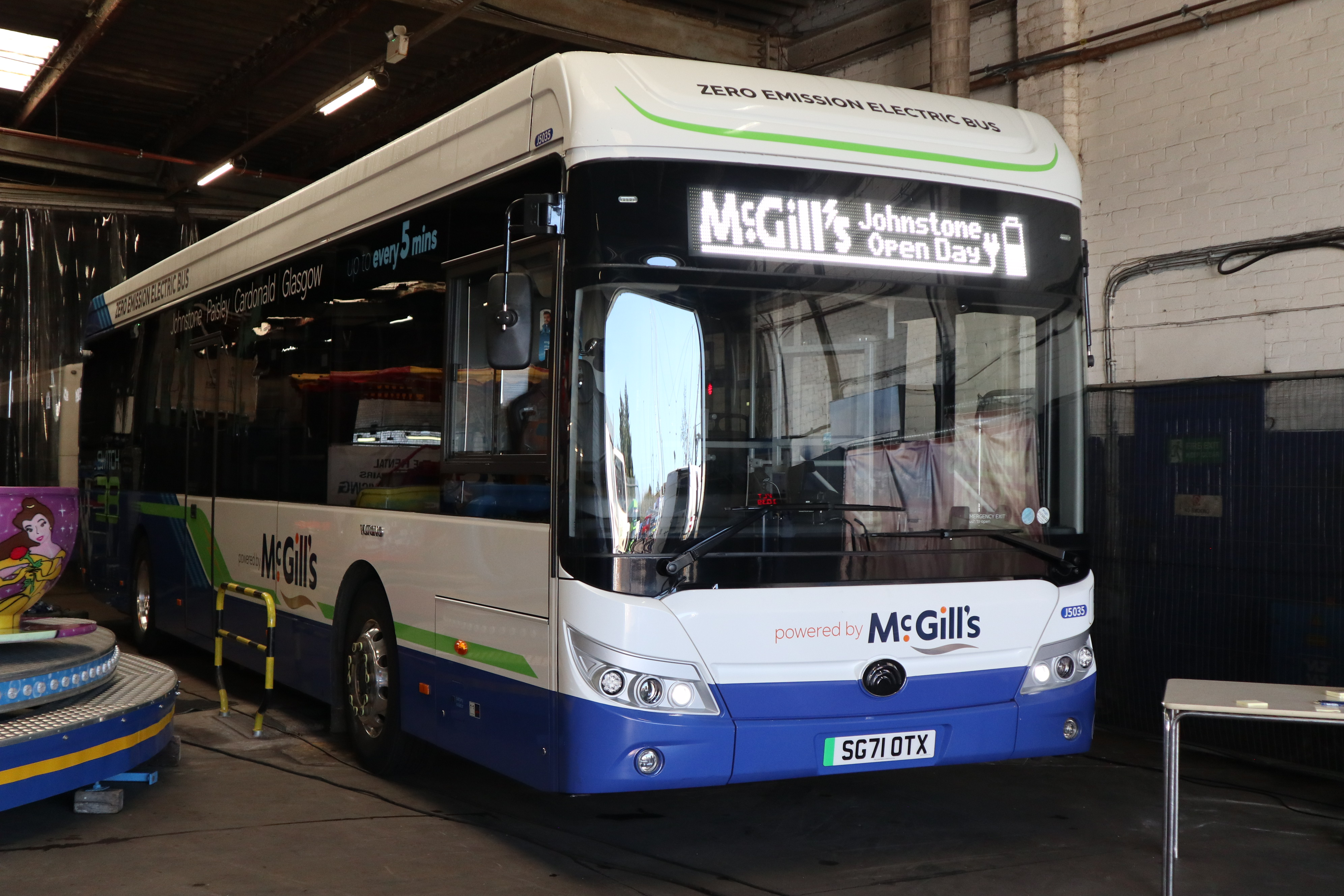
A Yutong E12 battery electric bus at the company's Johnstone depot in September 2022

As of January 2021 the McGill's fleet consists of 441 buses and coaches.

The company is the largest operator of Yutong E10 and E12 battery electric buses in the United Kingdom as of 2023, operating a total 96 of the type in and around Glasgow, Renfrewshire and Inverclyde. McGill's first took delivery of 55 E12s in November 2021, which were later joined by 31 E12s and ten E10s in March 2023.
