= Alexander Strider =

Step-entrance full-size single-deck bus body

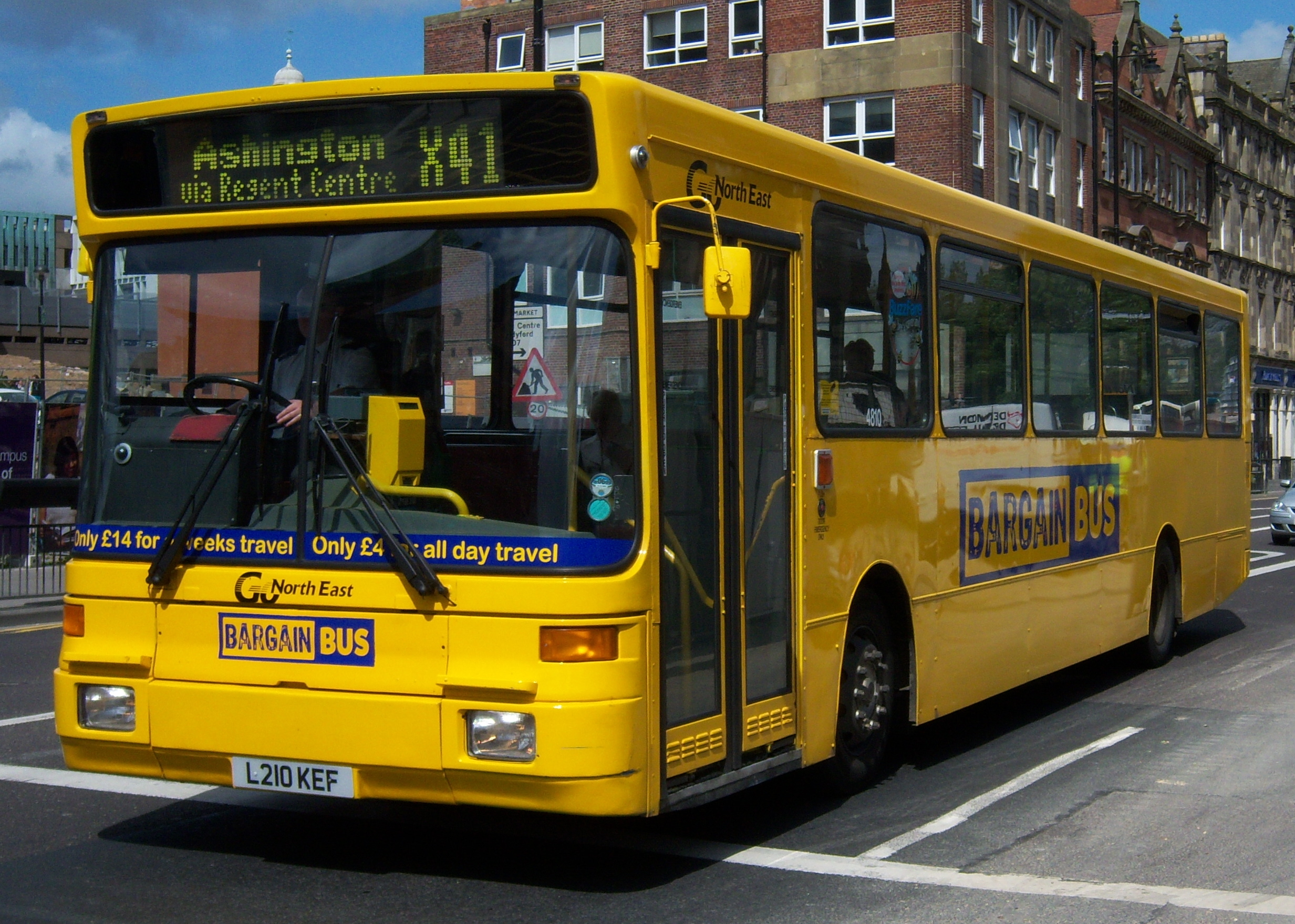
- Go North East Alexander Strider bodied Volvo B10B in Newcastle upon Tyne in May 2009

Overview
- Manufacturer: Alexander
- Production: 1993–1997
- Assembly: Falkirk, Scotland

Body and chassis
- Doors: 1 or 2
- Floor type: Step entrance
- Chassis: Dennis Lance; Volvo B10B; Volvo B10M; Scania L113; Scania N113
- Related: Alexander PS type

Dimensions
- Length: 12.0 metres (39.4 ft)
- Width: 2.5 metres (8 ft 2 in)
- Height: 3.0 metres (9.8 ft)

Chronology
- Successor: Alexander ALX300

The Alexander Strider was a single-decker bus body produced by Walter Alexander Coachbuilders between 1993 and 1997. The body was available on Dennis Lance, Scania L113, Scania N113, Volvo B10B and Volvo B10M chassis. A common feature of the Strider body is that it has either a single-curvature windscreen or a double-curvature windscreen with a rounded roof dome and a separately mounted destination display.

== Operators ==
Yorkshire Rider were the largest customer overall for the Alexander Strider, taking delivery of 55 on Scania N113 chassis and 30 on Volvo B10B chassis between 1993 and 1994. 20 of the Scania N113s, delivered in 1994, were equipped with guide wheels and branded in a silver, blue and red livery for Rider's 'Superbus' Leeds guided busway service. Sister company Rider York also took delivery of five Strider-bodied Scania L113s following the chassis' launch in August 1994.

The Caldaire Group were another popular customer for the Strider on the Volvo B10B chassis. The group took delivery of a total 29 Strider bodied B10Bs for its Selby & District West Riding and Yorkshire Woollen companies between 1993 and 1994. Caldaire were also the only customers for the Strider on the Dennis Lance chassis, taking delivery of 18 for Yorkshire Woollen and 12 for West Riding in 1993.

Blazefield Holdings' Harrogate & District operation took delivery of five Strider bodied Volvo B10Bs for use on route 36 in 1995, followed by Keighley & District taking delivery of ten examples in 1996 on route-branded 'Star Buses' services. Welsh municipal bus operator Newport Transport also purchased Striders on the Scania N113 chassis, taking a total of 30 between 1993 and 1997, while fellow municipal Cardiff Bus also purchased seven on the same chassis.

Other smaller operators of the Alexander Strider included West Midlands Travel, who took six on the Volvo B10B chassis in 1994; Solent Blue Line, who took delivery of three B10Bs in 1994, and after Liverbus had made an order for twelve Strider bodied Volvo B10Bs in 1992, MTL subsidiary MerseyRider took delivery of only three Striders in 1994.

== Gallery ==
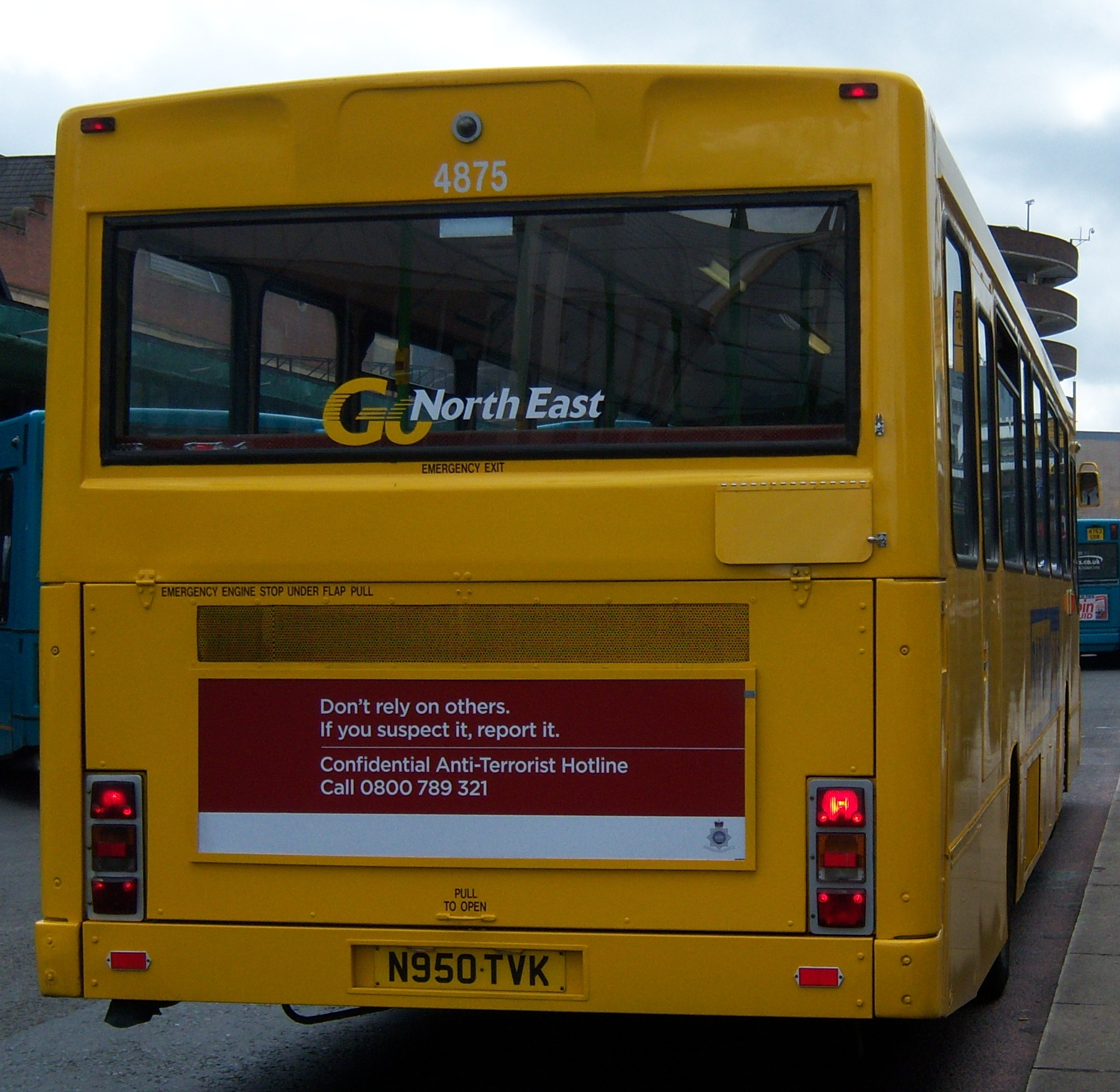
Go North East Alexander Strider bodied Volvo B10B rear in Newcastle upon Tyne in May 2009

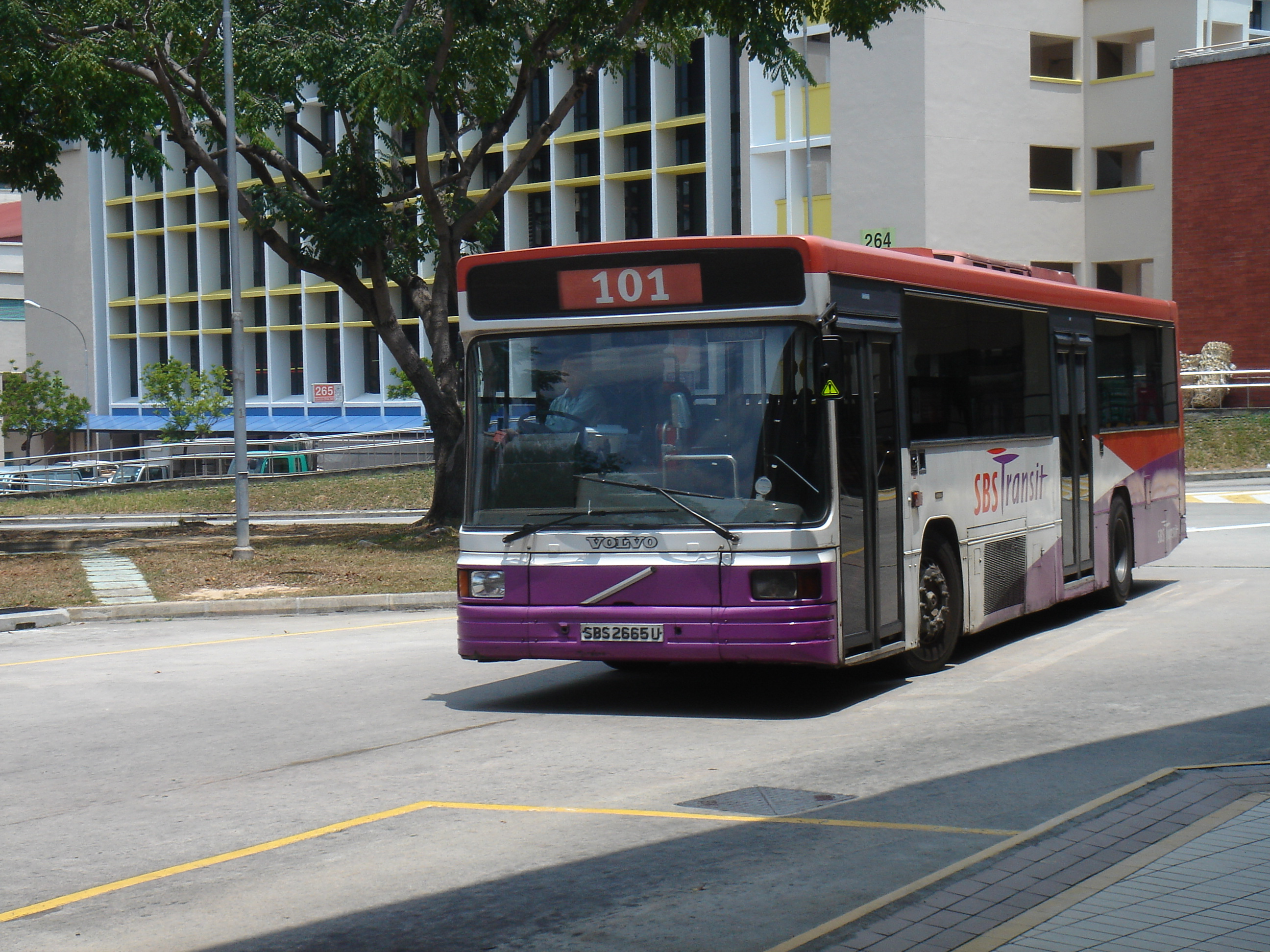
A Singapore Bus Services Alexander Strider bodied Volvo B10M in Singapore in March 2006
