= Alexander ALX100 =

Step-entrance minibus body on Mercedes-Benz van chassis

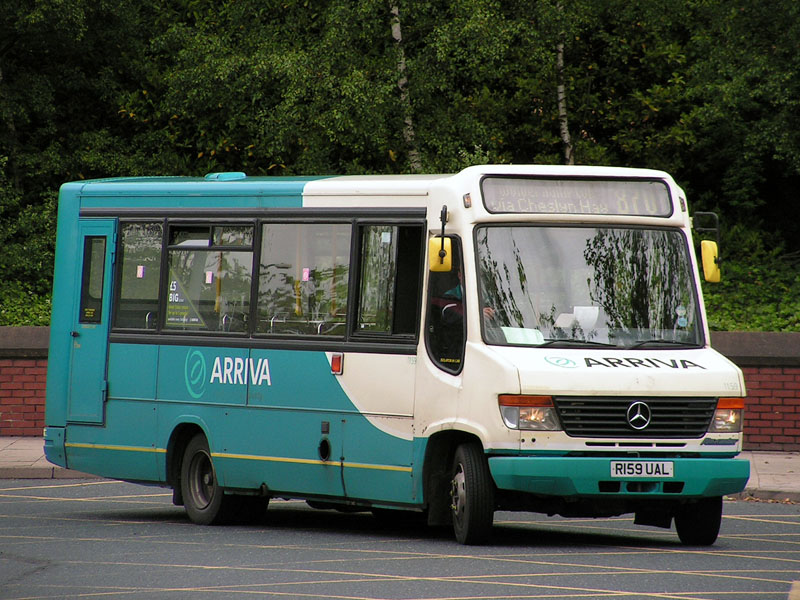
- Arriva Midlands North Alexander ALX100 bodied Mercedes-Benz Vario at Wolverhampton bus station in June 2005

Overview
- Manufacturer: Walter Alexander Coachbuilders
- Production: 1997–1999
- Assembly: Falkirk, Scotland

Body and chassis
- Doors: 1 door
- Floor type: Step entrance
- Chassis: Mercedes-Benz Vario
- Related: ALX200, ALX300, ALX400, ALX500

Powertrain
- Engine: Mercedes-Benz OM904LA
- Transmission: Mercedes-Benz manual Allison AT542 automatic

Dimensions
- Length: 7.0–7.9 m (23 ft 0 in – 25 ft 11 in)
- Width: 2.5 m (8 ft 2 in)
- Height: 3.0 m (9 ft 10 in)

Chronology
- Successor: Plaxton Beaver (spiritual only, after the Transbus takeover)

The Alexander ALX100 is a minibus body that was built by Walter Alexander Coachbuilders between 1997 and 1999. The second vehicle to be launched in the 'ALX' range, over 150 ALX100 bodies were built, exclusively on the Mercedes-Benz O814D Vario and O810D van chassis cowls.

== Design ==
The ALX100 was launched in 1997 as a replacement for the AM-Type 'Sprint' body, fitted to the previous Mercedes 709D chassis. With the retention of the Mercedes front chassis cowl, including the grille, bonnet and headlights, the aluminium framed ALX100 was extremely visually similar to the competing Plaxton Beaver 2, which was also bodied on the Vario. The ALX100 mainly differed with a rear-end design developed from Alexander's ALX200 low-floor midibus, incorporating circular rear lights recessed into the bodywork to reduce the risk of breakage and a curved rear window that contrasted with square-cornered gasket side windows.

As a result of the new Vario suspension featuring a lower frame height and air suspension, the ALX100 had a low 250 millimetres (9.8 in) entrance step, which led to two further 200 mm (7.9 in) steps up to the passenger compartment. Between 25 and 31 passengers could be seated on the ALX100 depending on configuration, with up to 10 standing passengers additionally able to be carried.

During 1998, the ALX100 received a styling update, featuring deeper side windows with plastic trim applied below the windows. The ALX100 could also be specified with different door styles as well as to two different lengths depending on the wheelbase model, similar to the Beaver 2.

== Operators ==
Cowie Group subsidiaries Midland Red North and Stevensons of Uttoxeter were the launch customers for the ALX100, taking delivery of eleven in June 1997 for use in on local services in Lichfield and Crewe. Further operators who bought the ALX100 in large numbers included Stagecoach Holdings subsidiaries Stagecoach Oxford, Stagecoach Cumberland and Stagecoach Devon, as well as Arriva Northumbria, Arriva Fox County and its predecessor Midland Fox, and Travel West Midlands.

== See also ==
- List of buses
