= Alexander Dash =

Step-entrance midibus body on Dennis Dart and Volvo B6 chassis

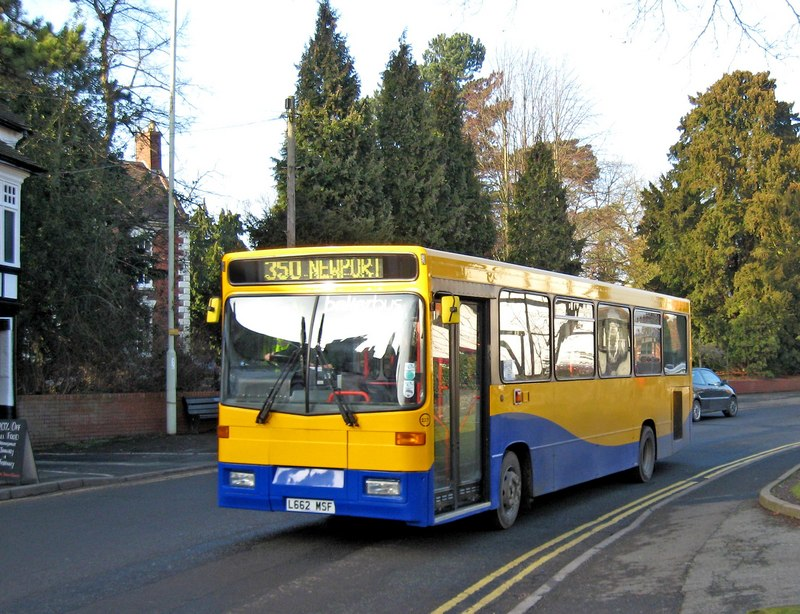
- Pre-facelift Bakerbus Alexander Dash-bodied Volvo B6

Overview
- Manufacturer: Walter Alexander Coachbuilders
- Production: 1991–1997
- Assembly: Falkirk, Scotland

Body and chassis
- Doors: 1 door
- Floor type: Step entrance
- Chassis: Dennis Dart; Volvo B6
- Related: Alexander PS type

Powertrain
- Engine: (Dart) Cummins 6BT (B6) Volvo TD63E/TD63ES
- Capacity: 34 to 41 seated
- Power output: 93kW 135hp (Dart)
- Transmission: (Dart) Allison AT545 4-speed (B6) ZF 4HP500

Dimensions
- Length: 9.0–9.9 m (29.5–32.5 ft)
- Width: 2.3 m (7 ft 7 in)
- Height: 3.4 m (11 ft)

Chronology
- Successor: Alexander ALX200

The Alexander Dash is a step-entrance midibus body built by Walter Alexander Coachbuilders of Scotland from 1991 to 1997. Unveiled by Alexander at the 1991 Coach and Bus exhibition in Birmingham, it was one of the variants of Alexander's AM-type body, also using components from the Alexander PS type, and was usually combined with the Dennis Dart and Volvo B6 step-entrance single-decker bus chassis.

The body was mainly built for the United Kingdom bus market, with Alexander primarily marketing the Dash towards smaller independent bus operators, although one example with a Volvo B6R chassis and air-conditioning was shipped to Hong Kong in January 1995 for use by Citybus as a demonstrator; this was later returned to the United Kingdom, where it entered service with Stagecoach Devon. Early Dashes were delivered with V-shaped windscreens, single headlights and a square vented grille.

In 1995, the Alexander Dash received a frontal facelift. The facelift, aimed at improving accessibility, also featured a longer front grille with badging in the shape of a saltire, twin headlights and foglamps beside the grille, and a horizontal windscreen with an option for a heated windscreen. Yorkshire Rider, under the ownership of the Badgerline Group, took delivery of the first 50 facelifted Dashes on Dennis Dart chassis in early 1995. Other deliveries of the facelifted Dash-bodied Dart to Badgerline's successor FirstBus included six Darts for First Grampian in early 1996, and six Darts for First Greater Manchester.

The only London bus operators to take delivery of the Dash were Capital Citybus and Stagecoach Holdings' London subsidiaries, the latter being bodied on the Dennis Dart chassis. The first 27 pre-facelift Dashes were delivered to East London for services in Barking and Romford in November 1995, with another 39 post-facelift examples being delivered to Selkent for services in Bromley, Catford and Plumstead throughout 1996. These had a short service life, being withdrawn between 1998 and 1999 and disposed to other Stagecoach operations.

The Dash was superseded by the low floor Alexander ALX200 in 1996–1997 with a more rounded roof dome and plastic mouldings under the windscreen to make it deeper having made on the Dennis Dart SLF and the Volvo B6LE chassis.

== Gallery ==
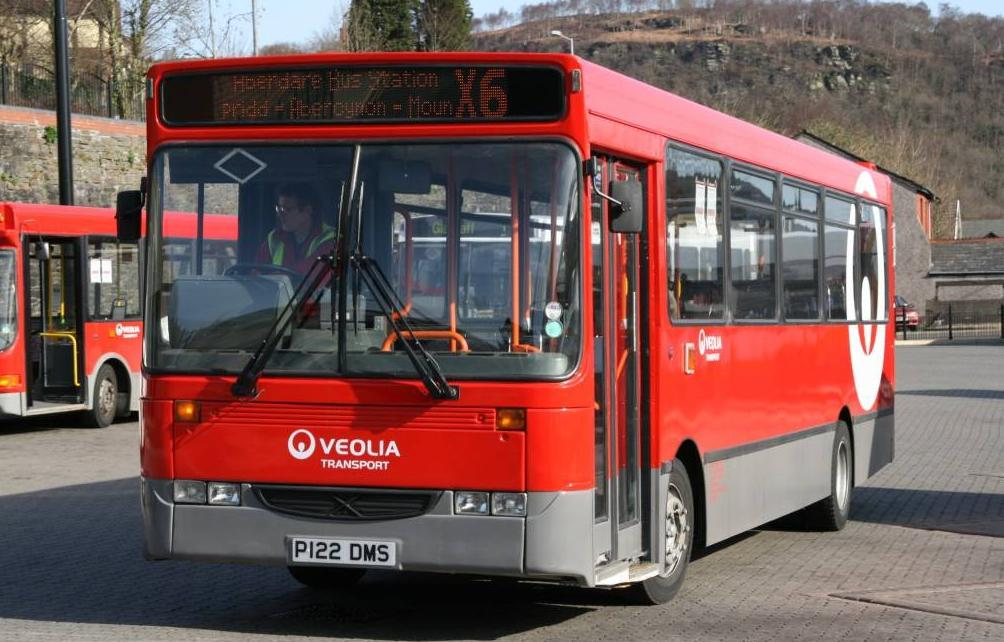
Facelifted Alexander Dash bodied Dennis Dart with Veolia Transport in 2007

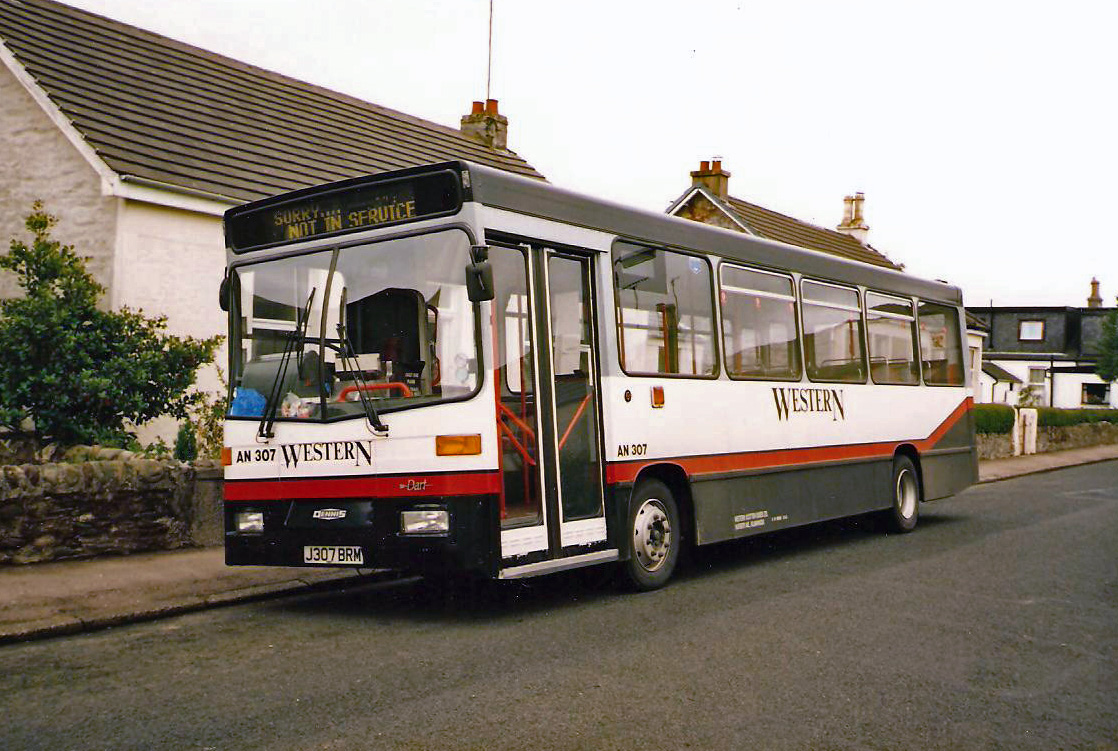
Pre-facelift Western Scottish Alexander Dash bodied Dennis Dart with a V-shaped windscreen in 1993

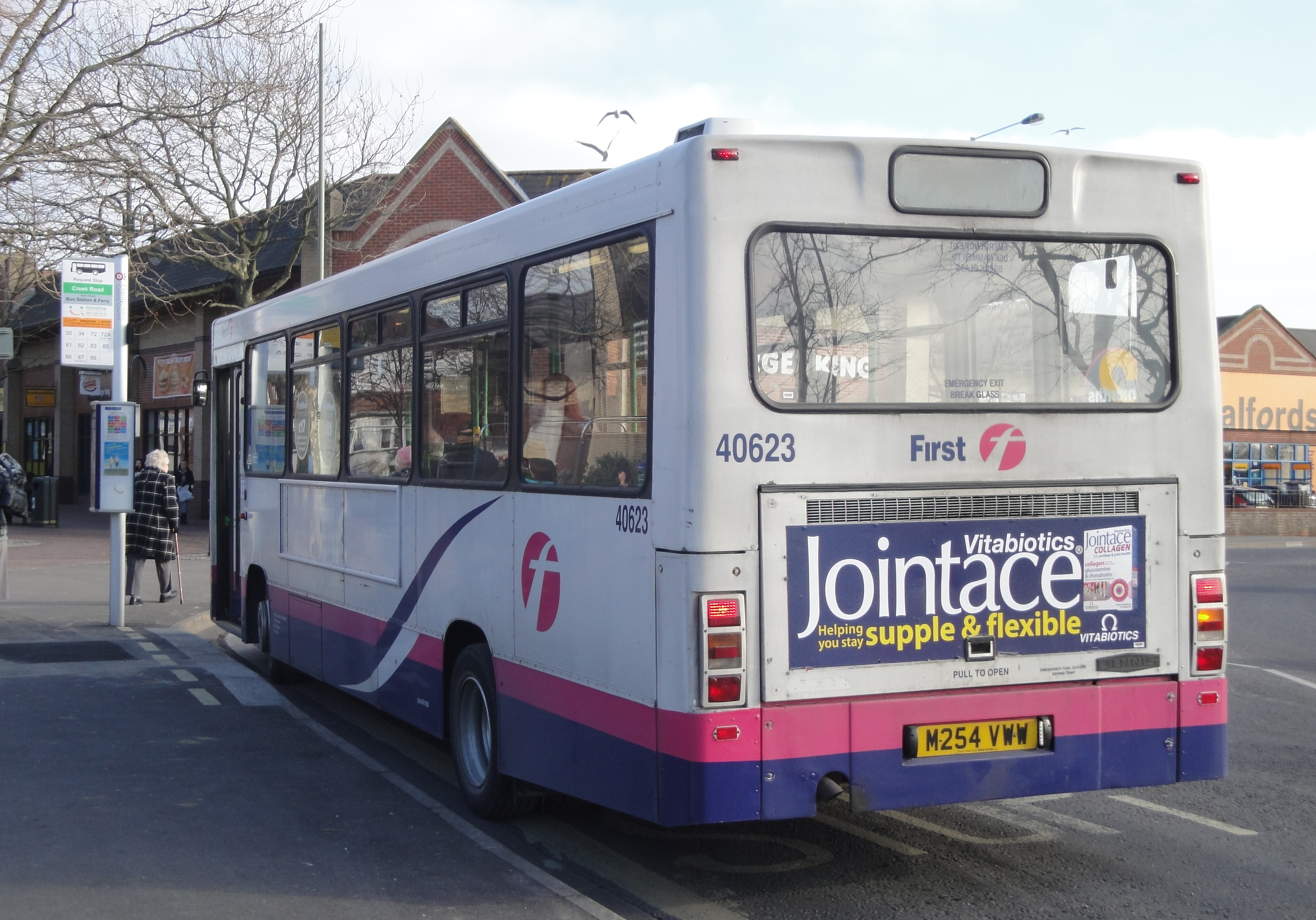
Rear of a First Hampshire & Dorset Alexander Dash bodied Dennis Dart

== See also ==
- Alexander PS type, the Dash's full-size equivalent
- List of buses
