= Walter Alexander Coachbuilders =

Scottish company

Walter Alexander
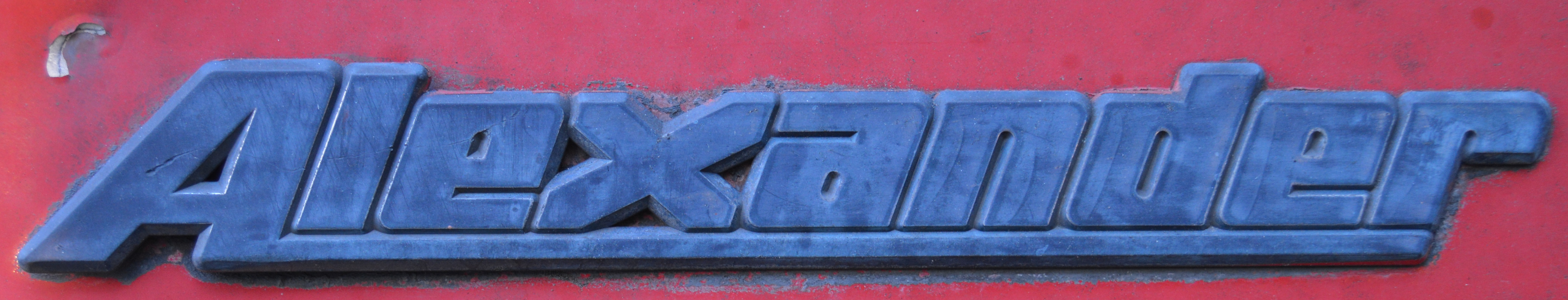
- Founded: 1913
- Founder: Walter Alexander
- Defunct: 31 December 2000
- Fate: Merged into TransBus International (now Alexander Dennis)
- Successor: TransBus International
- Headquarters: Falkirk, formerly Stirling
- Products: Bus and coach bodywork

Walter Alexander Coachbuilders was a Scottish builder of bus and coach bodywork based in Falkirk. The company was formed in 1947 to continue the coachbuilding activities of W. Alexander & Sons when their bus service operation was nationalised. After several mergers and changes of ownership it now forms part of Alexander Dennis.

== History ==
In 1913, Walter Alexander founded Alexander's Motor Service to expand upon the Falkirk & District Tramways Company's route into previously unserved Grangemouth.

In 1924, believing in the future of the omnibus, Alexander established W. Alexander & Sons Limited, to run them and to manufacture bodywork for its own fleet and for sale to other operators. In 1928, several of the major British railway companies bought into the Scottish Motor Traction Company (SMT). Walter Alexander decided to sell his business to the SMT group in 1929, and through this action, received access to a vast supply of resources and services. Alexander became an in-house supplier of bodywork for the whole of the SMT group, and only a few bodies were built for other customers during this period.

Coachbuilding work had initially taken place at the company's main bus garage and works in Brown Street, Camelon, but it outgrew this facility and in 1930 a bus garage in Drip Road, Stirling was converted into a dedicated coachbuilding factory, although a few bodies for Alexander's own fleet did continue to be built at Brown Street in the 1930s and '40s.

In 1947, in anticipation of the newly elected Labour Government's nationalisation of the SMT group's bus services, a new company, Walter Alexander & Company (Coachbuilders) Limited was formed to keep the coachbuilding business in private hands. Although Alexander remained the largest supplier of bodywork to what became the Scottish Bus Group, the independent company also began to broaden its customer base. The company outgrew the Drip Road premises and in 1958 it relocated to a purpose-built factory at Glasgow Road, Camelon.

The coachbuilding business continued to flourish and expansion was rapid. In 1969, the company bought out Potters, a bodybuilder in Northern Ireland, and set up a subsidiary company, Walter Alexander (Belfast), and within six years started selling buses to the Far East. In 1981 the company was awarded the Queen's Award for Export. By 1983, the company was the largest supplier of double-deck bus bodies in the world, and a year later it won a British Rail contract to construct 25 Class 143 carriages. In 1987, Walter Alexander became a publicly listed company, having previously been a private firm run by the Alexander family.

The ownership of the company subsequently changed several times: In 1990 the family sold the company to Spotlaunch plc, but within two years, a management buyout occurred and it became a standalone company until 1995, when it was bought by the Mayflower Corporation plc. In 2001, it was incorporated into TransBus International. It is now part of Alexander Dennis.

== Products ==
Walter Alexander built many different types of bodywork over 50 years, with the most famous being the Y-Type single decker.

=== Railcars ===
- British Rail Class 143 – on underframes by Andrew Barclay
- British Rail Class 144 – on underframes by British Rail Engineering Limited
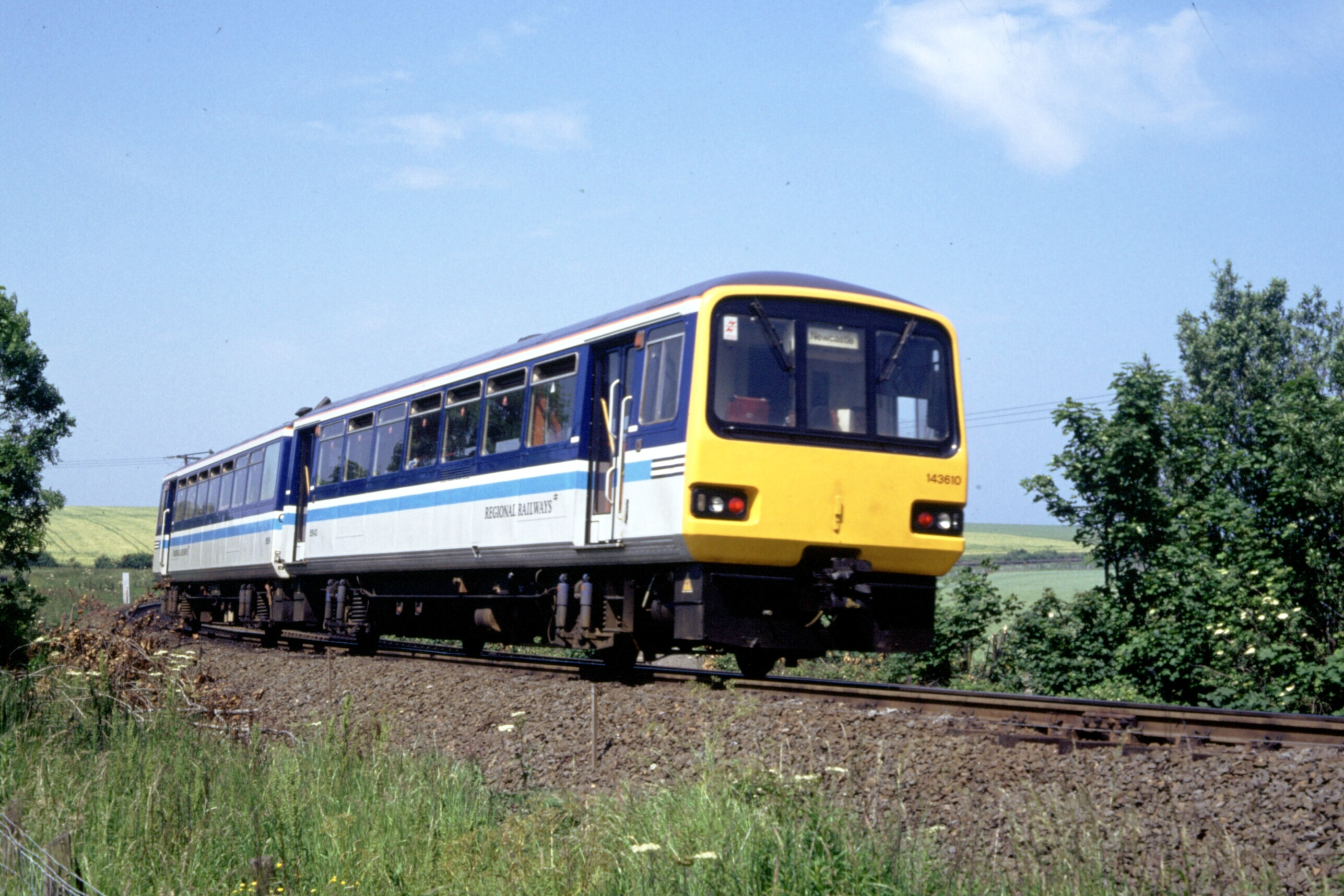
Regional Railways Class 143

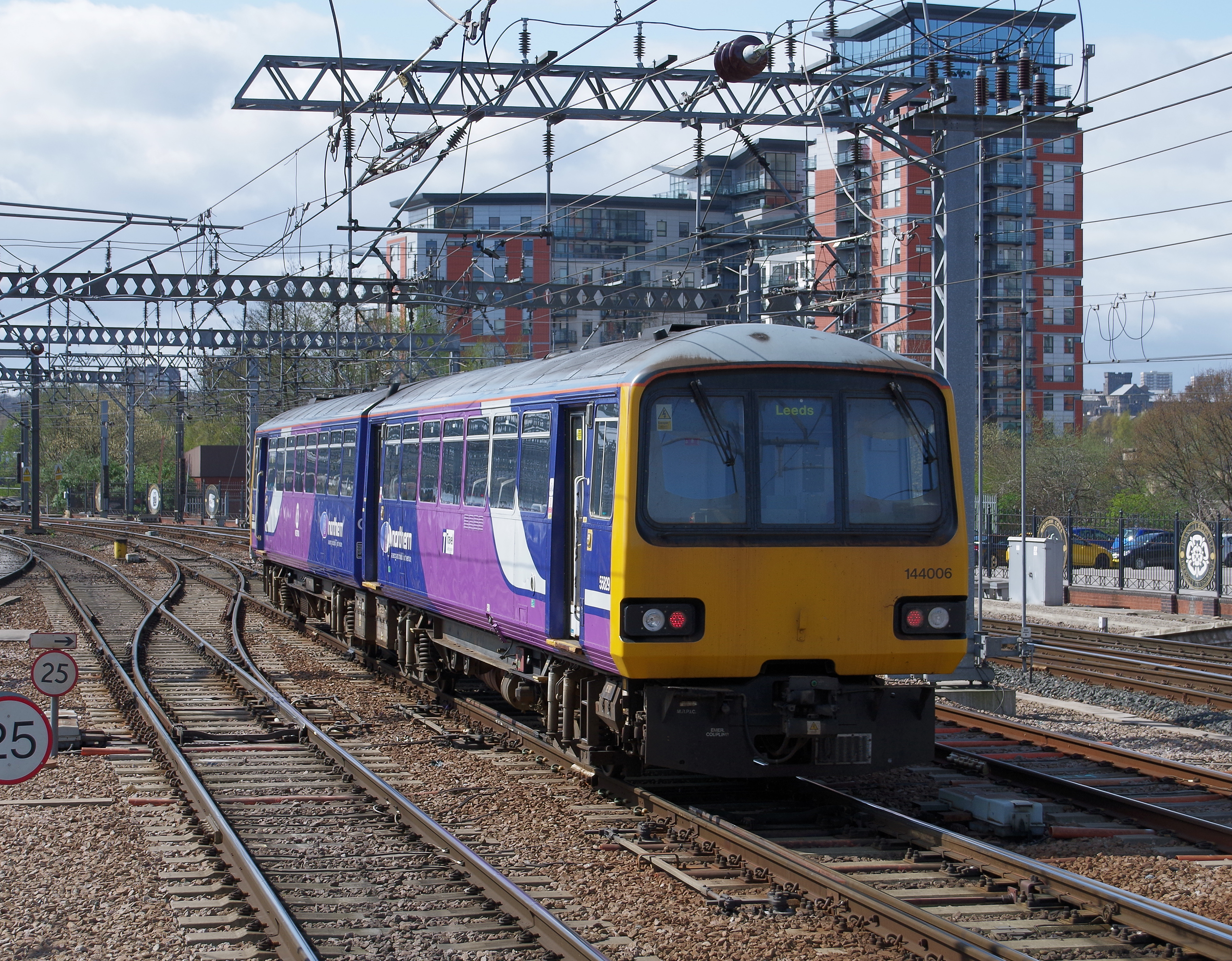
Northern Rail Class 144

=== Double-deck buses ===
- A type and J type – double-deck body (for Leyland Atlantean/Daimler Fleetline) to 1972
- C type -lowheight double-deck body for Albion Lowlander 1961–65.
- D type, K type and AD type (A for alloy) – lowheight double-deck body (mainly on Fleetline chassis)
- L type and AL type – double-deck body (for Atlantean/Fleetline/Bristol VR) from 1972
- AV type – double-deck body for Volvo Ailsa B55
- R type – including RH, RL, RV, RX, RLC, RVC, RHS and Royale – post 1981 double deck body
- ALX series – including ALX400 & ALX500 – low-floor bodies
- CB type – for China Motor Bus
- KB type – for Kowloon Motor Bus
- LB type – for New Lantao Bus
- MB type – for Manila Bus
- SB type – for Singapore Bus Service
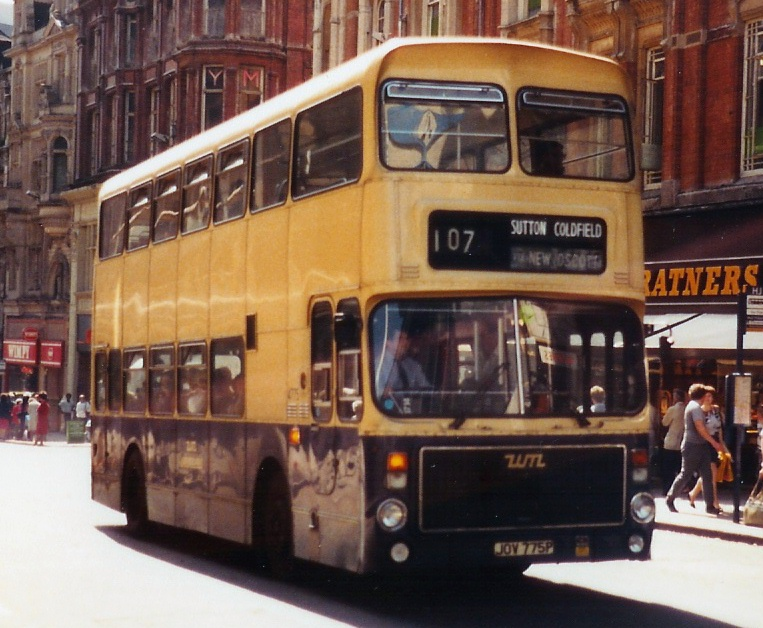
West Midlands PTE AV type bodied Volvo Ailsa B55, pictured in Birmingham in 1982

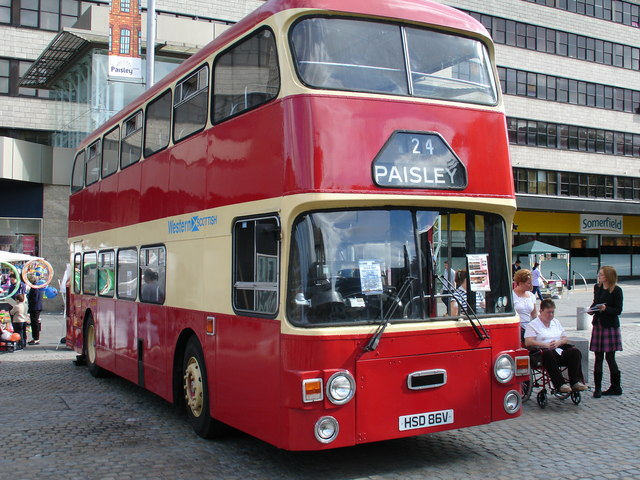
Preserved Western Scottish AD type bodied Daimler Fleetline

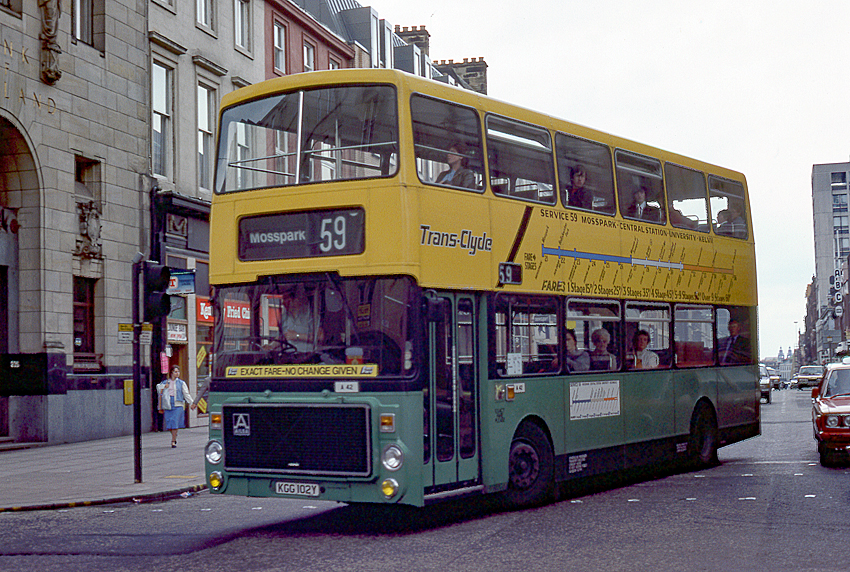
Strathclyde PTE RV type bodied Volvo Ailsa, pictured in Glasgow in 1984

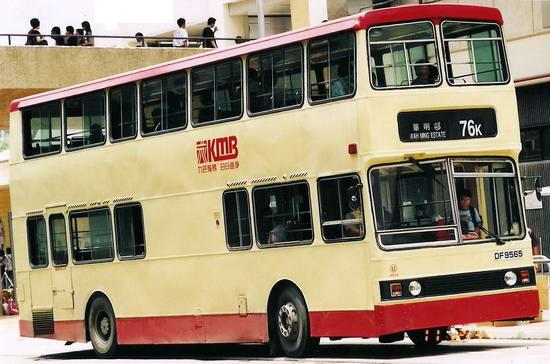
Kowloon Motor Bus RH type bodied Mercedes-Benz O305

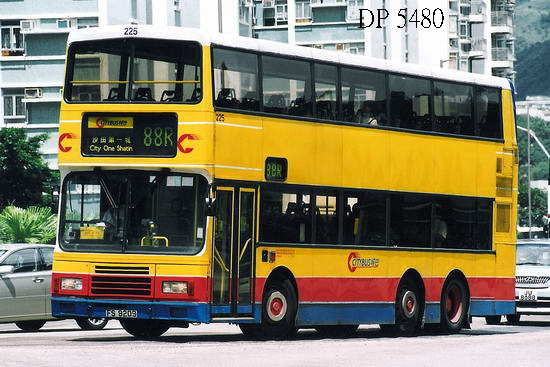
Citybus RH type bodied Leyland Olympian

=== Single-deck buses and coaches ===
- Y type – including AY and AYS types (A for alloy, S for bus specification)
- W type
- M type – Motorway coach for Scottish Bus Group Anglo-Scottish services
- T type – including AT, TS, TC, TE (A for alloy, S for stage, C for coach, E for express)
- P type
- PS type – development of P type, popular with Stagecoach and SBS Transit
- Strider – for full-size rear-engined chassis
- AM type
  - Sprint – minibus body
  - Dash – midibus body (for Dennis Dart/Volvo B6)
- ALX series
  - ALX100 – minibus
  - ALX200 – small low-floor single-deck
  - ALX300 – full-size low-floor single-deck
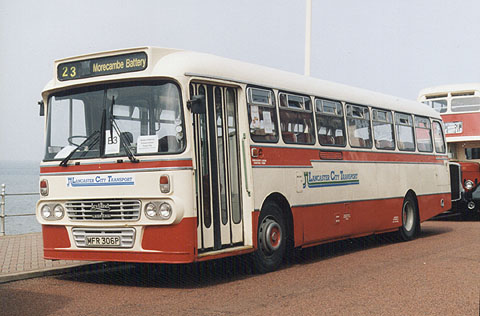
Preserved Y type (AYS) bodied Leyland Leopard on display in Blackpool in 2001

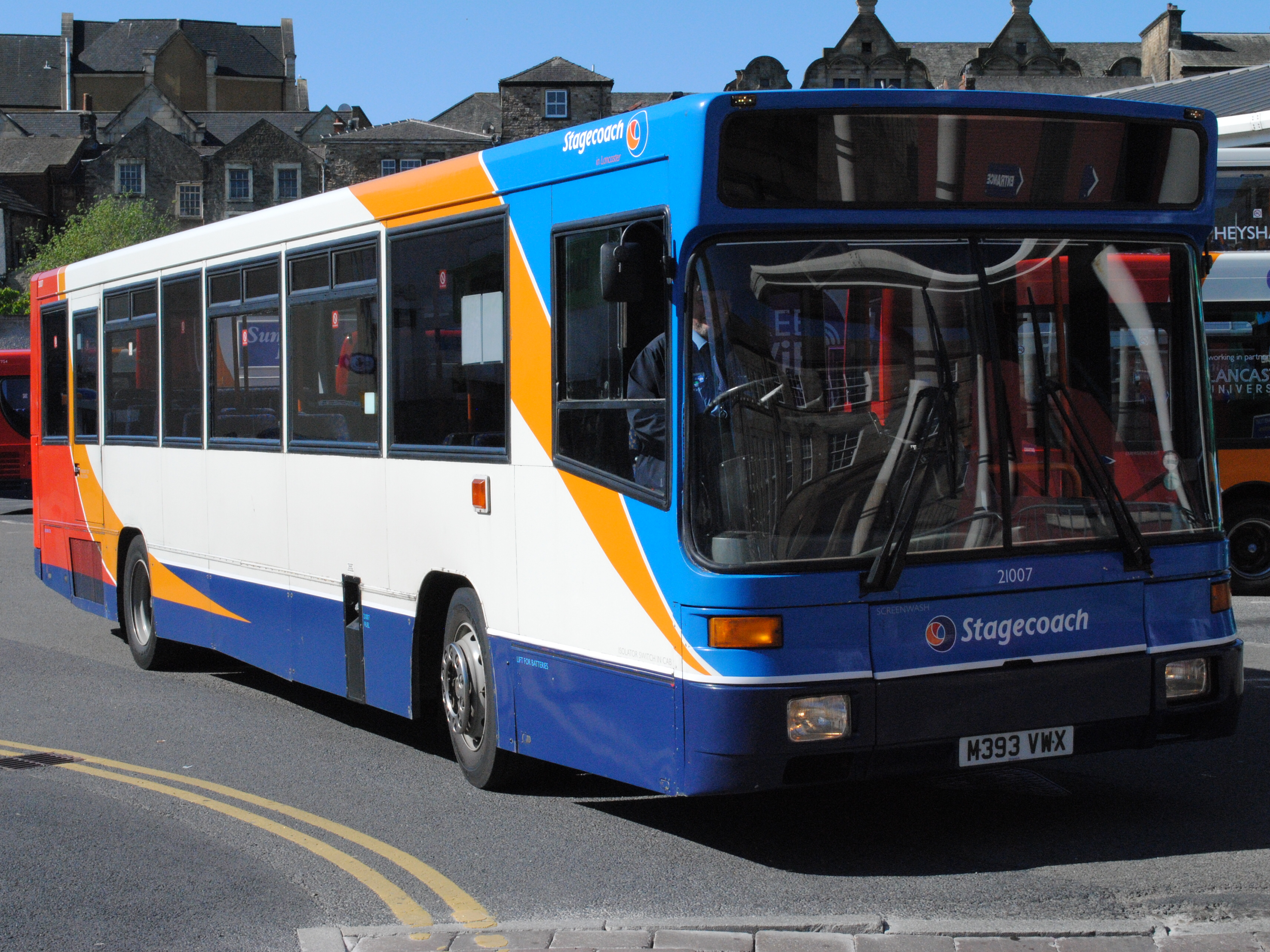
Stagecoach Cumbria & North Lancashire Strider bodied Volvo B10B

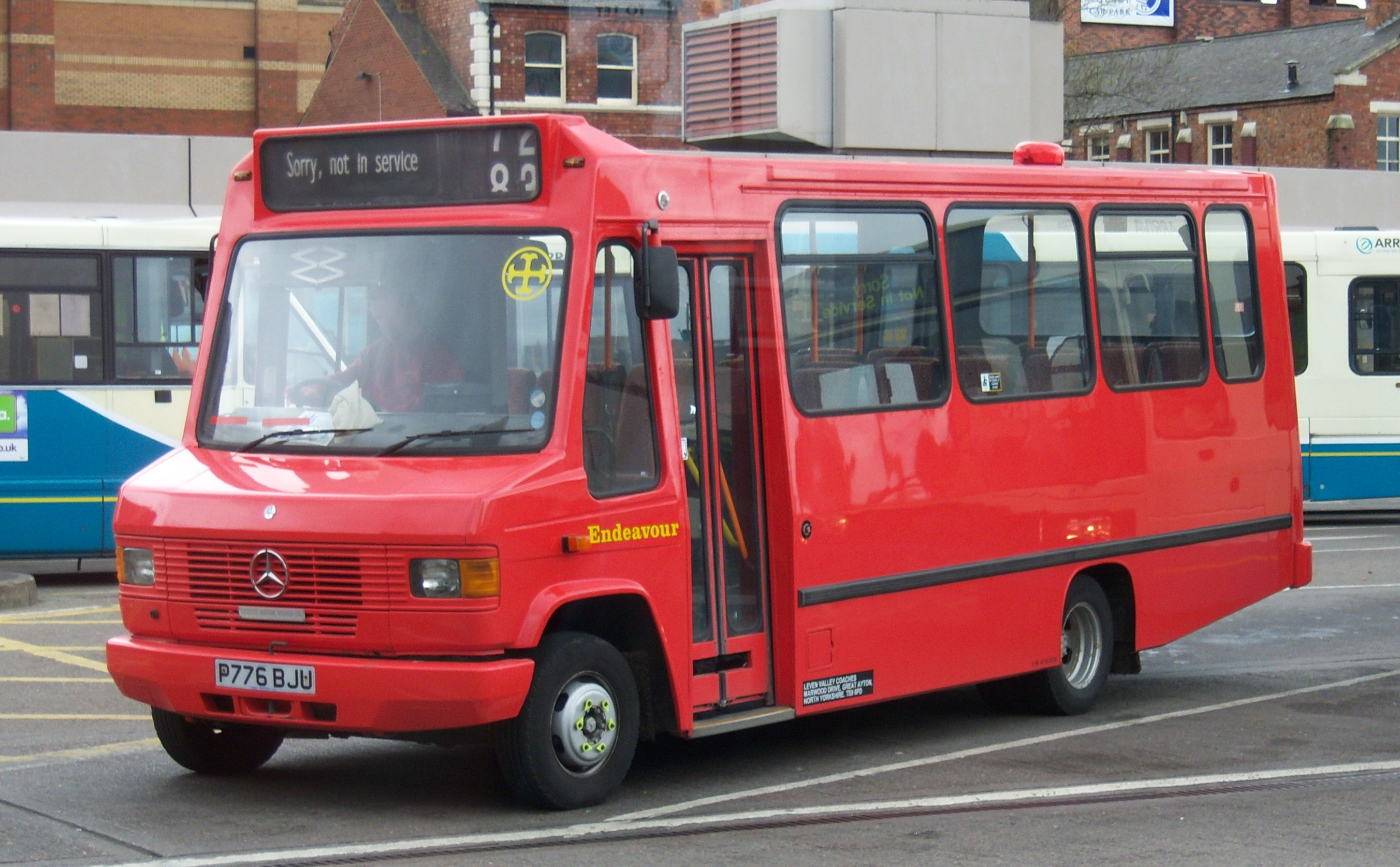
Leven Valley Coaches Sprint bodied Mercedes-Benz 709D

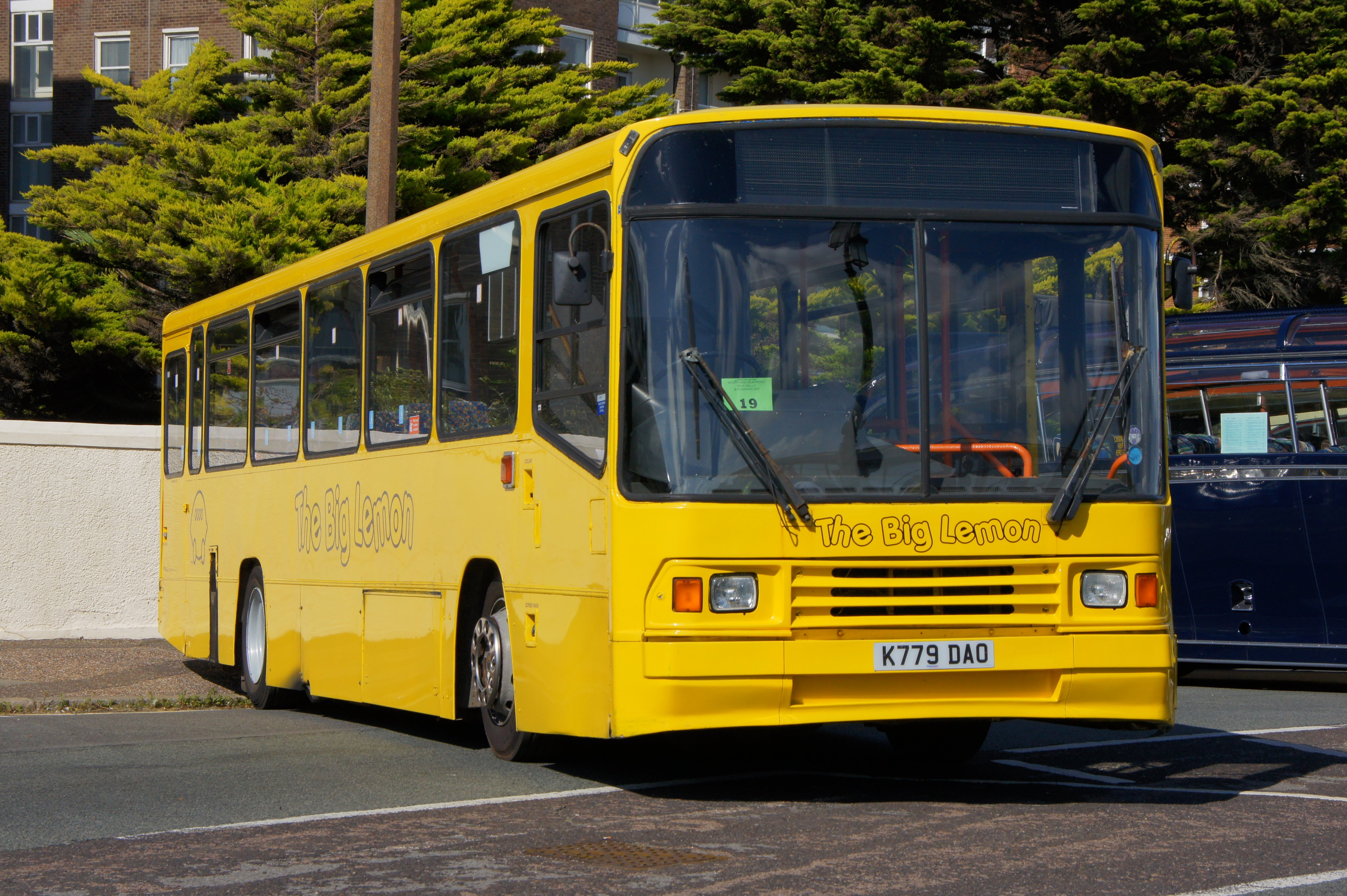
The Big Lemon PS type bodied Volvo B10M

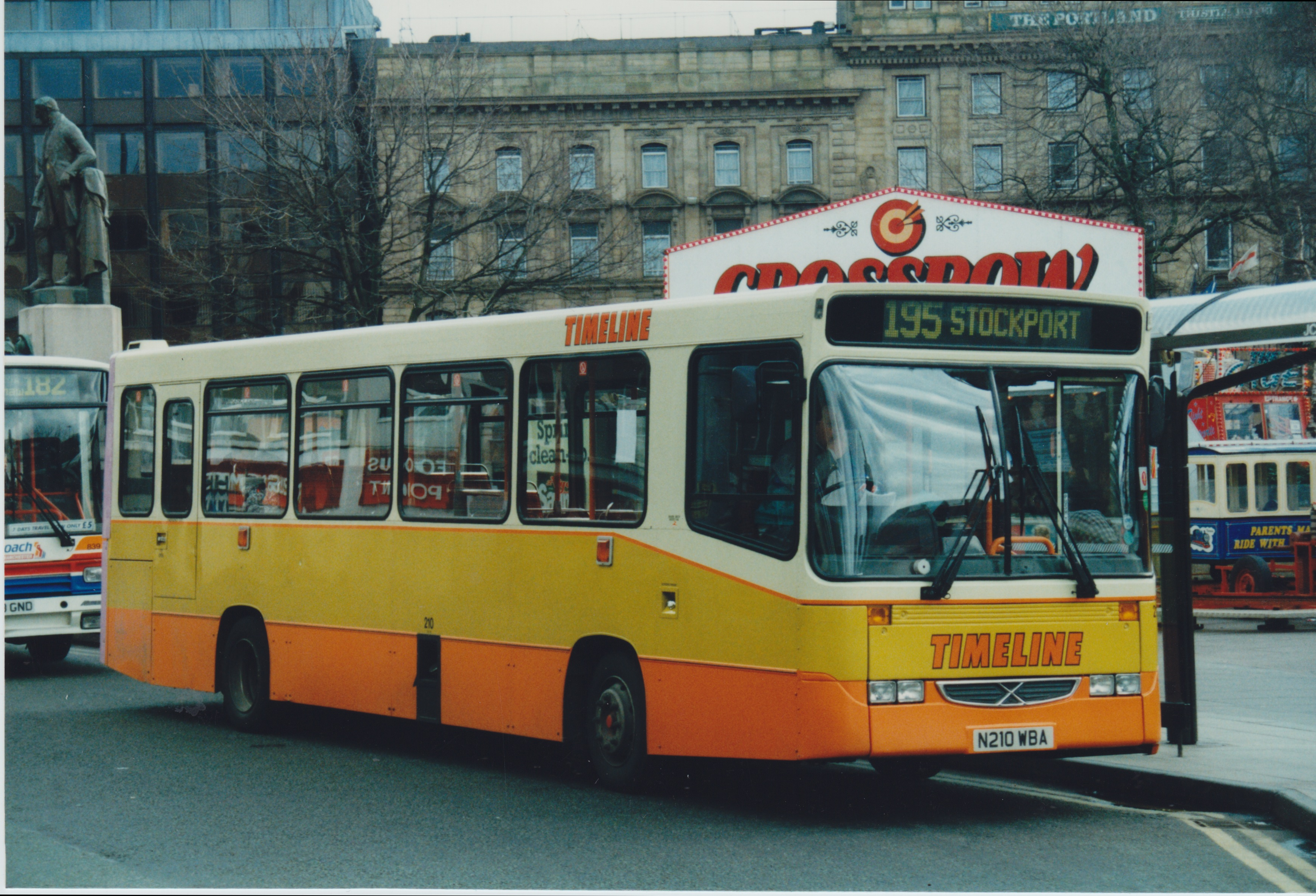
Timeline Dash bodied Volvo B6

=== Alexander (Belfast) buses ===
- X type (unofficial title) – for Leyland Leopard and Bristol RE
- N type – for Leyland Tiger, Lynx, and B21
- Q type – for Leyland Tiger and Volvo B10M
- D type – Alexander (Belfast) version of Alexander RH for Leyland Olympian and Volvo Olympian
- Ultra – Alexander (Belfast) version of Swedish Säffle body for the Volvo B10L
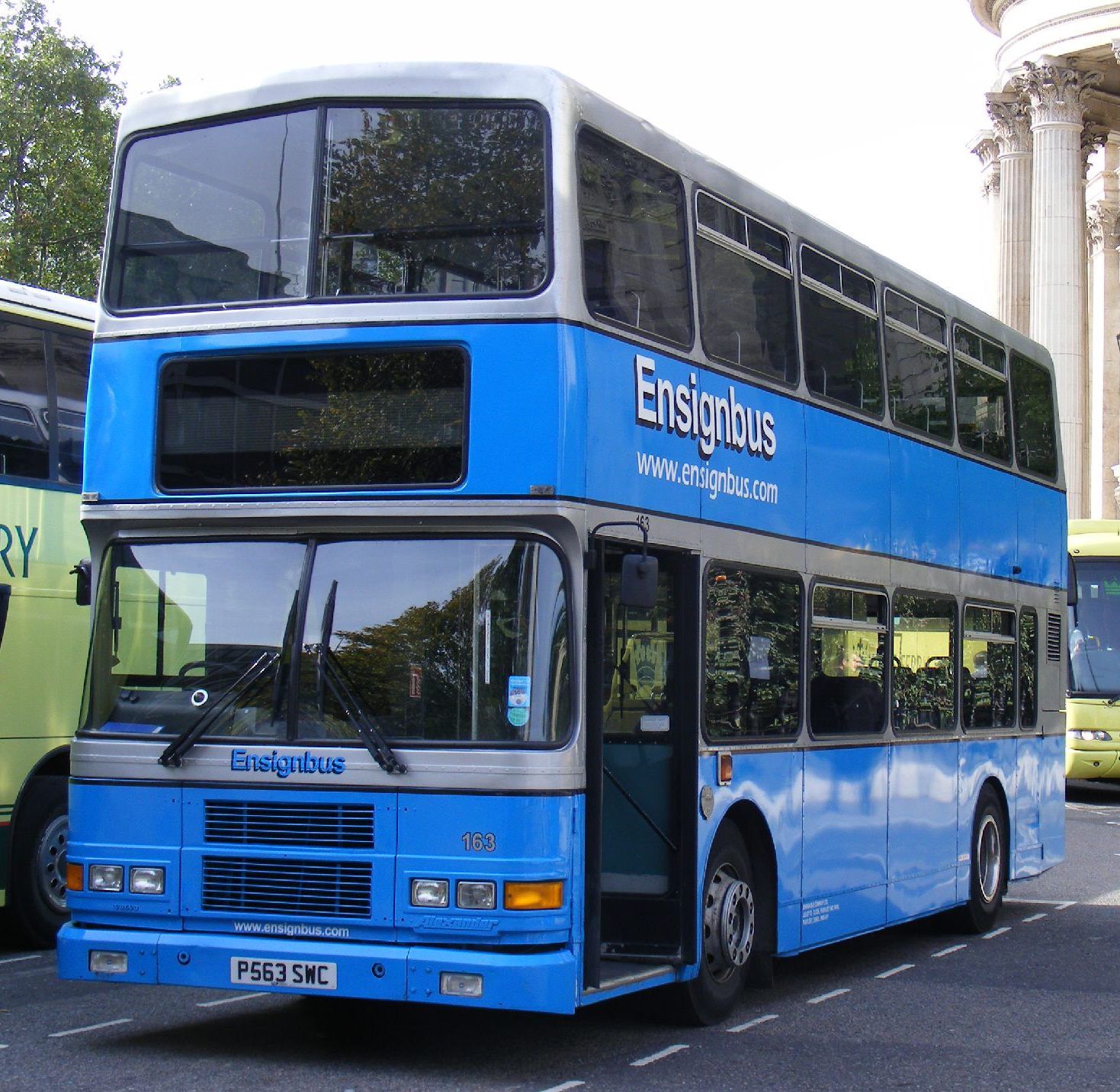
Ensignbus D type bodied Volvo Olympian

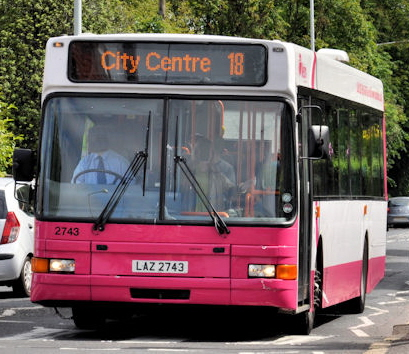
Metro Ultra bodied Volvo B10L

== Sources ==
- P.S.V. Circle (1995), W. Alexander & Sons Ltd; Part One 1914 to 1931 (fleet history PM14), P.S.V. Circle, Harrow.
