= Alexander ALX400 =

2-axle double decker bus body

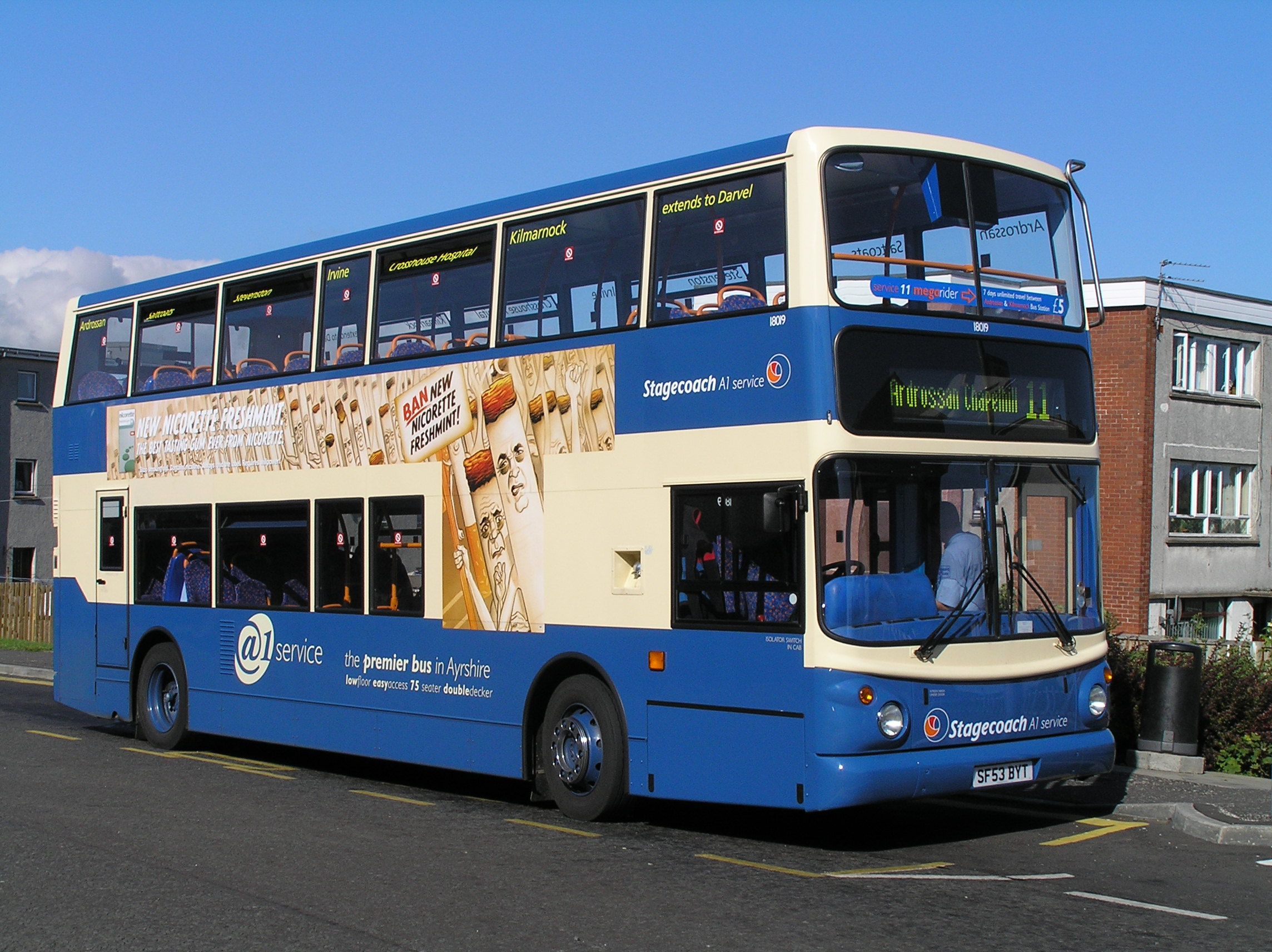
- Stagecoach West Scotland ALX400 bodied Dennis Trident 2 in Ardrossan in 2004

Overview
- Manufacturer: Alexander; TransBus; Alexander Dennis
- Production: 1997–2006
- Assembly: Falkirk, Scotland; Belfast, Northern Ireland

Body and chassis
- Doors: 1 or 2 doors
- Floor type: Low floor
- Chassis: Dennis Trident 2 Volvo B7TL; DAF DB250
- Related: ALX100, ALX200, ALX300, ALX500

Powertrain
- Engine: Cummins C Series/ISCe (Dennis Trident 2); Volvo D7C (Volvo B7TL); DAF (VDL DB250)
- Transmission: ZF Ecomat; Voith DIWA

Dimensions
- Length: 9.9–11.0 m (32 ft 6 in – 36 ft 1 in)
- Width: 2.55 m (8 ft 4 in)
- Height: up to 4.39 m (14 ft 5 in)

Chronology
- Predecessor: Alexander R Type
- Successor: Alexander Dennis Enviro400

The Alexander ALX400 (later known as the TransBus ALX400 and the Alexander Dennis ALX400) is a 2-axle double-decker bus body built by Walter Alexander Coachbuilders (later by TransBus International/Alexander Dennis). It was one of the ALX-series bodywork, all of which (except the ALX100) featured the same designs on the front and rear panels that were originally designed for the new generation of mainly low-floor bus chassis produced since the late 1990s.

== Description ==
First unveiled in 1997, the Alexander ALX400 replaced the step-entrance Alexander R-series and was fitted to numerous chassis, including the Dennis/TransBus Trident 2, the DAF/VDL DB250LF and the Volvo B7TL.

Various seating configurations were available, with Transport for London (TfL) specification models fitted with a central exit door. There are typically 45 seats on the upper deck, and between 17 and 22 seats on the lower deck depending on chassis variant and length. Longer models for use elsewhere have up to 47 seats on the upper deck, and 24 below with a central door. Stagecoach subsidiaries outside London have ALX400s on long-wheelbase Dennis Trident 2 chassis, fitted with 51 seats upstairs (47 on later models) and 28 downstairs. These buses have been used all over the UK, in major cities including London, Birmingham, Manchester and Newcastle.

== Operators ==
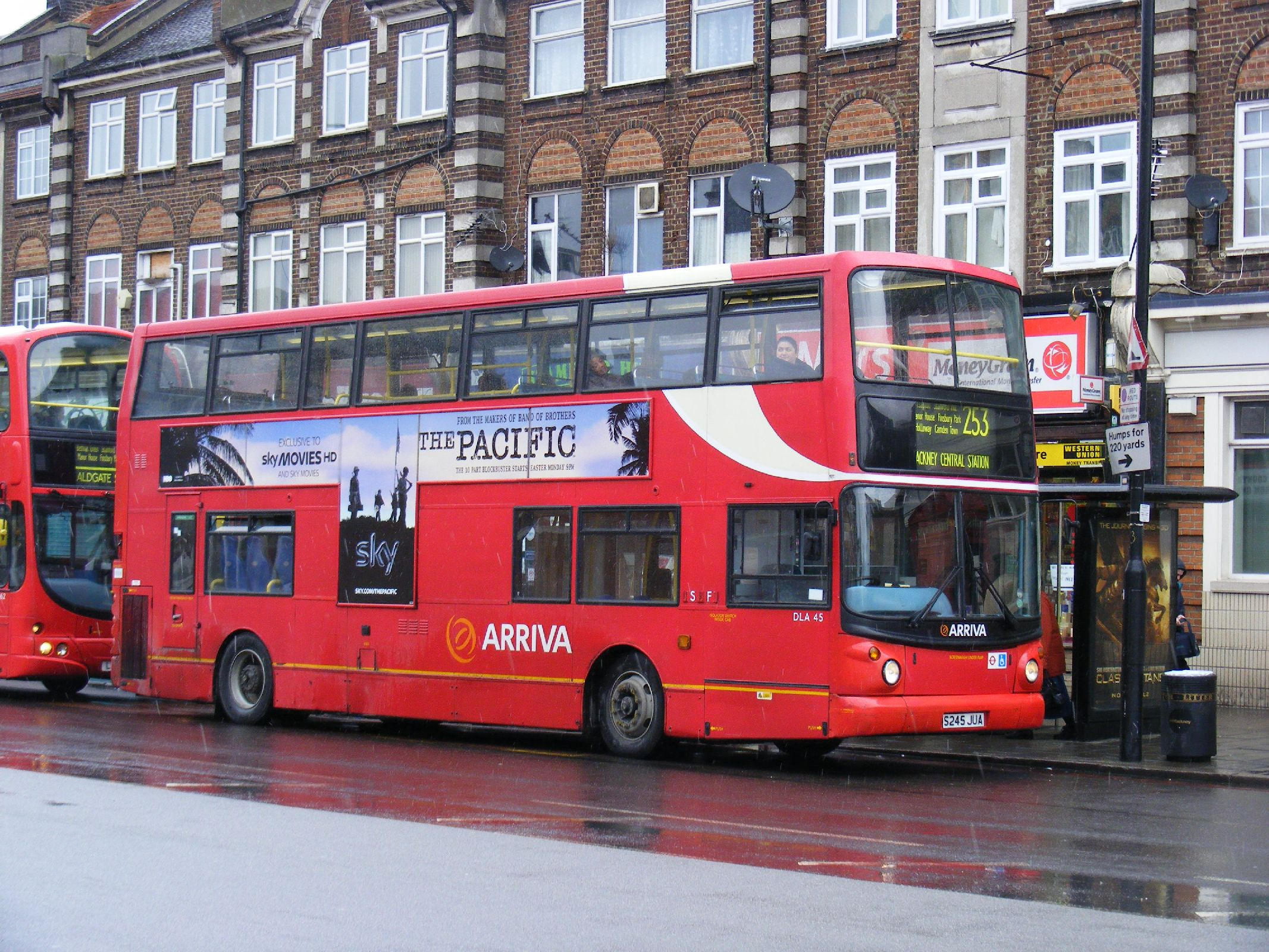
Arriva London ALX400 bodied DAF DB250LF on route 253 in Stamford Hill in March 2010

The Alexander ALX400 proved to be a major success with the major operators of the United Kingdom, with large numbers of the buses serving London as well as the rest of the UK. Arriva London took delivery of the first ALX400 in May 1998, numbered DLA1 and built on DAF DB250LF chassis, which was also London's first low-floor double decker. Arriva London went on to order 388 more ALX400s on DAF DB250LF chassis between 1998 and 2005; between 2017 and 2019, DLA1 was restored to as-new condition by Alexander Dennis with the initial intention for display at the London Transport Museum before later being sold into private ownership.

From its introduction until 2006, the Alexander ALX400 on the Dennis Trident 2 chassis was the favoured 2-axle double-decker bus model for the Stagecoach Group. Stagecoach London operated the most ALX400s in the group, continuously taking delivery of 998 ALX400s to its various garages from 1998 to 2006. Stagecoach's first low-floor double-decker bus outside London was one of a pair of ALX400-bodied Dennis Tridents that were delivered to Stagecoach Manchester in 1998; this bus was later donated to and restored by the Museum of Transport, Greater Manchester. Deliveries were made to Stagecoach operations across the United Kingdom such as in Oxford, Devon, Canterbury, Cambridge, and Kingston upon Hull, among others.

In London, other operators of Alexander ALX400s on Dennis Trident 2 and Volvo B7TL chassis included Arriva London, who took delivery of 179 ALX400-bodied B7TLs alongside their DAF DB250LFs; London United, who took delivery of 156 ALX400-bodied Tridents and 62 B7TLs; Metroline, who took delivery of 154 ALX400-bodied Tridents; Connex, who took 128 Trident-bodied ALX400s; First London, who took delivery of 64 Tridents and 27 B7TLs; London Central, who took one batch of 46 ALX400-bodied Volvo B7TLs in 1999 before moving onto the Plaxton President, and Armchair Passenger Transport, who took 22 ALX400-bodied Tridents in 2002.

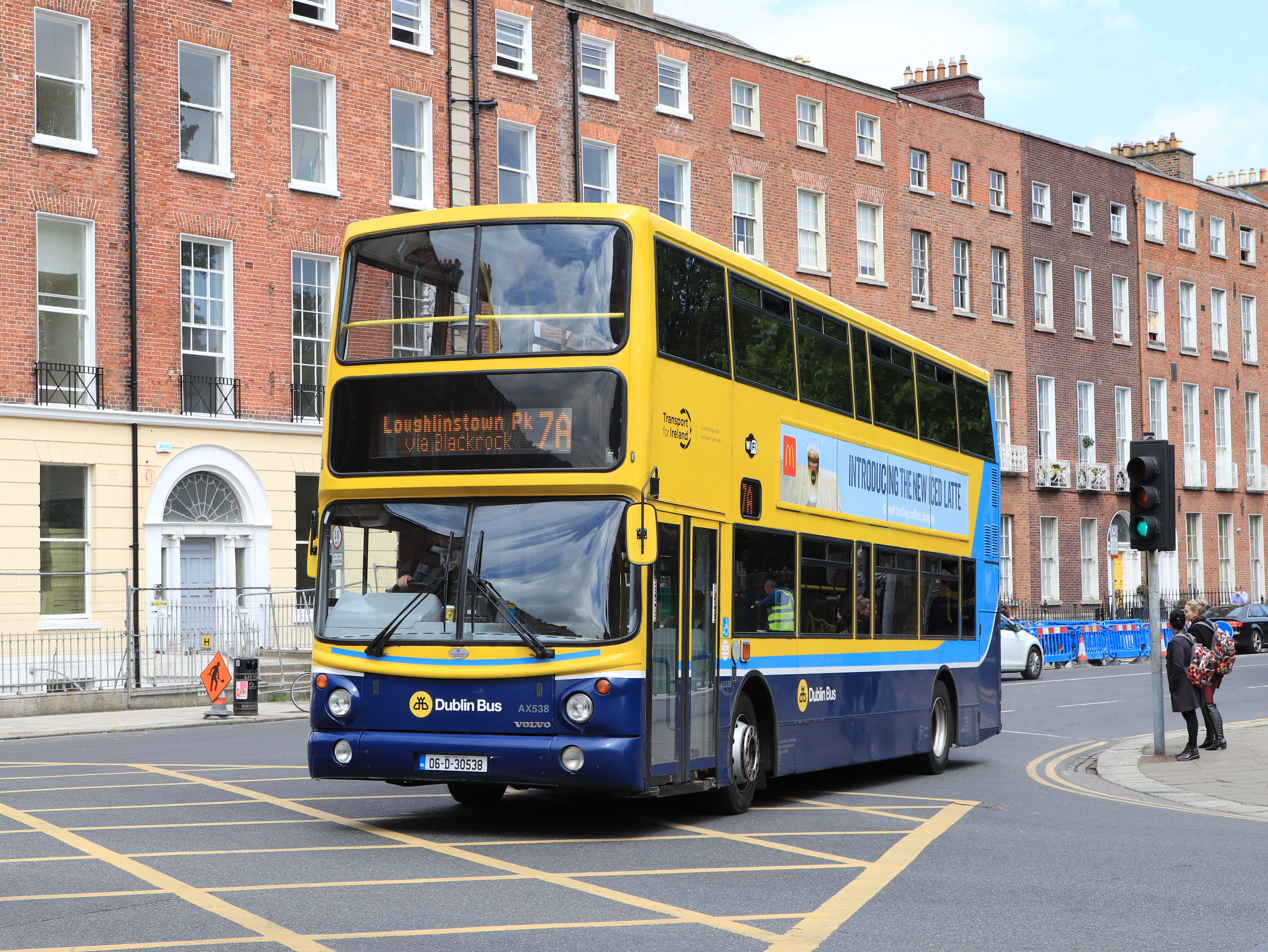
Dublin Bus Alexander Dennis ALX400 bodied Volvo B7TL in Dublin in 2019

The ALX400 was also popular with Dublin Bus of Ireland, which ordered 658 between 2000 and 2006. All but ten were fitted on Volvo B7TL chassis, with a batch of ten fitted on the TransBus Trident chassis delivered in 2003 to compare against the B7TLs with a view to splitting future orders. Most of these featured 76 seat single door bodies although there were various seating capacities used on a small minority of rail and airport link services; Summerhill based AV 116-130 were built with dual-door bodies for use on the Airlink services.

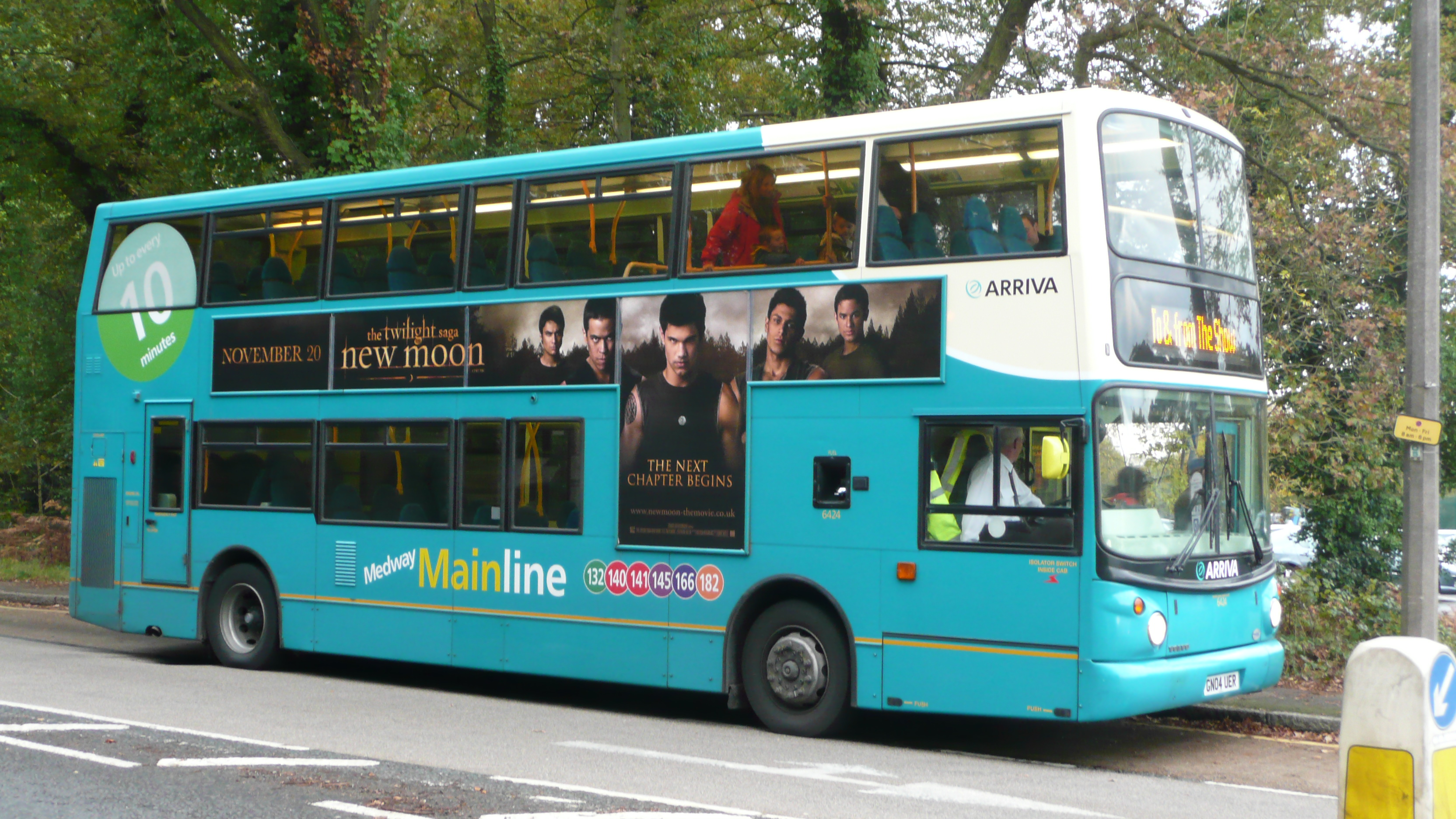
Arriva Medway Towns TransBus ALX400 bodied Volvo B7TL in Weybridge in 2009

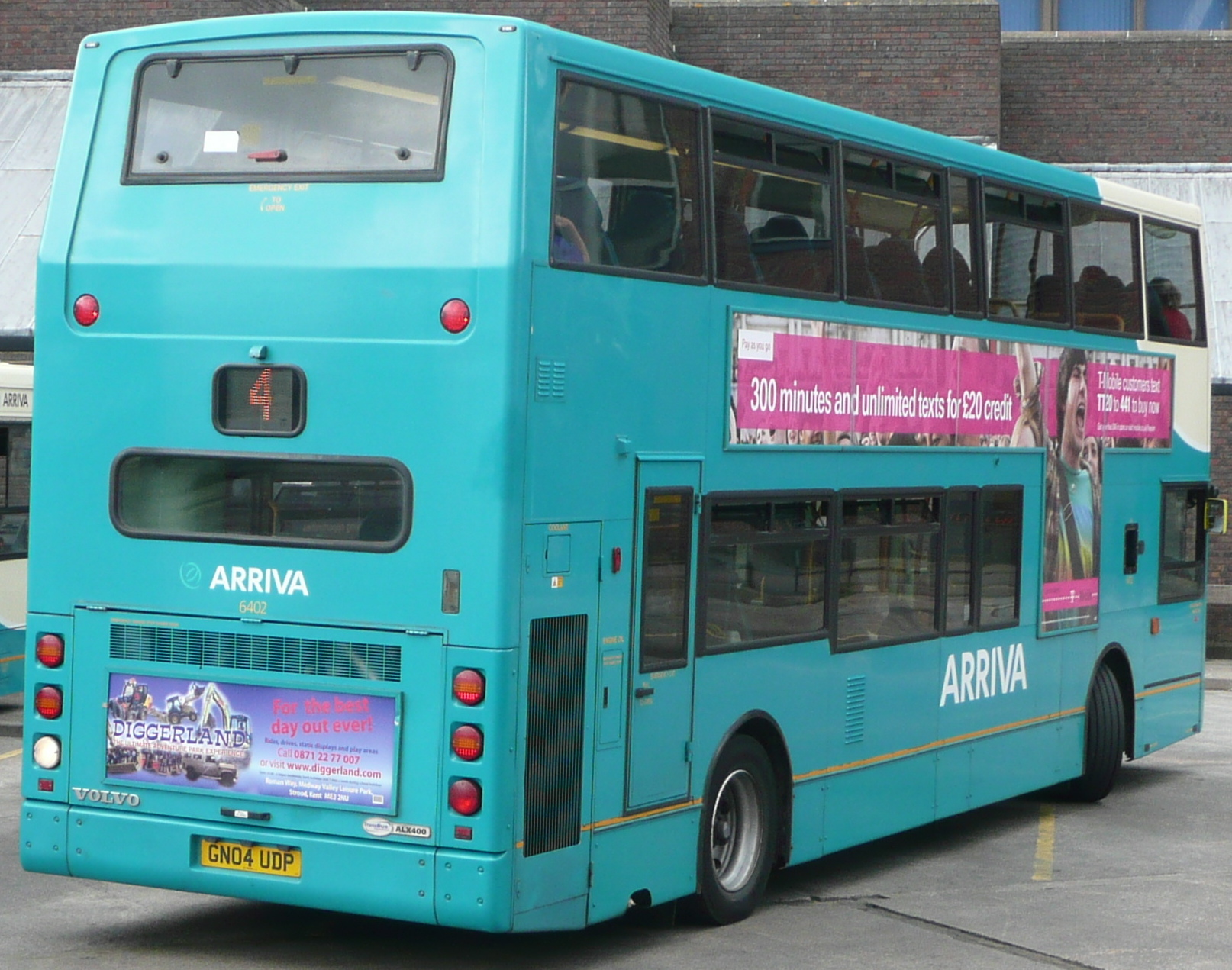
Arriva Guildford & West Surrey TransBus ALX400 bodied Volvo B7TL in Guildford in 2009

Alexander ALX400s on both the Dennis Trident 2 and Volvo B7TL chassis were also extensively delivered to the National Express's bus operations in the West Midlands, Coventry and Dundee, with over 400 orders received for all three operations from 2001 to 2005. Translink of Northern Ireland purchased over 150 Alexander ALX400s on Volvo B7TL chassis for its Ulsterbus and Citybus (later rebranded Metro) operations between 2001 and 2006, with the first batch of 20 delivered to Citybus in 2001 marking the return of double-decker buses to Belfast for the first time since their withdrawal in 1989.

Outside London, Arriva ordered ALX400s on both the Dennis Trident and Volvo B7TL chassis in comparatively smaller numbers compared to Stagecoach and the FirstGroup. On the Volvo B7TL chassis, 20 ALX400s were delivered to Arriva Yorkshire in 2000, 49 were delivered to Arriva Medway Towns in 2004 as part of Operation Overdrive, two ALX400s were delivered to Arriva North East in 2005 as part of a larger investment in 24 new buses for the region, and 30 ALX400s were delivered to Arriva Merseyside in 2006. On the Dennis Trident chassis, 30 ALX400s were delivered to Arriva Shires & Essex in 2000.

Smaller operators of Alexander ALX400-bodied buses included Lothian Buses, who had five delivered on Dennis Trident chassis in 1999; UK North, who had four ALX400s on DAF DB250 chassis delivered in 1999; the Oxford Bus Company, who had 20 dual-door ALX400s on Dennis Trident 2 chassis delivered for use on the Oxford Park and Ride in 1999; East Yorkshire Motor Services and Finglands Coachways, who took delivery of two ALX400s each on Dennis Trident 2 chassis for evaluation against Plaxton President-bodied Volvo B7TLs in 2000; and Newport Transport, who took delivery of six ALX400s on Dennis Trident chassis in 2000.

In late 2005, Alexander Dennis launched the Enviro400 model, intended as a replacement for the ALX400. Despite the bulk of the 2006 Stagecoach double-decker bus order favouring the Enviro400 model, also chosen by London operator Metroline, in July 2006 Dublin Bus placed a repeat order for 100 ALX400 on Volvo B7TL chassis. Production of the ALX400 bodywork ceased after the delivery of these 100 ALX400-bodied Volvo B7TLs between late 2006 and early 2007.
