= Alexander ALX300 =

Low-floor single-deck bus body on DAF, MAN and Volvo chassis

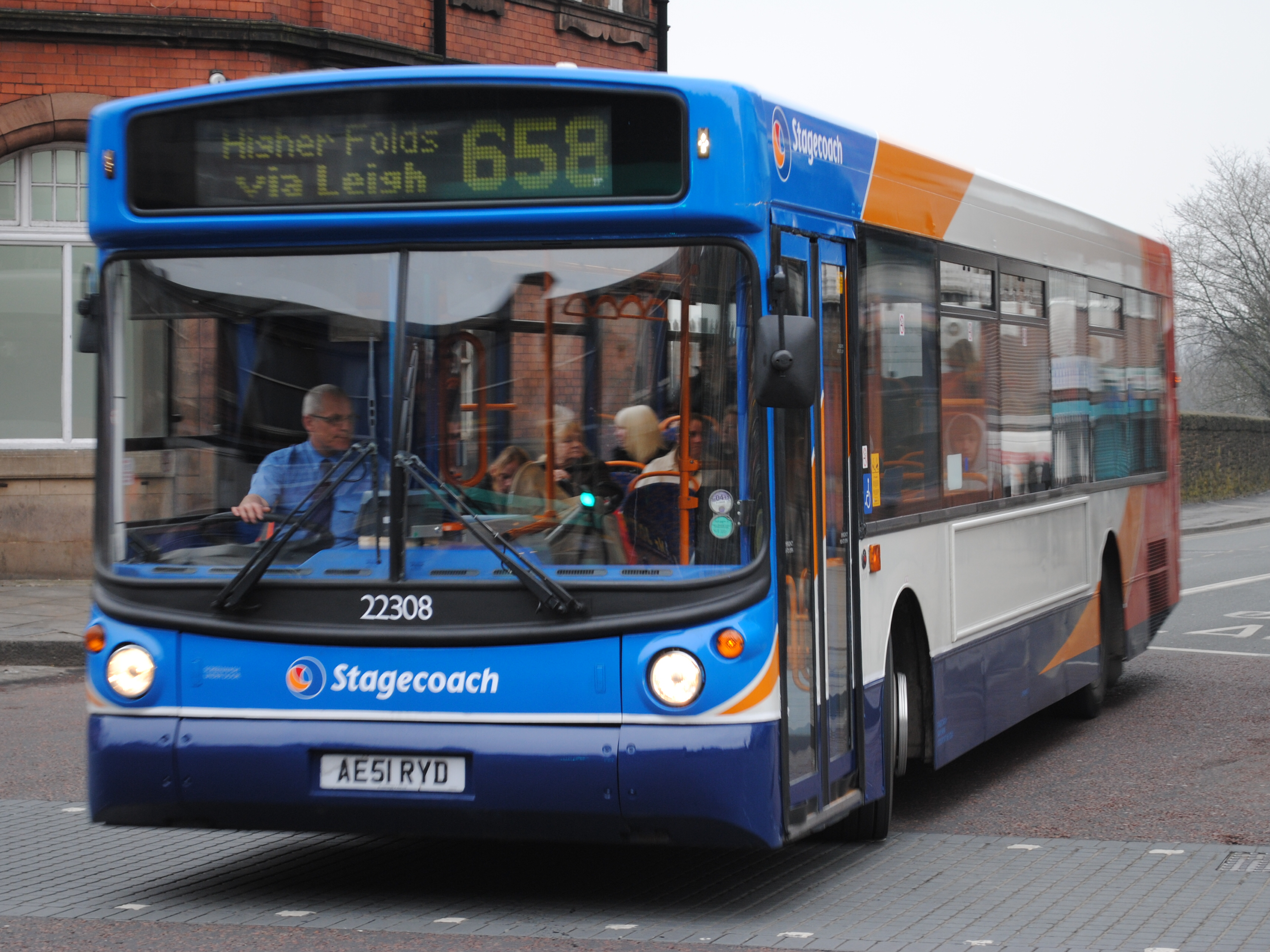
- Stagecoach in Manchester ALX300 bodied MAN 18.220 in March 2013

Overview
- Manufacturer: Alexander; TransBus; Alexander Dennis
- Production: 1997–2007
- Assembly: Falkirk, Scotland

Body and chassis
- Doors: 1
- Floor type: Low floor
- Chassis: DAF SB220; MAN 18.220; Volvo B10BLE
- Related: Alexander ALX200; Alexander ALX400; Alexander ALX500

Powertrain
- Engine: MAN D0836 (18.220); DAF GS160M (SB220); Volvo DH10A (B10BLE)
- Capacity: 34 to 41 seated
- Transmission: Voith; ZF

Dimensions
- Length: 10.7–11.5 metres (35–38 ft)
- Width: 2.50 metres (8 ft 2 in)
- Height: 3.00 metres (9.84 ft)

Chronology
- Predecessor: Alexander Strider; Alexander PS type; Alexander Ultra
- Successor: Alexander Dennis Enviro300

The Alexander ALX300 (later known as the TransBus ALX300 and the Alexander Dennis ALX300) was a low-floor bus body manufactured by Alexander and later Alexander Dennis in Falkirk, Scotland. It was launched in 1997 as a replacement for the Strider and the PS type.

Sharing the same design cues of the smaller single-deck Alexander ALX200 and double-deck Alexander ALX400, the ALX300 has a rounded roof dome similar to the ALX200, a deep double-curvature windscreen with plastic mouldings under the windscreen to make it look deeper and a separate destination sign.

== Operators ==
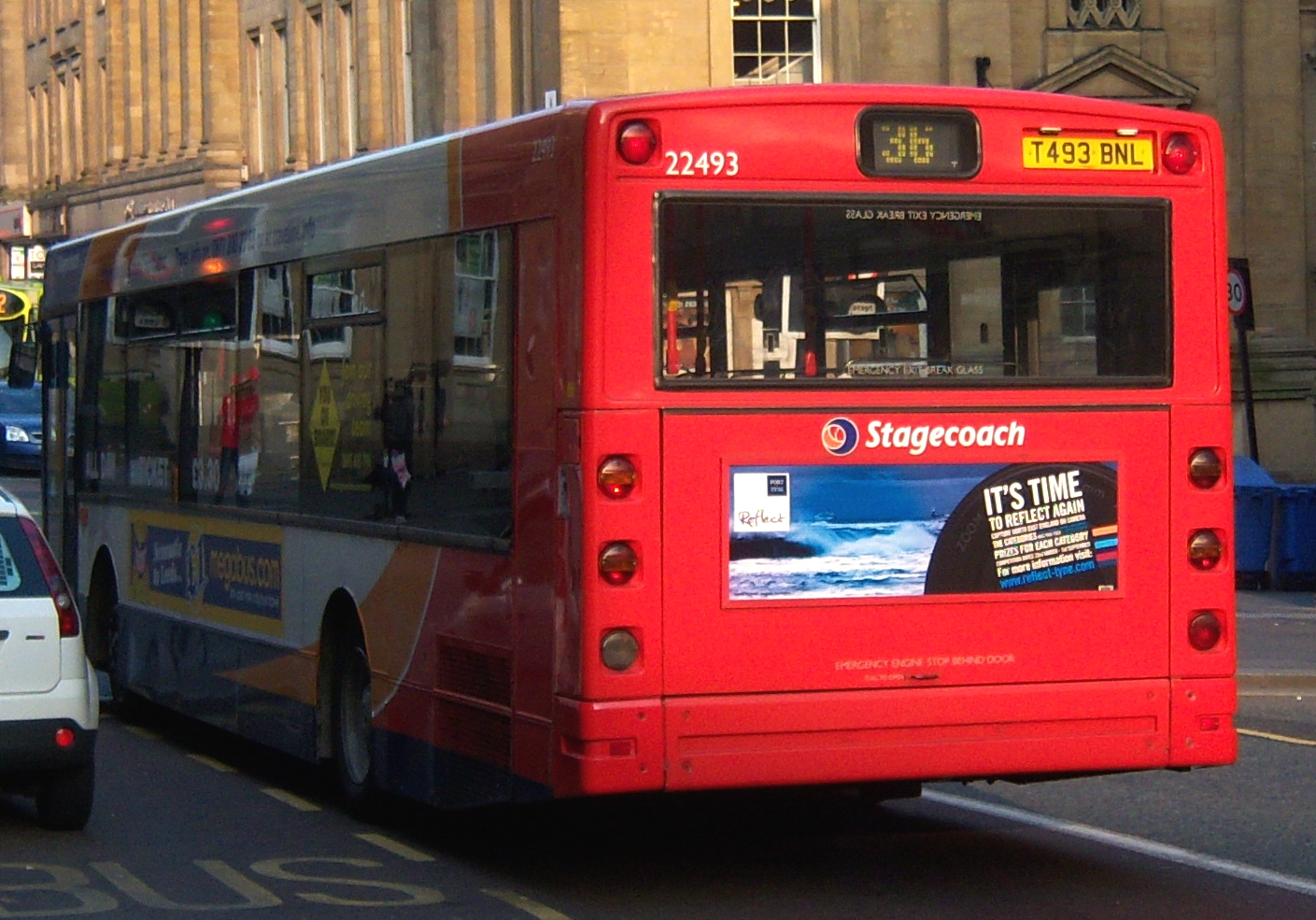
Stagecoach North East ALX300 bodied MAN 18.220 rear in Newcastle upon Tyne in April 2009

The first 23 Alexander ALX300s entered service with Stagecoach Busways from early 1998 onwards, all of which were built on the Volvo B10BLE chassis. Stagecoach soon chose to standardise on ALX300s on the MAN 18.220 chassis by ordering 150 of the type following the Coach & Bus '97 expo, taking delivery of its first 28 for its Thames Transit subsidiary's Oxford operations from November 1998 onwards, followed by major batch orders for its Manchester, Busways, Transit, Cumberland, Fife Scottish and Bluebird subsidiaries.

Orders for ALX300s on the MAN chassis continued following the group's rebranding in November 2000, despite the arrival of the Alexander Dennis Enviro300 in 2001, which was aimed at the ALX300's market. The first ALX300s ordered following this rebrand were delivered to Stagecoach East in late 2001, with 40 ALX300s on MAN 18.220 chassis being used to relaunch its Cambridge bus network under the 'citi' brand. Stagecoach North East, formed from the combination of the Busways and Transit operations, took delivery of an additional 71 ALX300s between 2003 and 2006, while further orders were delivered to the group's Bluebird, East Scotland, Lincolnshire, Manchester, and West Scotland operations up until 2006. The final ALX300s for the group, as well as the final ALX300s produced, were delivered to Stagecoach Yorkshire in 2007, after which Stagecoach moved over to the Alexander Dennis Enviro300 on MAN 18.240 chassis as its standard single-deck bus.

Compared to the large quantity purchased by the Stagecoach Group, Alexander ALX300s were sold in smaller numbers to independent operators and other bus operating groups. Arriva were the second-largest operator of ALX300s, with 51 delivered on DAF SB220 chassis for Arriva Yorkshire during 1998, with smaller numbers on Volvo B10BLE chassis following for Arriva Fox County, Arriva Manchester, Arriva Northumbria and Arriva The Shires during 2000; First Glasgow also took delivery of 32 of the type that same year, these being the only ALX300s purchased by the FirstGroup.

Independent operators of Alexander ALX300s included East Yorkshire Motor Services, who took delivery of ten ALX300s on Volvo B10BLE chassis in May 2000, with ten more on MAN 18.220 chassis being delivered to the operator in July 2002.
