= Alexander PS type =

Step-entrance single-deck bus bodywork

Alexander PS-type
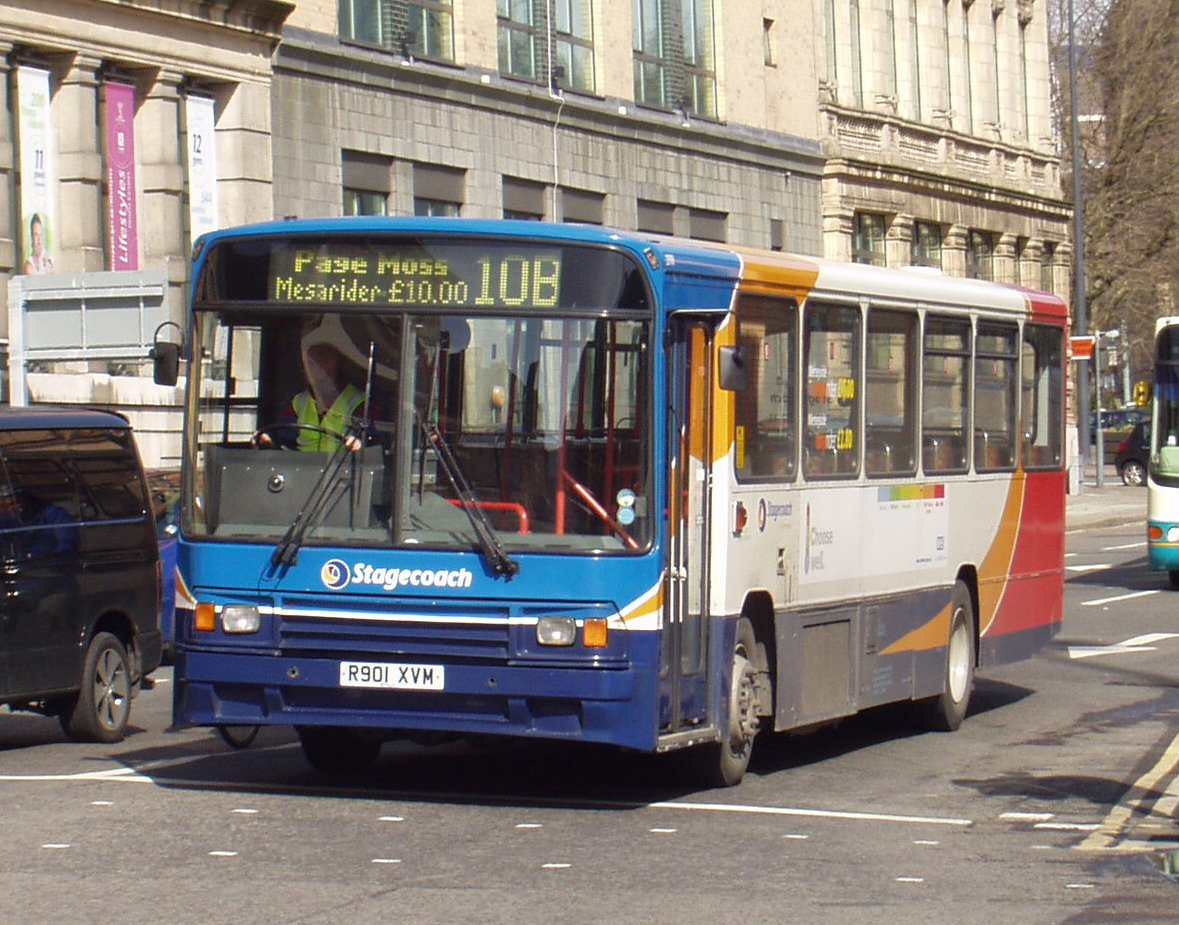
- Alexander PS-type bodied Volvo B10M operated by Stagecoach Merseyside

Overview
- Manufacturer: Walter Alexander
- Production: 1988–1998
- Assembly: Falkirk, Scotland

Body and chassis
- Doors: 1 or 2 doors
- Floor type: Step entrance
- Chassis: Volvo B10M; Leyland Lynx; Mercedes-Benz O405; Dennis Lance; Iveco Turbocity; Scania N113

Powertrain
- Transmission: ZF or Voith

Dimensions
- Length: 11.9m
- Width: 2.5m
- Height: 3.0m

Chronology
- Successor: Alexander ALX200; Alexander ALX300

The Alexander PS-type was a step-entrance single-deck bus body built by Walter Alexander Coachbuilders in Falkirk, Scotland and was produced from 1988 to the late 1990s on the Dennis Lance, Mercedes-Benz O405, Scania N113 and Volvo B10M chassis.

The Alexander PS-type was developed from the Alexander's single-deck export body for Singapore Bus Services, and was based on the domestic P-type with a revised front end. It was initially launched in the United Kingdom on the Scania N113CR chassis in 1988.

The Alexander PS-type was ultimately succeeded by the Alexander ALX200 and Alexander ALX300 low-floor bus bodies.

== Operators ==
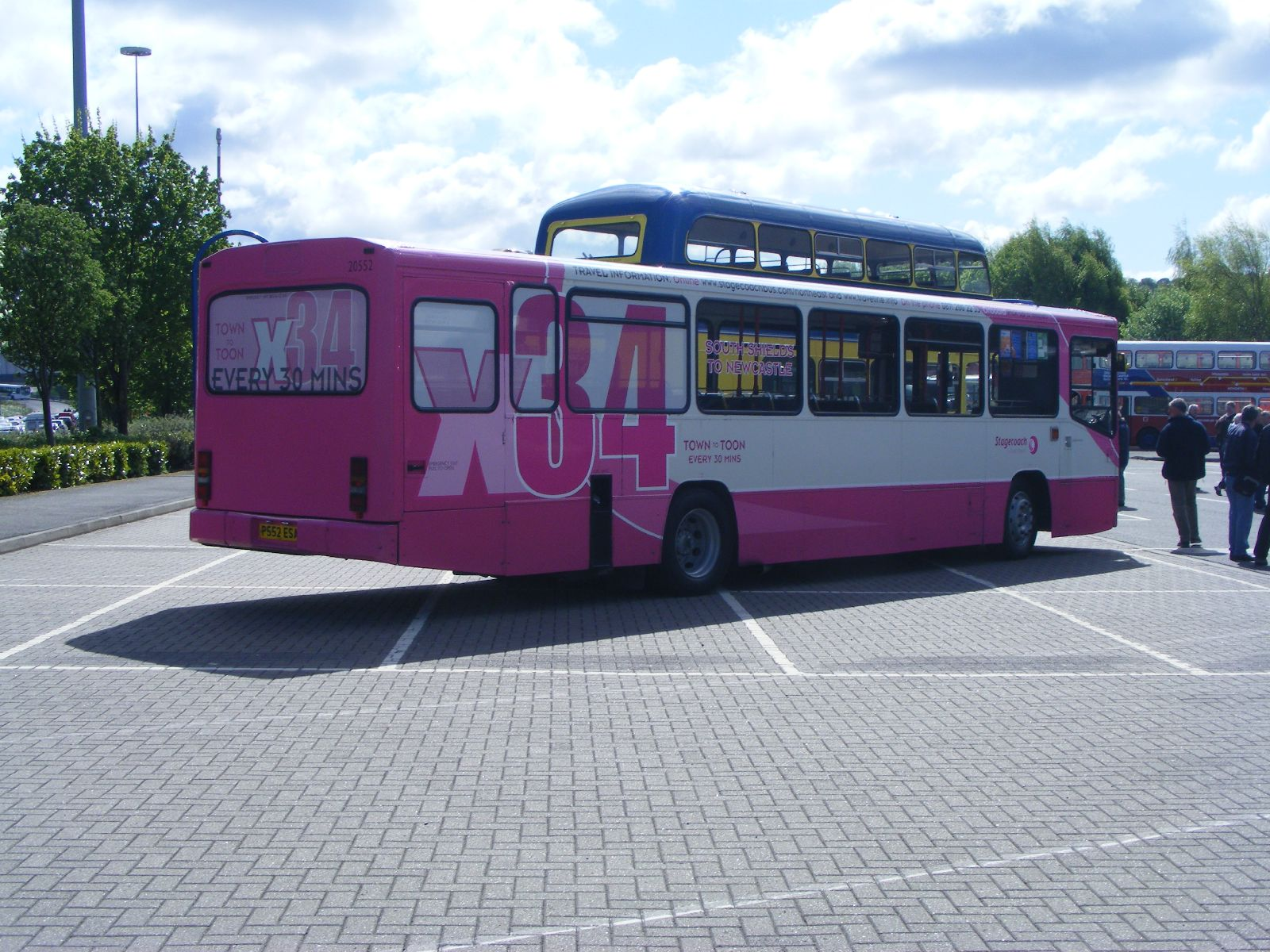
Alexander PS rear in May 2009

The Alexander PS-type on the Volvo B10M chassis was the primary single decker for the Stagecoach Group through the 1990s, with 100 delivered to Stagecoach Cumberland from late 1992 following production delays with the Volvo B6 midibus chassis, while Stagecoach Manchester also took on comparatively large numbers of PS types-bodied B10Ms. Most were withdrawn by 2016 due to regulations mandating low-floor buses, but some were retained as late as 2020 as school buses by Stagecoach Cumbria & North Lancashire.

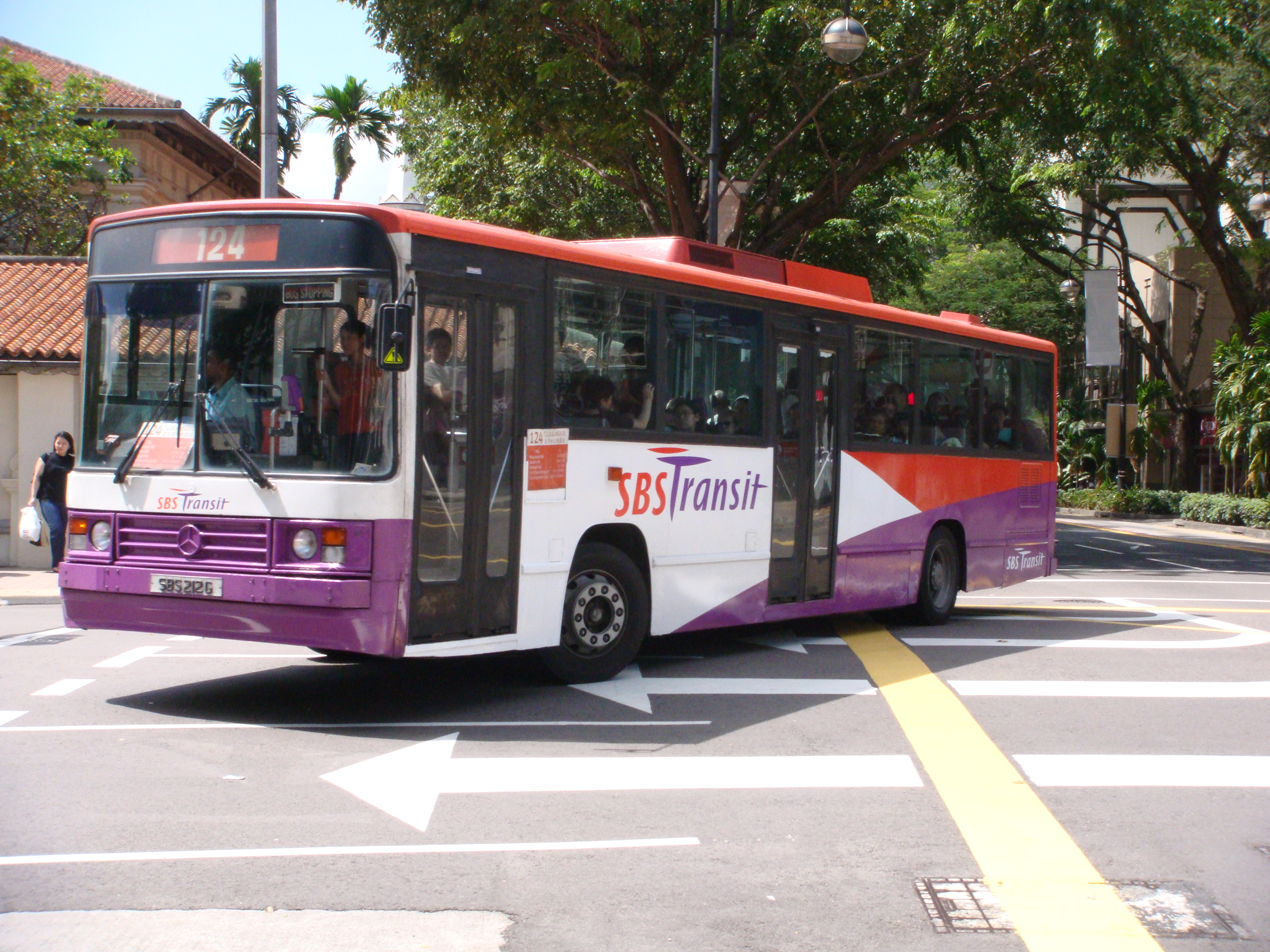
SBS Transit Alexander PS bodied Mercedes-Benz O405 in January 2009

The second-biggest operator of the Alexander PS-type were Mainline Buses, who ordered a total of 180 Alexander PS-types on Volvo B10M chassis from 1990 to 1996. Mainline's first Alexander PS-types were the first to be bodied on a Volvo chassis. Kelvin Central Buses also purchased 60 PS-types between 1995 and 1997. Following the purchase of Mainline and SB Holdings by the FirstGroup, these buses were dispersed around First's other operations.

On the Scania N113CRB chassis, Busways Travel Services took an order of 20 Scanias with PS-type bodies, while Nottingham City Transport took an order of eight. Yorkshire Traction purchased five Scania PS-types in 1992 as their first new full-size buses since deregulation.

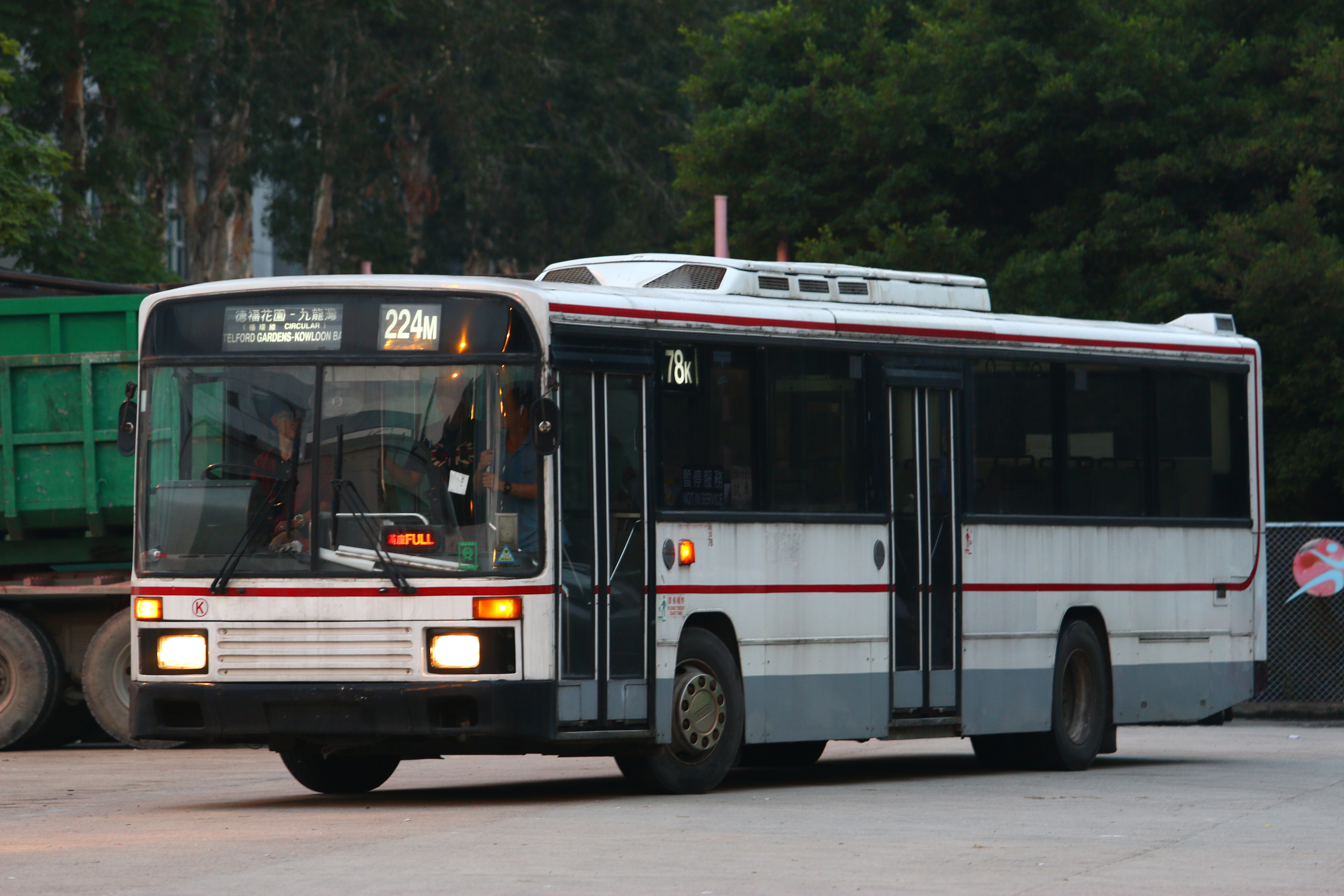
Kowloon Motor Bus Alexander PS bodied Dennis Lance in November 2013.

Sixteen Dennis Lances with dual door Alexander PS-type bodies were built for London Buses subsidiary Selkent, while in Hong Kong, Kowloon Motor Bus took on 24 Lances with PS-type bodywork.

Two examples on the Mercedes-Benz O405 chassis was built with Alexander PS-type bodies in 1992, one being a rigid Mercedes demonstrator and a sole articulated example being bodied for Grampian Regional Transport. These were branded as the Cityranger.
