= Alexander ALX200 =

Single-decker bus body

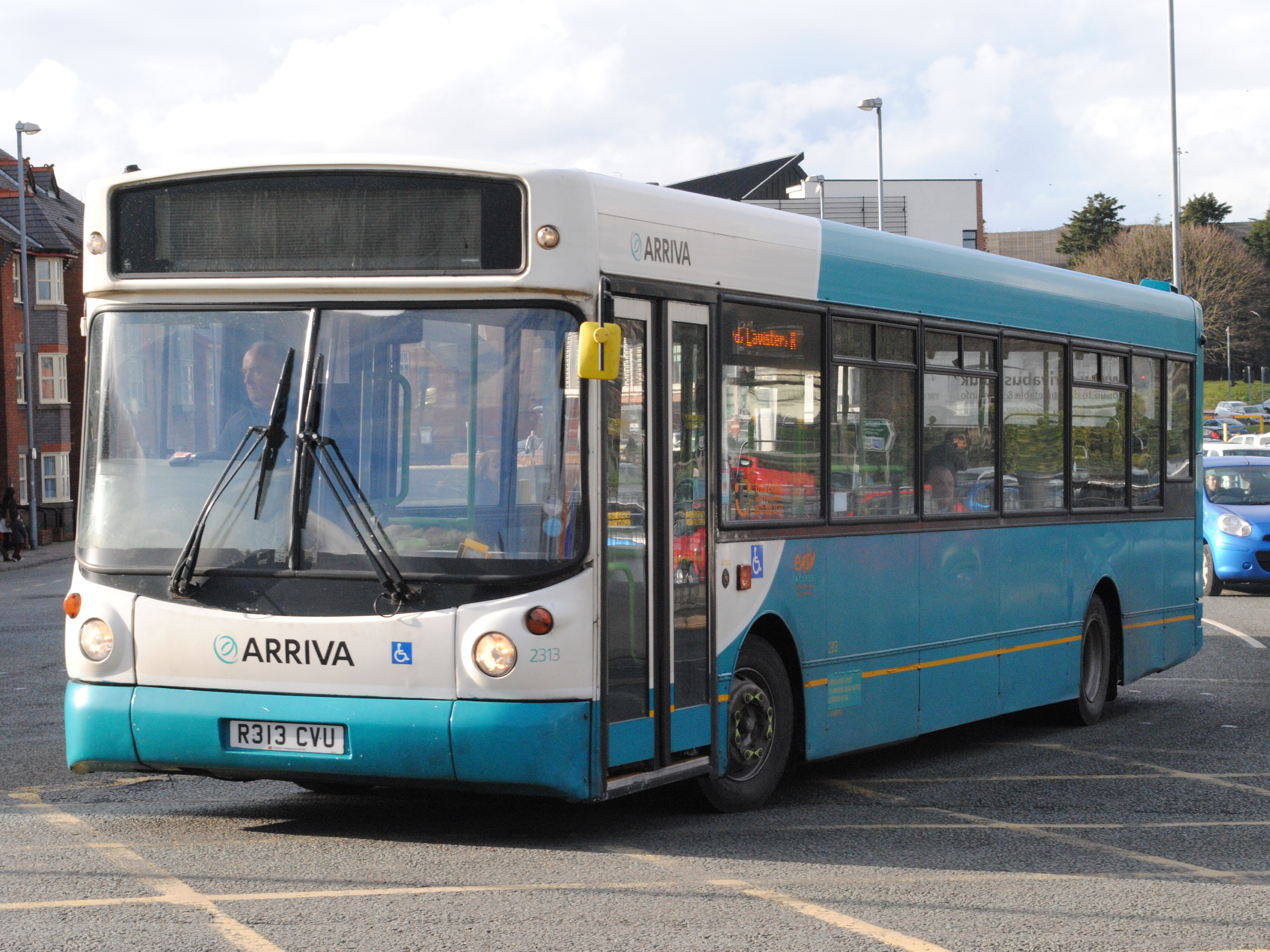
- Arriva Buses Wales ALX200 bodied Dennis Dart SLF in 2013

Overview
- Manufacturer: Alexander/TransBus
- Production: 1996–2001

Body and chassis
- Doors: 1 or 2 doors
- Floor type: Low floor
- Chassis: Dennis Dart SLF; Volvo B6LE
- Related: ALX100, ALX300, ALX400, ALX500

Powertrain
- Engine: Cummins B Series (Dennis Dart SLF); Volvo D6A (Volvo B6LE)
- Transmission: Allison/ZF Ecomat

Dimensions
- Length: 8.8–10.7 m (28 ft 10 in – 35 ft 1 in)
- Width: around 2.4 m (7 ft 10 in)
- Height: 3.0 m (9 ft 10 in)

Chronology
- Predecessor: Alexander Dash
- Successor: Plaxton Pointer

The Alexander ALX200 was a single-decker bus body built by Alexander of the United Kingdom. It was created for low-floor bus chassis produced from the late 1990s and was launched in spring 1996 as a low-floor replacement of the Alexander Dash. It was marketed in Alexander's 'ALX' series to fill in the gap between the ALX100 minibus and the ALX300 full-size single-decker.

== Design ==
As compared to the Dash, the ALX200 has a more rounded appearance. The styling is completely different from the Dash body, with a rounded roof dome and deep double-curvature windscreen with plastic mouldings under the windscreen to make it look deeper, and large circular headlights and circular front indicators, it also has a separately mounted destination box. The body was primarily built on Dennis Dart SLF and Volvo B6LE. It was given a mild front end refresh during 2001.

With the formation of TransBus International, the ALX200 was phased out in favour of the more successful Plaxton Pointer in 2001 when production of the Pointer was moved from Scarborough to Falkirk, where Walter Alexander was based.

== Operators ==
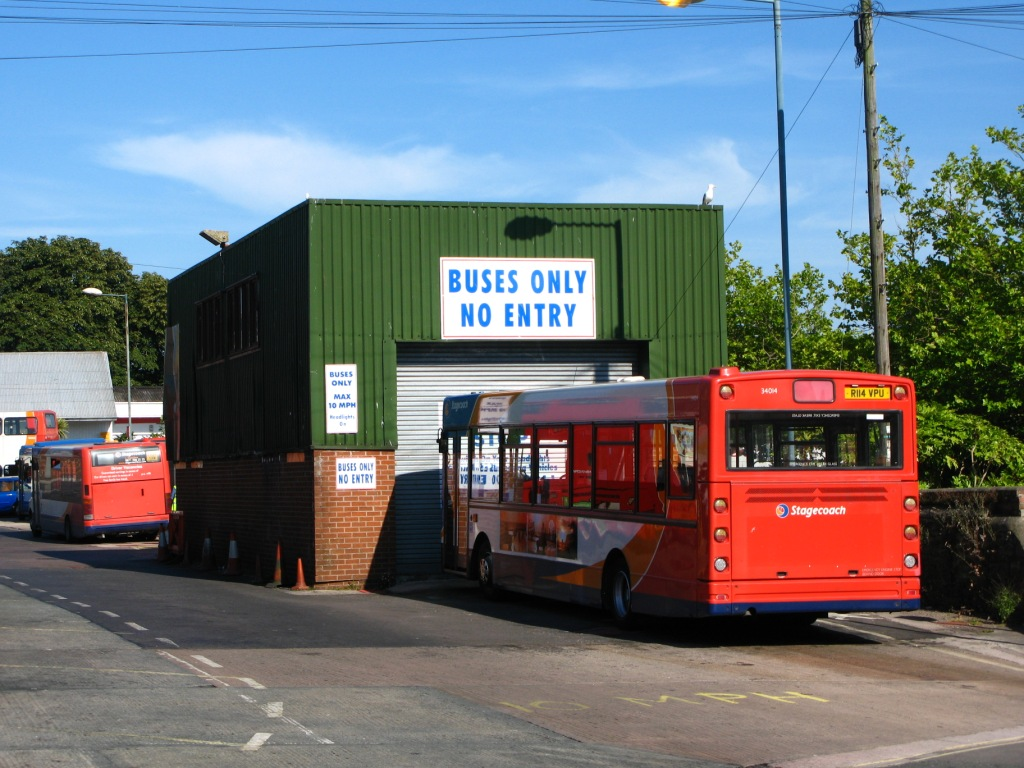
Stagecoach South West ALX200 bodied Dennis Dart SLF in Paignton in July 2011

Operators of the Alexander ALX200 in the United Kingdom mainly included Stagecoach, whose orders included 90 ALX200s built on the Volvo B6LE chassis, the FirstGroup, Arriva and Newport Transport, who operated ALX200s on 8.8m Dart SLF chassis.

The ALX200 on Dennis Dart SLF chassis was purchased by some Cowie Group companies, with Yorkshire Woollen taking delivery of 30 of the type in April 1997 for services in Dewsbury, replacing the operator's last Leyland Nationals. Grey-Green also took delivery of seventeen of the type in April 1997, while Clydeside 2000 took delivery of ten ALX200s between May and June 1997.

In London, the Alexander ALX200 on Dennis Dart SLF chassis proved most popular with Stagecoach London's East London and Selkent operations, who were both the largest customers for the ALX200 throughout its production run. A total of 216 were delivered between 1997 and 2001, with thirteen of these used for a contract route connecting Liverpool Street station and London City Airport. Arriva London, meanwhile, took delivery of 38 ALX200 bodied Dart SLFs between 1998 and 2000, acquiring a further nineteen that were originally new to Arriva East Herts & Essex in May 2000, while elsewhere, Connex took delivery of 18 between 2000 and 2001, Epsom Coaches took delivery of 14 between 1999 and 2001, Armchair Passenger Transport took delivery of 13 in May 1999, and Metrobus took delivery of three in July 1999.

=== Exports ===
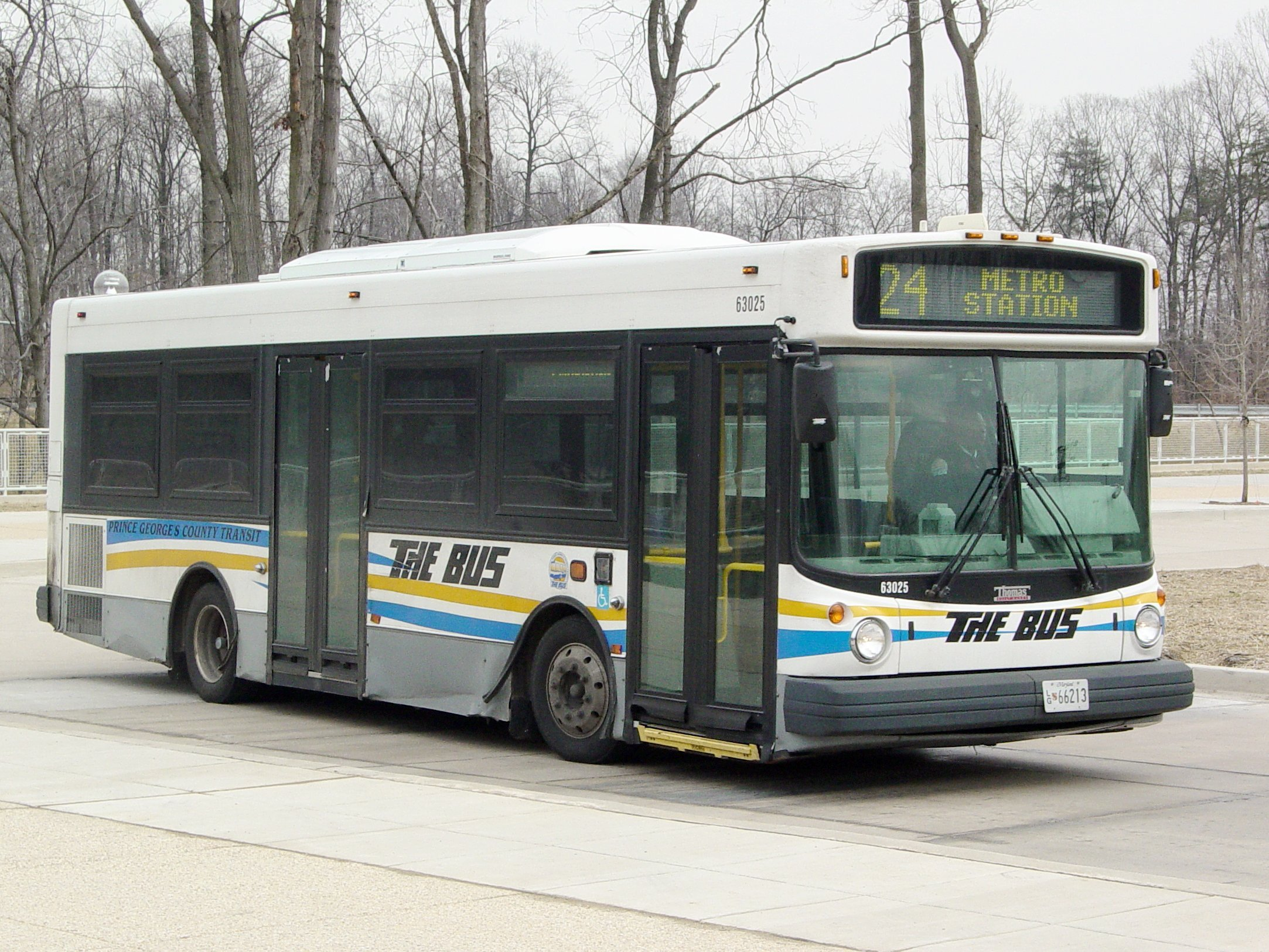
A Thomas Built Buses SLF 200 operated by TheBus in Prince George's County, Maryland in 2005

The ALX200 was also popular as an export product. Citybus of Hong Kong purchased ten ALX200-bodied Volvo B6LE buses in 1997 for use on route 260 serving Stanley and Central, which were withdrawn and returned to the UK two years later due to structural defects, while 50 Alexander ALX200s were bodied on left hand drive Dennis Dart SLF chassis for use by Arriva Netherlands in 2000.

A small number of ALX200s were built by Thomas Built Buses from 1999 to 2003 under license as the 'SLF 200' for use in the United States; these buses were fitted with Cummins ISB and Mercedes-Benz engines.

== See also ==
- List of buses
