= Scania N112 =

Scania BR112/N112
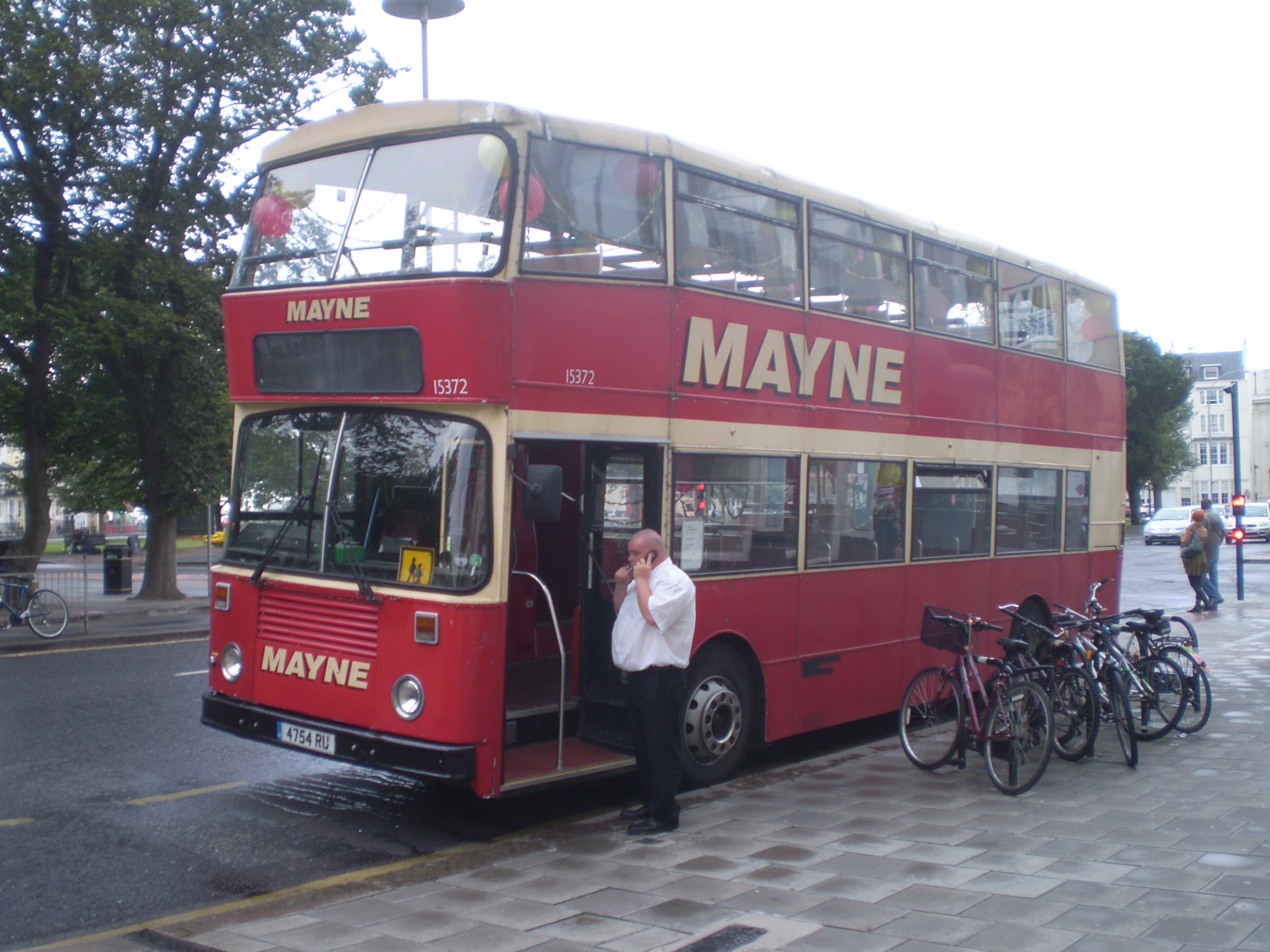
- Mayne Coaches East Lancs Droop Nose bodied Scania N112DR in July 2009

Overview
- Manufacturer: Scania
- Production: 1978–1987

Body and chassis
- Body style: Single-decker bus Double-decker bus Articulated bus
- Doors: 1-4
- Floor type: Step-entrance

Powertrain
- Engine: Scania DN11; Scania DS11
- Capacity: 11 litres (transverse engined)
- Transmission: Scania; Voith

Dimensions
- Length: 9.5m, 9.9m, 10.2m, 10.5m, 11.3m, 12.2m, 18.1m
- Width: 2.52m
- Height: 3.0m and 3.9m

Chronology
- Predecessor: Scania BR111
- Successor: Scania N113

The Scania N112 (known as the Scania BR112 until 1984) was a transversely-engined step-entrance single-decker bus, double-decker bus and articulated bus chassis manufactured by Scania between 1978 and 1987.

== BR112DH ==
In 1978, Scania ended a decade-long tie-up with Birmingham-based builder Metro Cammell Weymann (MCW) that had resulted in the Metro-Scania single-decker bus and the Metropolitan double-decker bus. MCW subsequently built its own Metrobus chassis as a replacement for the Metropolitan, while in 1980 Scania launched its own replacement, the BR112DH.

The BR112DH was available in two lengths, 9.5m and 10.2m, and was powered by the 11-litre DN11 engine (and later the turbocharged DS11 engine), coupled to either a Scania three-speed or Voith automatic gearbox.

=== United Kingdom ===
The biggest customer for the BR112DH was Newport Transport, which took 29. These included nine single-decker versions with Wadham Stringer Vanguard bodywork; the double-deckers were bodied by Marshall of Cambridge. Two were built with Alexander RH bodywork for the Tyne and Wear Passenger Transport Executive, and two more with Northern Counties bodies for the Greater Manchester Passenger Transport Executive.

There were also four demonstrators, two each with East Lancs and Marshall bodywork. One of the Marshall-bodied demonstrators was exported to the Republic of Ireland in 1981, while one of the East Lancs-bodied buses was exported to Singapore in 1982 after trials with several United Kingdom operators, joining the fleet of Singapore Bus Services as SBS7000E.

=== Australia ===
One BR112H was bodied by Custom Coaches for Neville's Bus Service in 1983.

== N112DH/N112DRB ==
In 1984, the BR112DH was re-designated the N112DH (and later N112DRB), with the same length and gearbox options. It was also available as an articulated chassis.

=== United Kingdom ===
Newport Transport initially continued to be the most significant customer, taking eight Alexander RH bodied N112s at the end of 1984, followed by eight East Lancs-bodied versions in 1986.

However, deregulation and the introduction of route tendering in London were to result in a significant increase in sales and a greater customer base, as past purchasing allegiances were broken. Former National Bus Company subsidiary Brighton & Hove took ten East Lancs-bodied N112s, while Leicester Citybus took four, and Scottish co-operative A1 Service took two. In London, Grey-Green took six East Lancs-bodied versions, while Kentish Bus bought five with Alexander RH bodies, and Boro'line Maidstone two.

There were also six East Lancs-bodied single-decker versions for Kingston upon Hull City Transport, and two for another Scottish co-operative, AA Motor Services.

The N112 was also built as an airport shuttle bus with Van Hool Alizee single-decker coach body and DAF Variomatic transmission, and in this form Capital Coaches of West Drayton ordered 23 on behalf of the British Airports Authority at Heathrow in 1987, while Terminus Securities took one in 1988 for work at Gatwick Airport.

=== Australia ===
In 1987, Centurion bodied a N112 for Kangaroo Flat Bus Lines, Bendigo, while Custom Coaches bodied one for Neville's Bus Service. In 1987/88, Ansair bodied twelve for Metro Tasmania.

One articulated N112ARS was bodied by Denning in 1985 for the Brisbane City Council followed In 1993 by a Volgren bodied example for Invicta Bus Services.

== Replacement ==
In 1988, Scania introduced its 3-series range of buses and trucks, and the N112 was thus replaced by the new N113.
