= MCW Metrobus =

Two and three-axle double-decker bus

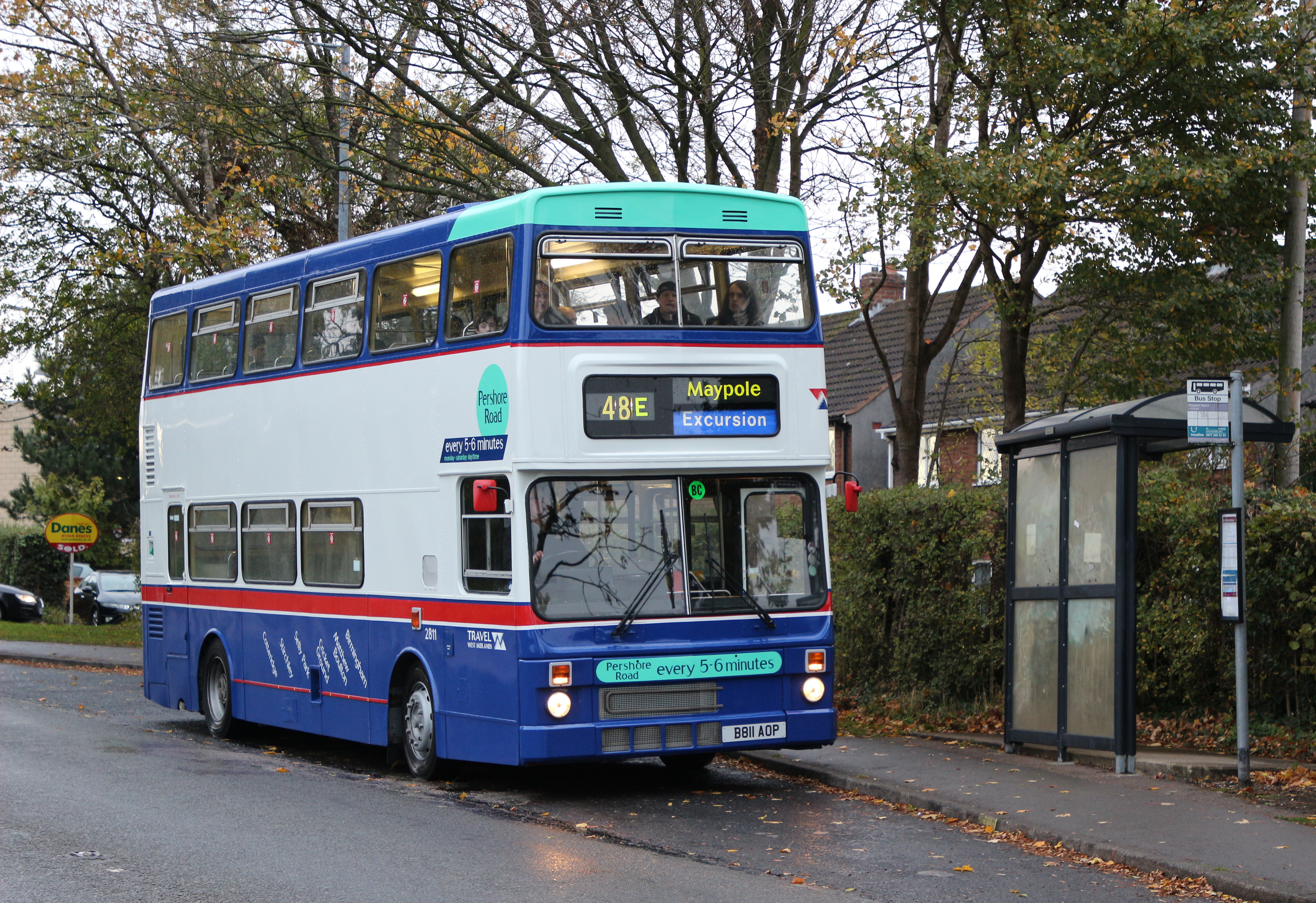
- Preserved Travel West Midlands MCW Metrobus MkII at the Wythall Transport Museum in October 2018

Overview
- Manufacturer: Metro Cammell Weymann
- Production: 1977–1989
- Assembly: Washwood Heath, Birmingham, England

Body and chassis
- Class: Double-decker bus
- Doors: 1, 2 or 3
- Floor type: Step entrance

Powertrain
- Engine: Gardner 6LXB; Gardner 6LXCT; Gardner 6LXDT; Rolls-Royce Eagle 220 Mk III; Cummins LT10; Cummins LTA10-B282
- Transmission: Voith DIWA851; Voith DIWA851.2; Voith DIWA854; Voith DIWA864G; Maxwell

Dimensions
- Length: 9.7 m (31 ft 10 in); 11.0 m (36 ft 1 in); 11.3 m (37 ft 1 in); 12.0 m (39 ft 4 in)
- Width: 2.5 m (8 ft 2 in)
- Height: 4.38 m (14 ft 4 in) (Standard height)

Chronology
- Predecessor: Scania Metropolitan
- Successor: Optare Spectra

Metrobus badge

The MCW Metrobus is a two and three-axle double-decker bus manufactured by Metro Cammell Weymann (MCW) between 1977 and 1989. The Metrobus was conceived as a semi-integral product manufactured completely by MCW in both MkI and MkII variants, but Alexander and Northern Counties also bodied some examples.

== Design ==
=== MkI ===
Launched in January 1977 with the first five prototypes delivered to local passenger transport executive operator West Midlands PTE, the MCW Metrobus was conceived by Metro Cammell Weymann as a successor to the integrally-bodied Scania Metropolitan, which MCW partnered with Scania AB to manufacture the bodywork for.

Compared to the Metropolitan body, the body of the MCW Metrobus was built to line up with chassis outriggers, with the engine additionally mounted on top of the rear engine bay as opposed being bolted to the chassis. The floor of the Metrobus was mounted directly on the chassis, creating an almost step-free lower-deck that removed the need for a drop-centre rear axle. Metrobuses were produced as standard to 9.7 metres (31 ft 10 in) length, however a 11.0 metres (36 ft 1 in) length was provisionally offered at launch for a single-deck Metrobus, and featured a two-piece front windscreen with a deeper nearside pane, a featured carried over from the earlier Metropolitan and Metro-Scania designs.

Metrobuses were equipped with air suspension as standard as well as an experimental cooling system: one half of the system ran through the engine to a heat exchanger, returning cool air to the engine, and the other half ran from the heat exchanger to a front-mounted radiator via internal heaters on both decks. Upon launch, Metrobuses could be specified with either Gardner 6LXB engines mated to Voith DIWA851 automatic transmissions or Rolls-Royce Eagle 220 Mk III mated to GKN SRM automatic transmissions, however by the end of 1978, this plan had been shelved by MCW, with further Voith variants offered instead and the Maxwell transmissions being made available for the Metrobus from 1981 onwards.

=== MkII ===
In 1982, MCW superseded their original Metrobus design by launching the MkII Metrobus, designed to be cheaper to manufacture and operate through having different aluminium extrusions, three types of fixing brackets and common body and roof panels, resulting in a 60% reduction of individual bodywork components. Most notable of these component changes was a revised front end, including a symmetrical two-piece windscreen with an arched top, and the removal of most grille badging. Despite the introduction of the MkII design, production of the original MkI continued exclusively for the Greater Manchester Passenger Transport Executive and London Regional Transport until 1983 and 1985 respectively.

MCW also introduced a tri-axle variant of the Metrobus MkII, marketed as the 'Super Metrobus', for export markets such as Hong Kong. These were built to 12.0 metres (39 ft 4 in) length and had a passenger capacity of 158, including 124 seated passengers.

Production of the Metrobus ceased in 1989 with the financial collapse of Metro Cammell Weymann. The final two customers of the Metrobus, Strathclyde Buses and West Midlands Travel, saw the delivery of their buses held back as they sought assurances from MCW that their buses would be covered with two-year warranties and parts support following the dissolution of the manufacturer. Following initial interest from Plaxton in only the Metrobus body and not the chassis, the design rights to the MCW Metrobus design were purchased by a Optare-DAF Bus joint venture in October 1989. The two companies heavily reworked the Metrobus design to produce a new vehicle, the DAF DB250 based Optare Spectra, which was launched in 1991 using the same rear frame configuration, rear axle and rear suspension system as the Metrobus.

== Operators ==
=== United Kingdom ===
==== London Transport ====
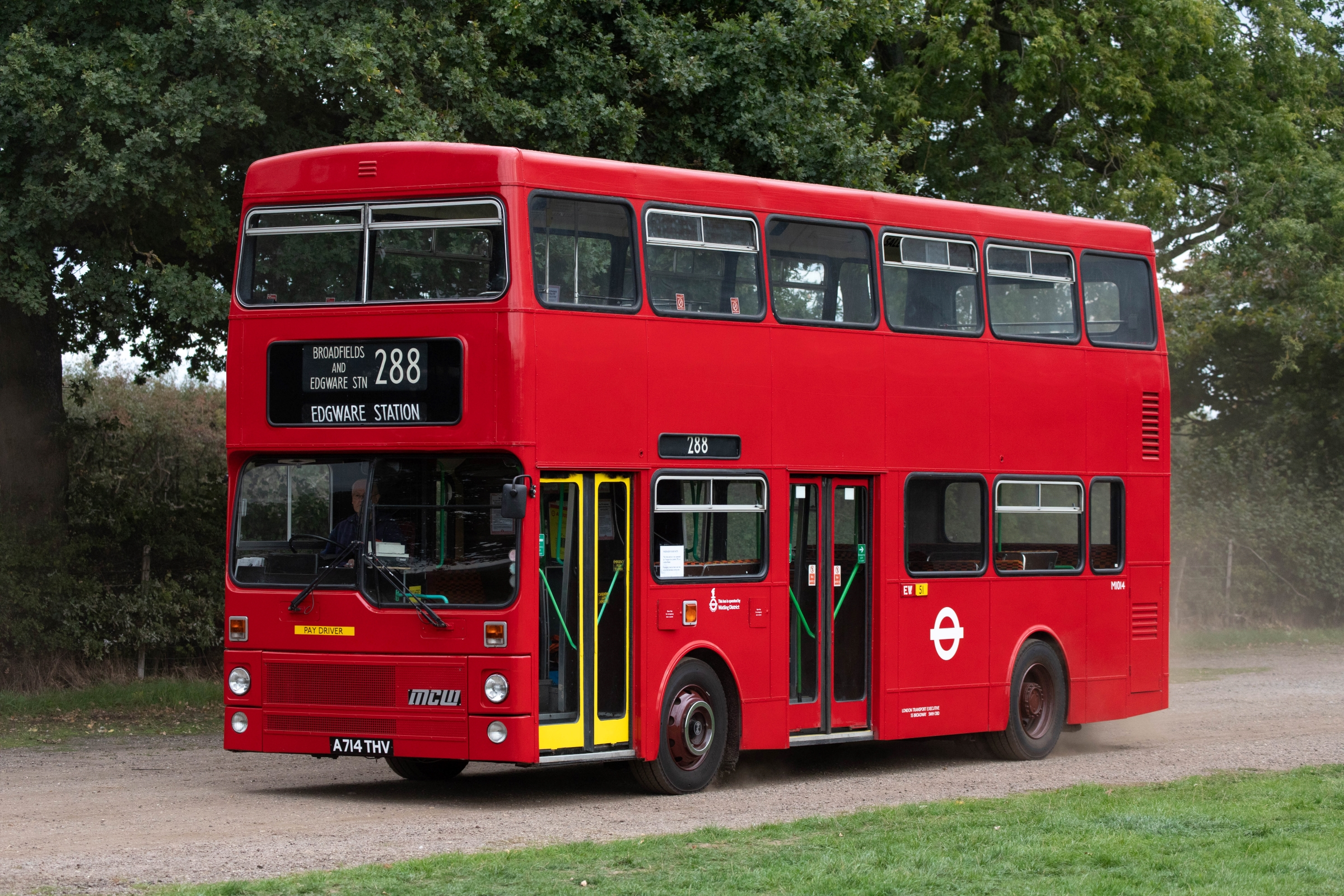
Preserved London Transport Metrobus MkI at Showbus 2022 in St Albans

The London Transport Executive purchased 1,440 MkI examples between 1978 and 1985, numbering them M1 to M1440. Two MkII prototypes were delivered to London Transport for the Alternative Vehicle Evaluation programme in 1984, M1441 with a Gardner engine and Voith transmission and M1442 with a Cummins engine and Maxwell transmission, however no orders resulted.

Between 1987 and 1988, due to a vehicle shortage, fourteen Metrobuses were purchased secondhand by London Regional Transport (LRT) from the Greater Manchester Passenger Transport Executive, the West Yorkshire Passenger Transport Executive and Busways Travel and allocated to Potters Bar garage. LRT low-cost subsidiary Harrow Buses leased 29 new MkII Metrobuses in 1987, but returned them to their lessor three years later. LRT's Metrobuses were the mainstay of the double decker fleet between 1987 and the privatisation in 1994, when most of them passed to seven of LRT's new business units:

- MTL purchased the London Northern and it's 179 Metrobuses. It acquired more when it took over London Suburban Buses, also incorporating some ex-London examples from its Merseyside operations. When MTL London's operations were purchased by Metroline, this Metrobus fleet dwindled during 2002, with Ms replaced by low-floor buses on most routes. Some were retained through 2003 to deputise on AEC Routemaster routes, but operation on TfL services ceased in July 2004, the final three examples based at Potters Bar garage being the last Metrobuses in regular London service at the time.
- London General withdrew its last Metrobuses in normal service at Stockwell Garage in February 2003, leaving a handful of Metrobuses for special purposes; M1440 and open-top OM171 from the private hire fleet at Sutton and M1435, painted into a "spotted cow" livery for an art exhibition. Some were also retained by London General as driver trainers.
- First CentreWest, First Capital and London United also reached the end with Metrobuses in normal service in 2003. Arriva London also continued using Metrobuses until these were finally displaced in 2002/03; however Arriva operated the final Metrobus in London service (M1332) on the 121 in January 2006.

==== West Midlands ====
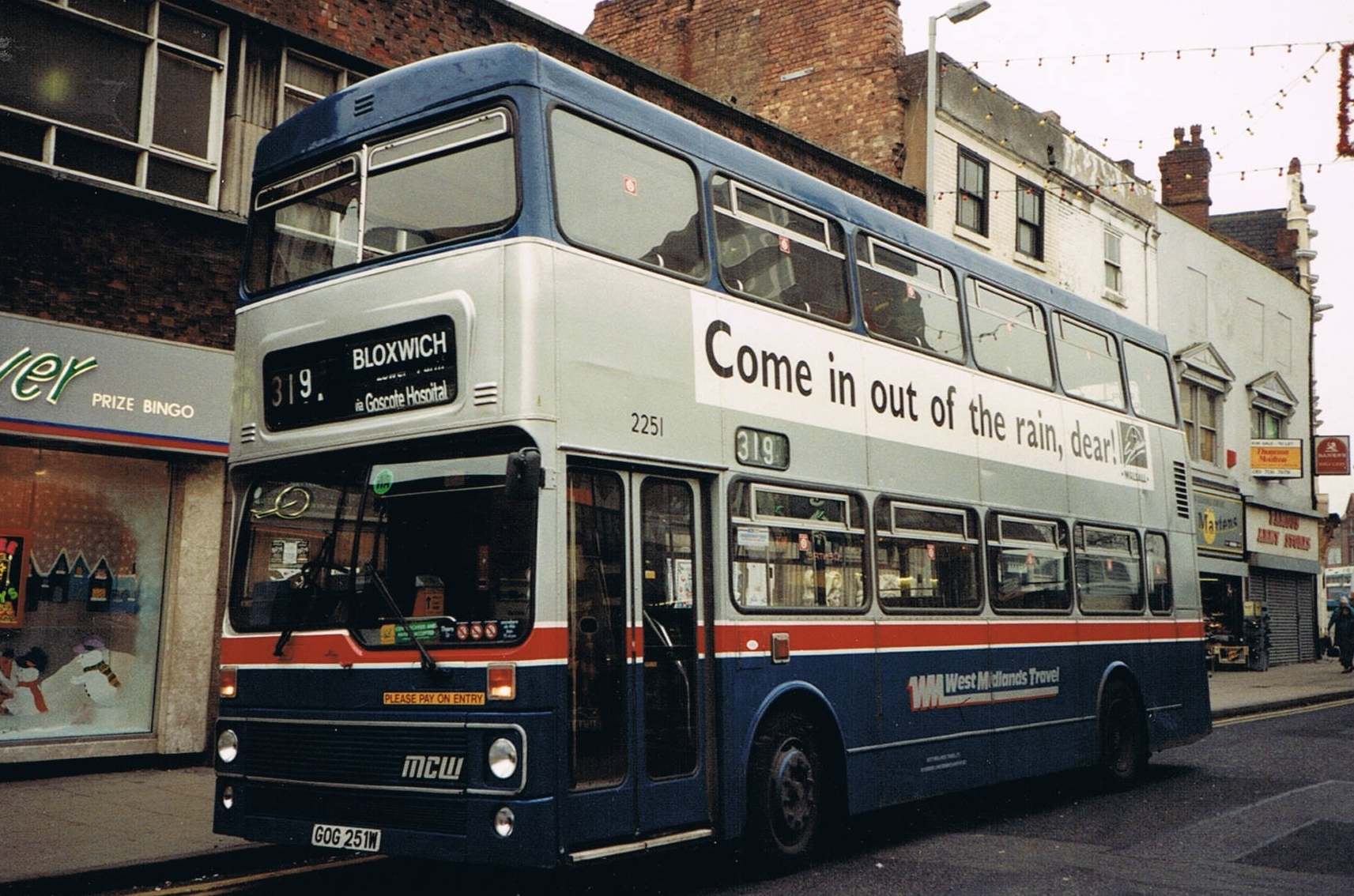
West Midlands Travel Metrobuses MkI in Walsall

The West Midlands Passenger Transport Executive (WMPTE) and its successor, West Midlands Travel (WMT), also purchased significant numbers of Metrobuses, with over 1,100 MkI and MkII examples acquired between 1978 and 1989. The first order for five was placed upon the launch of the Metrobus in January 1977, with the first delivered in January 1978.

Fourteen Metrobus MkIIs were delivered to WMPTE equipped with guide wheels, flipdot displays and a black and silver livery for use on the Tracline 65 service in 1984, the first guided busway system in the United Kingdom. Fifty dual-purpose Metrobuses with high-backed seats were also delivered to the PTE in 1986, branded for use on 'Timesaver' express services.

In early 1995, West Midlands Travel's aging Metrobus fleet was suffering from severe corrosion, resulting in bus body manufacturer Marshall Bus of Cambridge being contracted to overhaul all of WMT's Metrobuses. A production line costing £240,000 (equivalent to £493,000 in 2025) overall was established in one of Marshall Bus' aircraft hangars and by early 1996, Marshall was completing five Metrobus overhauls per week. The catalogue of refurbishments made by Marshall Bus included replacement of damaged or corroded panels, new outriggers, flitch plates, crossmembers, sills, a new bulkhead and new stainless steel riser panels. Stress panels were also installed around the wheel arches and around the lower-deck interior, the floors on both decks were replaced, and a smaller rear window was installed alongside revised rear panelling. The refurbishments were aimed at making the buses capable of an extra ten years of service; however, no refurbished powertrains were included in the Metrobus overhauls. Over 600 Metrobuses, mainly MkIIs, were overhauled until the contract was terminated a year early in 1999, due to a lack of confidence in Marshall Bus over delays to the programme.

The last Metrobuses were withdrawn from regular service in March 2010, being relegated to school services prior to their final withdrawal on 24 July 2010 at Acocks Green garage. A small number were retained in the company's driver training fleet until 2017, however, and one was purchased and restored by Wolverhampton garage staff into 'Timesaver' livery in 2017.

==== Other PTEs ====
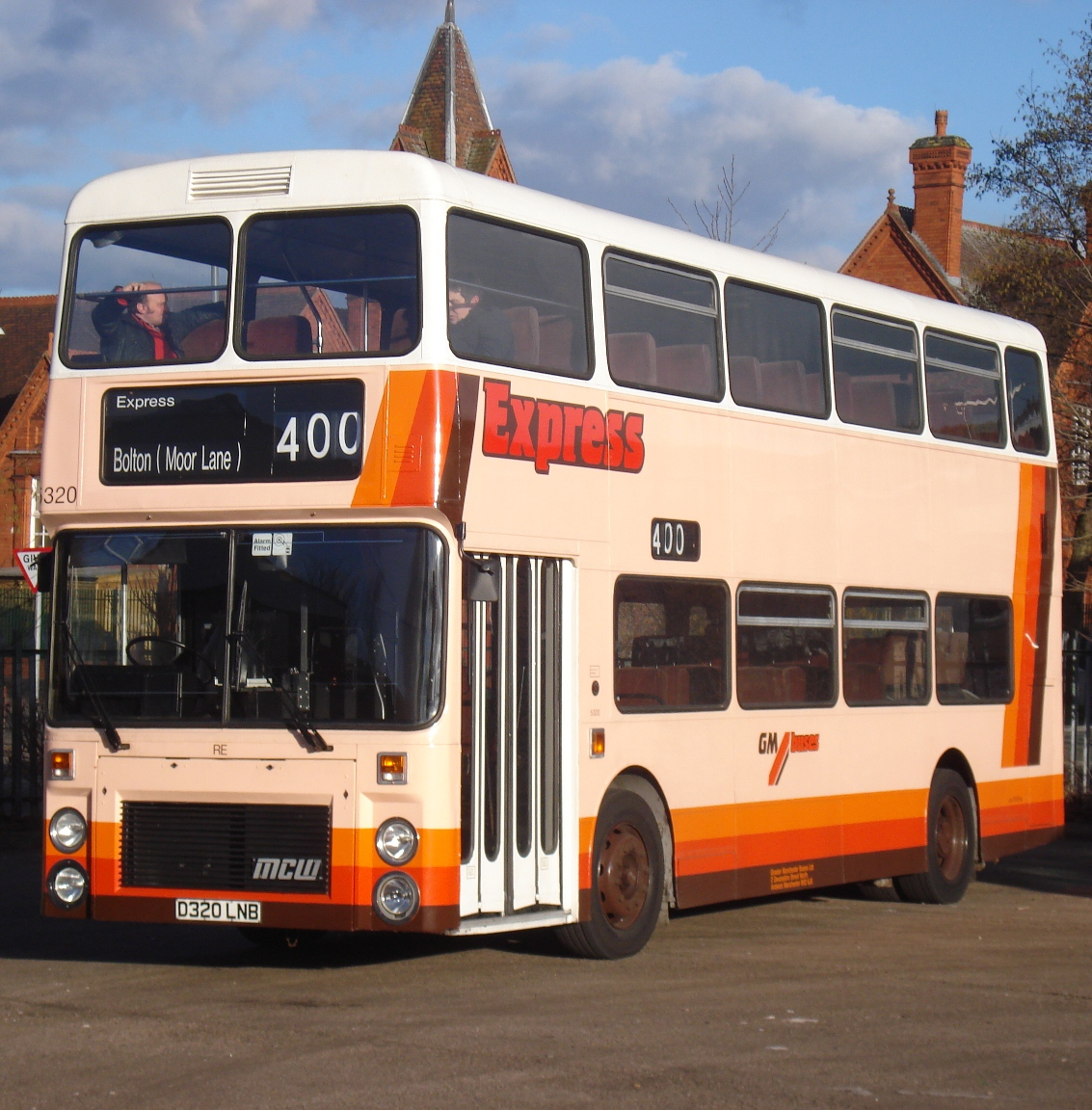
Preserved GM Buses Express Northern Counties bodied Metrobus in Aston, Birmingham in March 2010

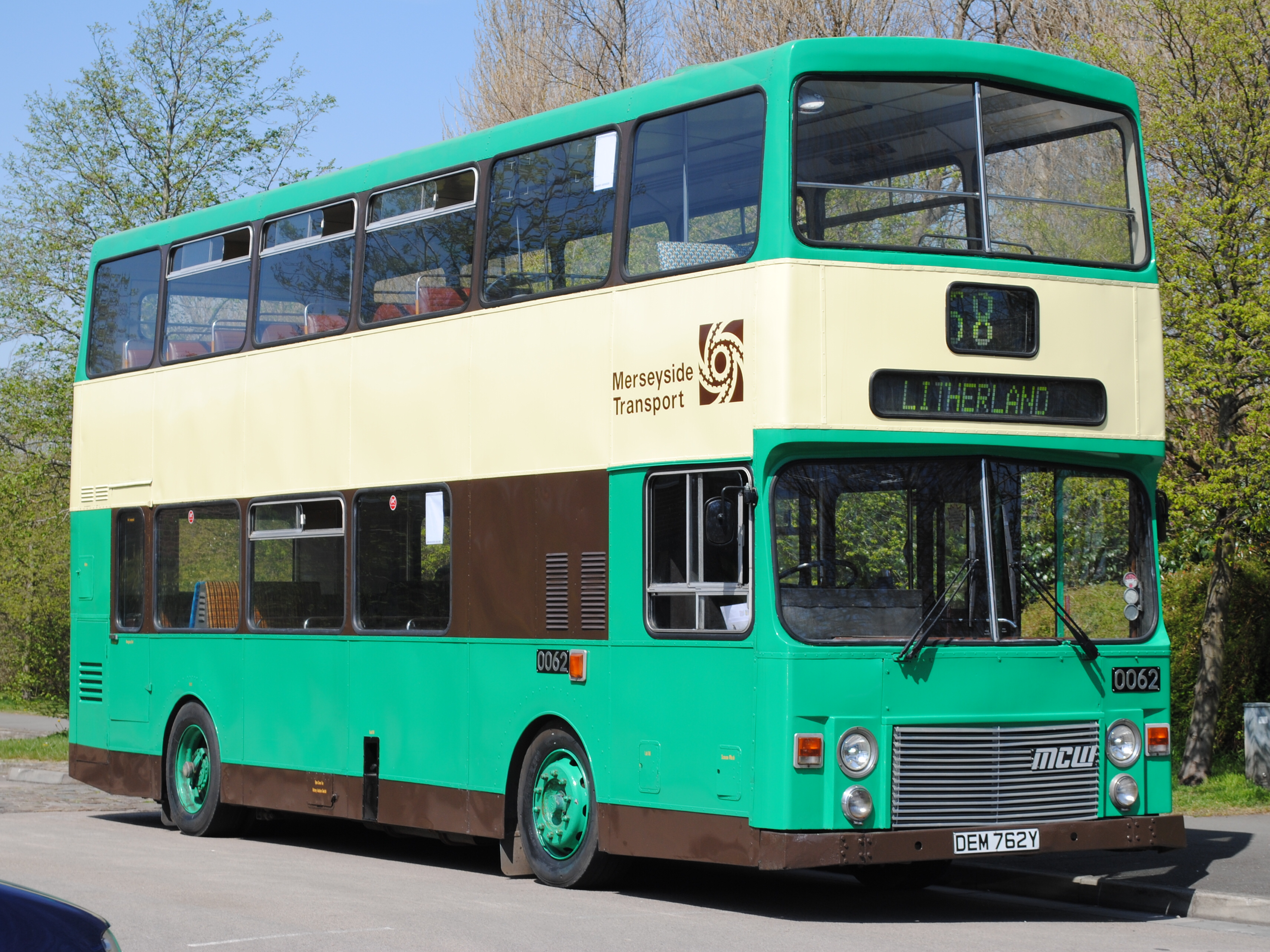
Preserved Merseyside Passenger Transport Executive Alexander bodied Metrobus in Ford, Sefton in May 2013

The Greater Manchester Passenger Transport Executive (GMPTE) initially ordered 190 MkI MCW Metrobuses which were delivered between 1979 and 1983, alongside an unfulfilled order of 15 out of 190 Leyland Titans. During 1986, Northern Counties delivered 30 more MCW Metrobuses built with Manchester standard bodywork, intended for the 'Trans Lancs' 400 express service linking Bolton with Stockport.

The West Yorkshire Passenger Transport Executive and its successor Yorkshire Rider purchased over 100 Metrobuses, a majority of these being MkIIs and eleven being bodied with Alexander bodywork. One MkII Metrobus was converted by Yorkshire Rider to operate as a demonstrator for a guided busway in Leeds, using parts supplied from WMT's Tracline 65 Metrobuses.

The South Yorkshire Passenger Transport Executive purchased a total of 170 MkI and MkII Metrobuses following comparative trials in 1979, delivered across five batches from 1980 to 1985, some being specified in dual doors configuration. These were joined by ten MkII Metrobuses in 1986 that were delivered with coach-style seats for 'Fastline' express work.

The Tyne and Wear Passenger Transport Executive bought five Metrobuses on evaluation in 1979, selling these to LRT in 1988, while fifteen Metrobuses, some with Alexander bodywork, were purchased by the Merseyside Passenger Transport Executive; the PTE's successor Merseybus went on to purchase 25 Metrobus MKIIs in 1989.

The Greater Glasgow Passenger Transport Executive and its successor, Strathclyde Buses, purchased 70 MkI, MkII and Alexander-bodied Metrobuses over from 1979 to the end of production in 1989.

==== Other operators ====
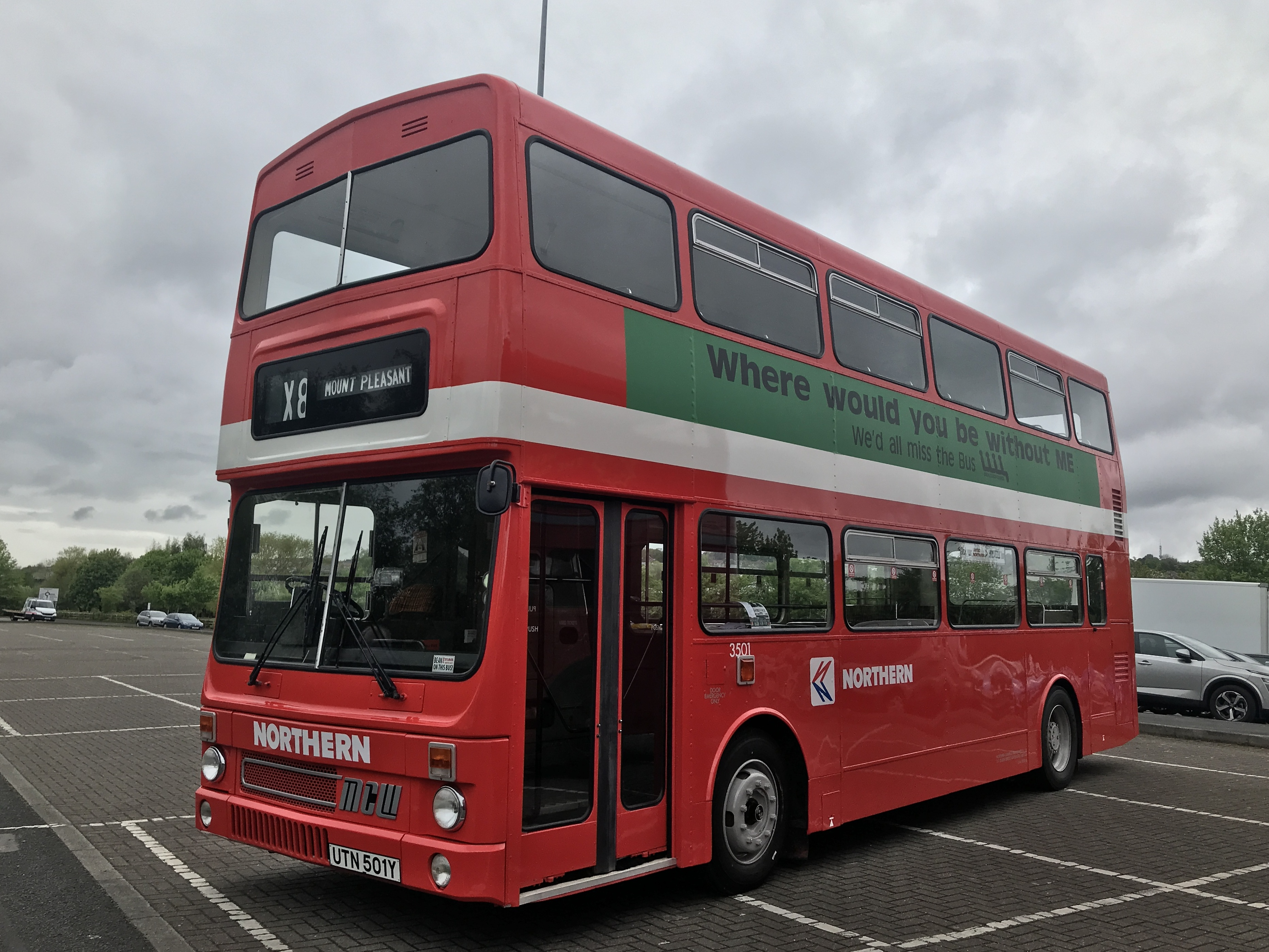
Preserved NBC Northern General Metrobus MkII at the 2024 MetroCentre bus rally

The Metrobus also found sales to National Bus Company subsidiaries Maidstone & District and Northern General, with the former ordering two pairs of MkI Metrobuses with MCW and Rolls-Royce engines as part of comparative trials held by the NBC in 1980. Yorkshire Traction took delivery of twelve Metrobuses in late 1986, an order initially placed when the company was an NBC subsidiary. These Metrobuses were unique in that they were built to a low height specification.

Metrobuses with Alexander bodywork proved popular with the Scottish Bus Group, with Midland Scottish taking on a total of 109 by 1986. Most of these were transferred to Kelvin Scottish following the reorganisation of the SBG. Tayside Regional Council's bus operations, meanwhile, took delivery of a single Metrobus in 1979 for comparative trials against Volvo and Dennis vehicles in Dundee.

Other municipal bus operators who bought Metrobuses included Kingston upon Hull City Transport, Leicester City Transport, Newport Transport and Reading Transport.

=== Hong Kong ===
==== Early introductions ====
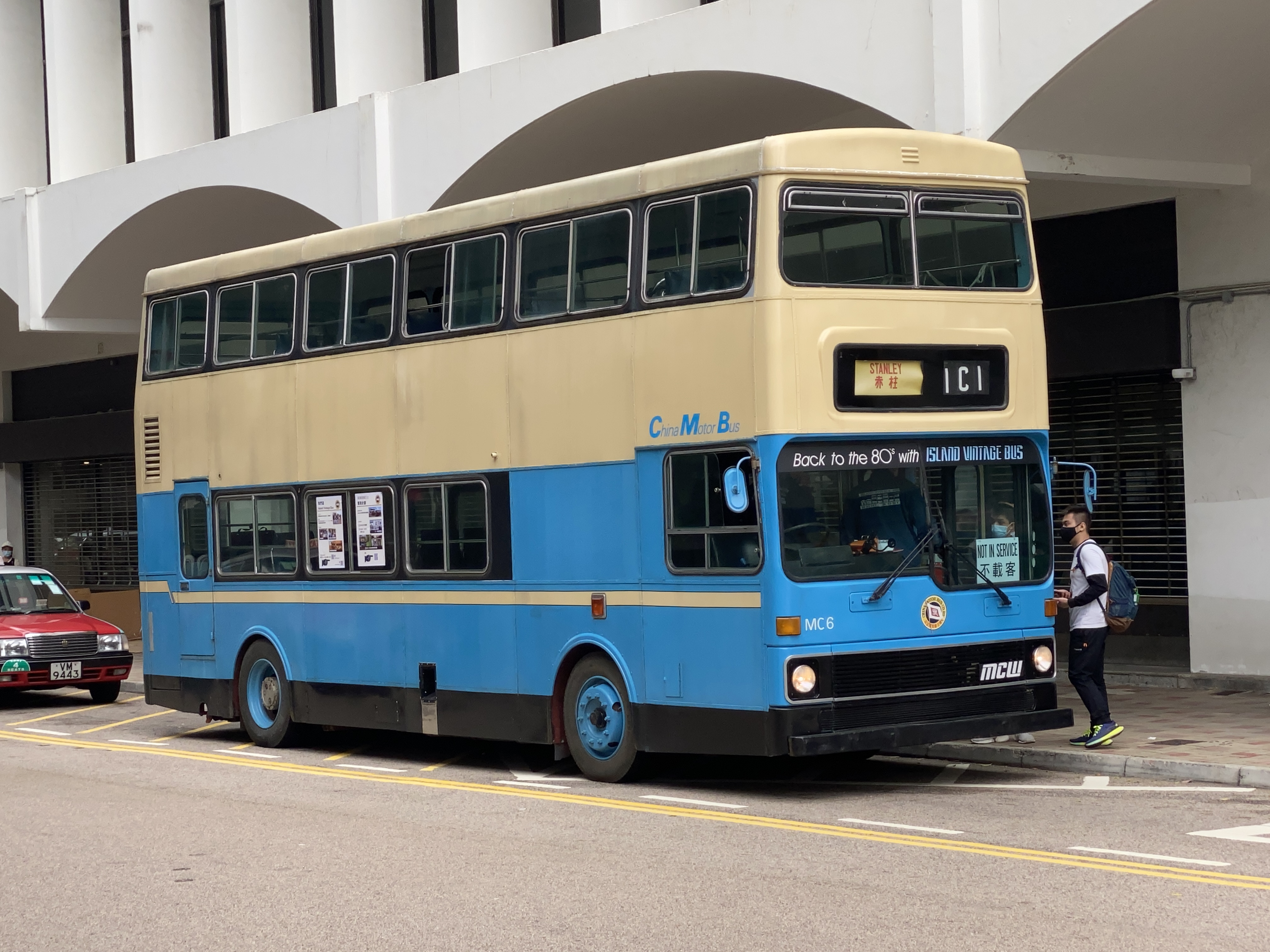
Preserved China Motor Bus Metrobus MkI at the General Post Office, Hong Kong in January 2022

In Hong Kong, China Motor Bus (CMB) introduced 12 Metrobuses (MC1-MC12) in 1978 for its luxury coach services (which covered the routes between Repulse Bay, Stanley and the Central District). Within a year, MCW produced an 11-metre 2-axle version of Metrobus. Only 40 were produced for CMB in 1978/79, where they would be classified as MB1-MB40. They were used mostly on express and cross-harbour services. Both batches of CMB Metrobuses had MkI bodies.

==== 1980s ====
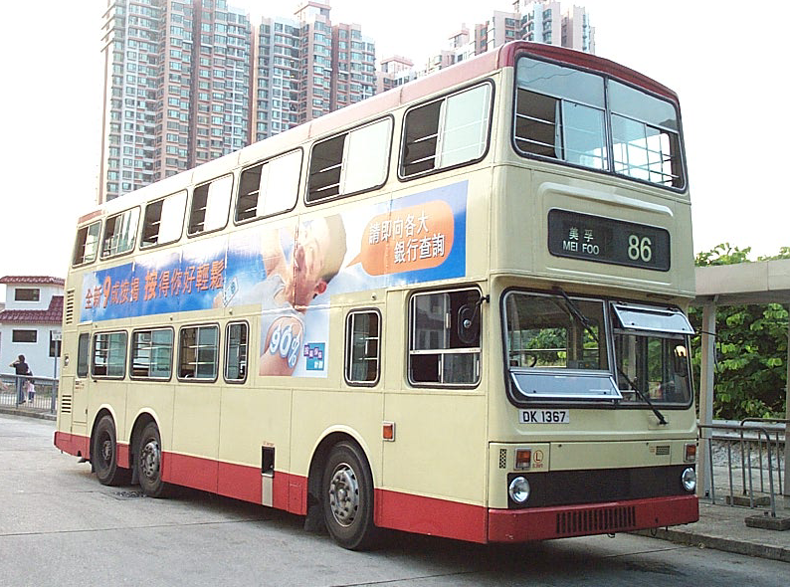
Kowloon Motor Bus 3-axle Metrobus MkII in Wong Nai Tau

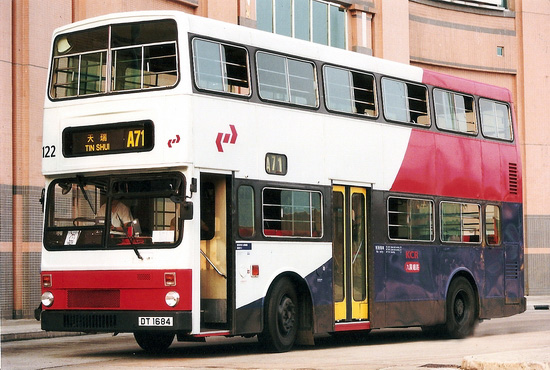
Kowloon-Canton Railway Corporation MCW Metrobus in June 2006

In 1981, MCW produced prototypes of 3-axle, 12-metre long "Super-Metrobuses". Two were purchased by CMB as ML1-ML2 and three by Kowloon Motor Bus (KMB) as M1-M3, later renumbered 3M1-3M3. All were bodied with MCW MkII bodies. CMB purchased a further 82 (ML3-84) between 1983 and 1988, while KMB purchased 80 2-axle Metrobuses (M1-M80, with MkII bodies) between 1983 and 1985.

While KMB was not interested in the 12-metre version Super-Metrobuses, they did express their interest in an 11-metre 3-axle version (the CMB 11-metre version Metrobuses were 2-axle) with 254 11-metre 3-axle Metrobuses (S3M1-254) purchased between 1986 and 1989. Fifty of these buses were fitted with Cummins engines, and another one (later numbered S3M145) was originally fitted with a prototype Sutrak air-conditioning system on delivery in 1987, but this proved unreliable and was subsequently removed a year later.

Between 1987 and 1989, Kowloon-Canton Railway Corporation (KCRC) also purchased 59 2-axle Metrobuses for their feeder bus services. 39 of them (101-139) were brand new with MkII bodies, while another 20 (140-159) were second-hand buses purchased from South Yorkshire PTE with MkI bodies, some of them with dual-doors.

Argos Bus purchased 6 Metrobuses for their non-franchised routes and private hire services between 1988 and 1989. They were from the same batch as those bought second-hand by KCRC.

KMB purchased eight further 2-axle Metrobuses (M81-M88) in 1989. These buses were fitted with Cummins LTA10-B282 (282 hp) engines and Voith D864G 4-speed gearbox, and were used on the hilly KMB Route 51 (between Tsuen Wan and Kam Tin, climbing Tai Mo Shan along its way). Later, KMB fitted some of its older Metrobuses with Cummins engines, in order to avoid excess damage to buses running the hilly route.

==== Withdrawal ====
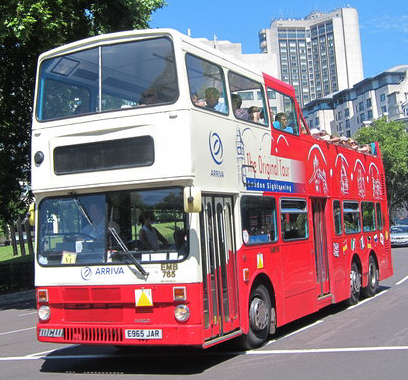
The Original Tour MCW Super Metrobus 12 m MkII in London in June 2011

The MkI second-hand Metrobuses were the first to be withdrawn, and all of them have since been scrapped. Many of the KCRC Metrobuses were loaned to Citybus for few years before final withdrawal.

CMB removed its MC-class Metrobuses from the luxury routes after introducing Dennis Darts for the service in 1991, preserving the seating layout. These Metrobuses were allocated to non-luxury routes in the Southern District, Hong Kong, as well as route 13 serving the "Mid-levels". Although CMB was the first to introduce Metrobuses, it withdrew only 3 of them (all were accident victims) before the end of its franchise in August 1998. Its earliest Metrobuses were 20 years old at that time. New World First Bus purchased all the remaining CMB Metrobuses and Super-Metrobuses when it took over most of the CMB routes, and converted 3 MC-class Metrobuses to training buses. In 2000, the last of the MCW Metrobuses were de-registered, briefly exported to The Original Tour, Big Bus Tours or to Australia. Some of the MCW Metrobuses were brought back to The Original Tour in the year 2006. As of 2013, the last of the examples from United Kingdom were withdrawn.

KMB allocated its 3 Super-Metrobuses to the New Territories for many years. For example, they were serving on route 61A (which connected Tuen Mun and Yuen Long new towns) right before the KCR Light Rail took over the services. After that, they were seen on route 36A (which connected a public housing estate in Kwai Chung to a ferry pier) until the route's decline in the mid-1990s. They spent a few further years as spare buses before being withdrawn from passenger service in 1996 and converted to training buses. They were finally sold and scrapped in 2001.

KMB started to withdraw its 2-axle Metrobuses in 1997. Some of them had their chassis damaged due to the fatigue caused during their service on the Tai Mo Shan KMB Route 51, which climbed to the highest altitude achievable by buses in Hong Kong. These were withdrawn by 2003. The 11-metre 3-axle Metrobuses in KMB were not withdrawn until summer 2002. KCRC also started to withdraw their Mark II Metrobuses in the early 2000s. The last 2-axle Metrobus in Hong Kong (KCRC 134) was withdrawn in October 2005.

The last Metrobus in Hong Kong (fleet number S3M233, license no. EH8559) ceased operation on 8 May 2007. As of mid-2011, no more Metrobuses were licensed and in use in Hong Kong.

== See also ==
- List of buses
