= Scania Metropolitan =

Scania-MCW double deck bus, produced 1973-1978

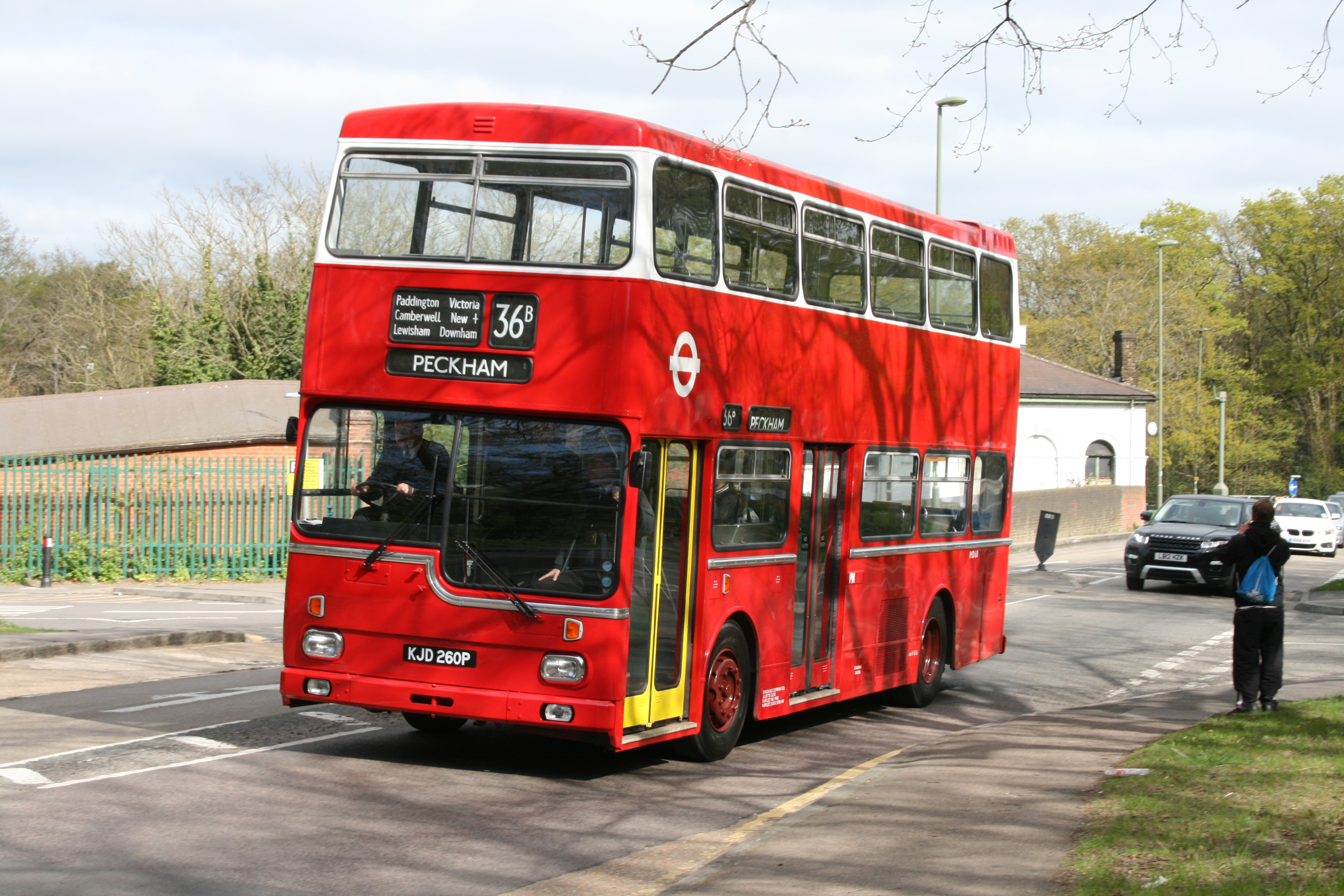
- Preserved former London Transport Scania Metropolitan in April 2015

Overview
- Manufacturer: MCW
- Production: 1973-1978

Body and chassis
- Doors: 1-2
- Floor type: Step entrance
- Chassis: Scania BR111DH

Powertrain
- Engine: Scania D11

Dimensions
- Length: 31 ft 10 in (9.7 m)

The Scania Metropolitan was the first double decker bus model built jointly by MCW and Scania. It was built between 1973 and 1978.

It was the second bus model jointly built by these two companies. The first model was the Metro-Scania single decker based on the BR110/CR110 chassis, which was the first Scania bus built for the United Kingdom market in 1969 and sold in small numbers.

== Construction ==
The Metropolitan was the double deck equivalent of the Metro-Scania. It was based on Scania BR111DH chassis and the body was constructed by MCW, who claimed it to be built with 70% British content. The distinguishing feature is the asymmetric windscreen being deeper on the nearside to give the driver an improved view of the kerb, a feature which was carried over to the MCW Metrobus. It was noted for its performance from the turbocharged Scania engine when compared to the earlier Gardner and Leyland diesel engine used in many buses of the time, its smooth and quiet ride due to air suspension, and high fuel consumption, particularly an issue for operators when the price of fuel rose during the 1973 oil crisis. However, severe body corrosion and mechanical problems led these buses to have a short life in service.

== Operators ==
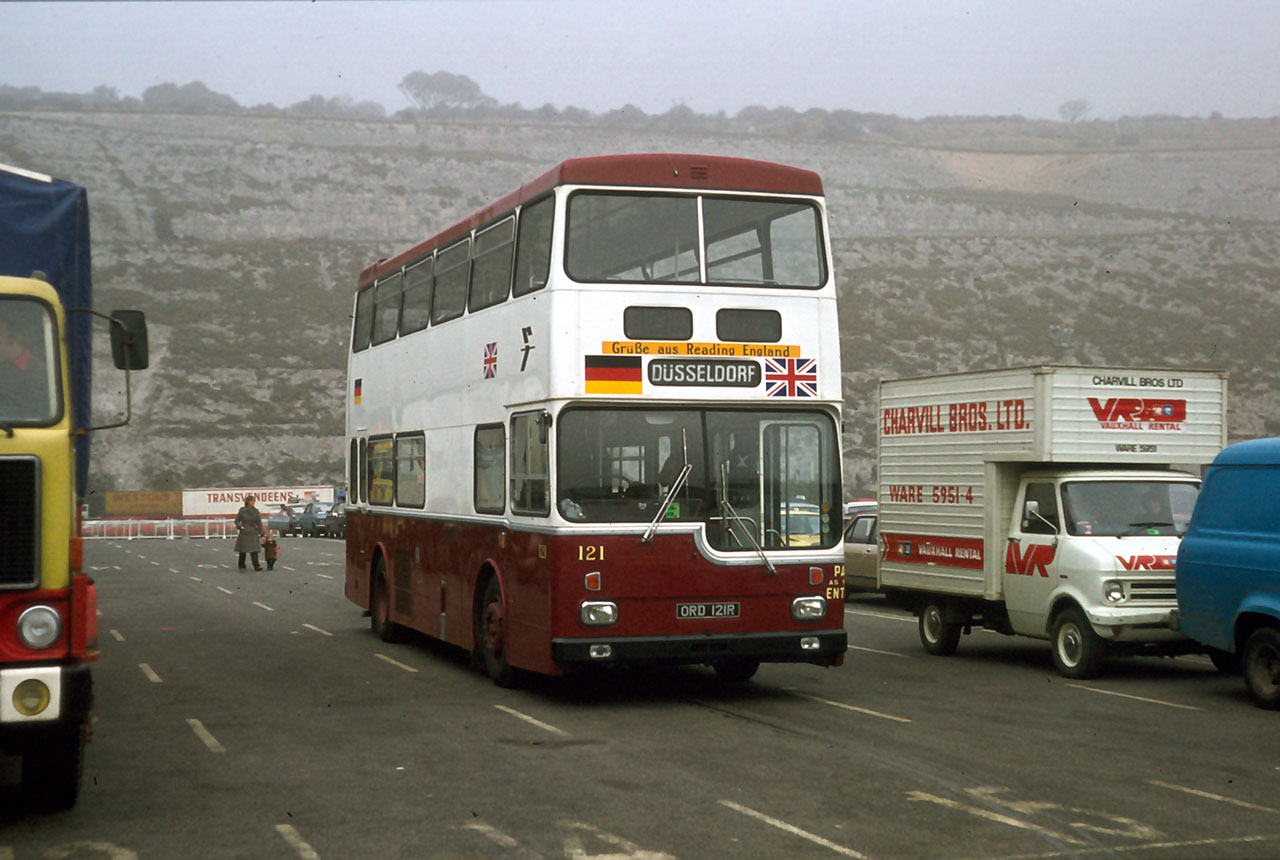
Reading Transport Scania Metropolitan at Dover Eastern Docks to visit Reading's twin town of Düsseldorf in April 1978

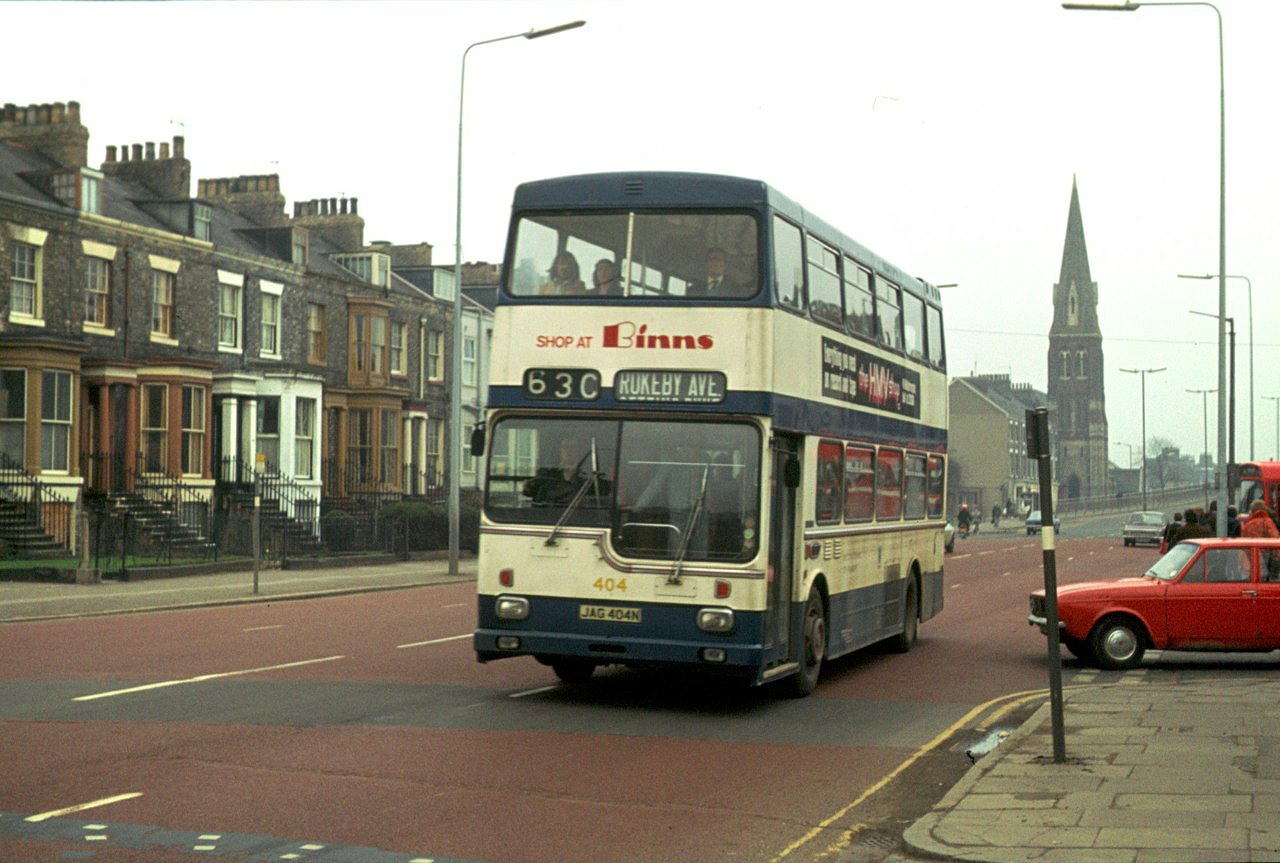
Kingston upon Hull City Transport Scania Metropolitan in April 1979

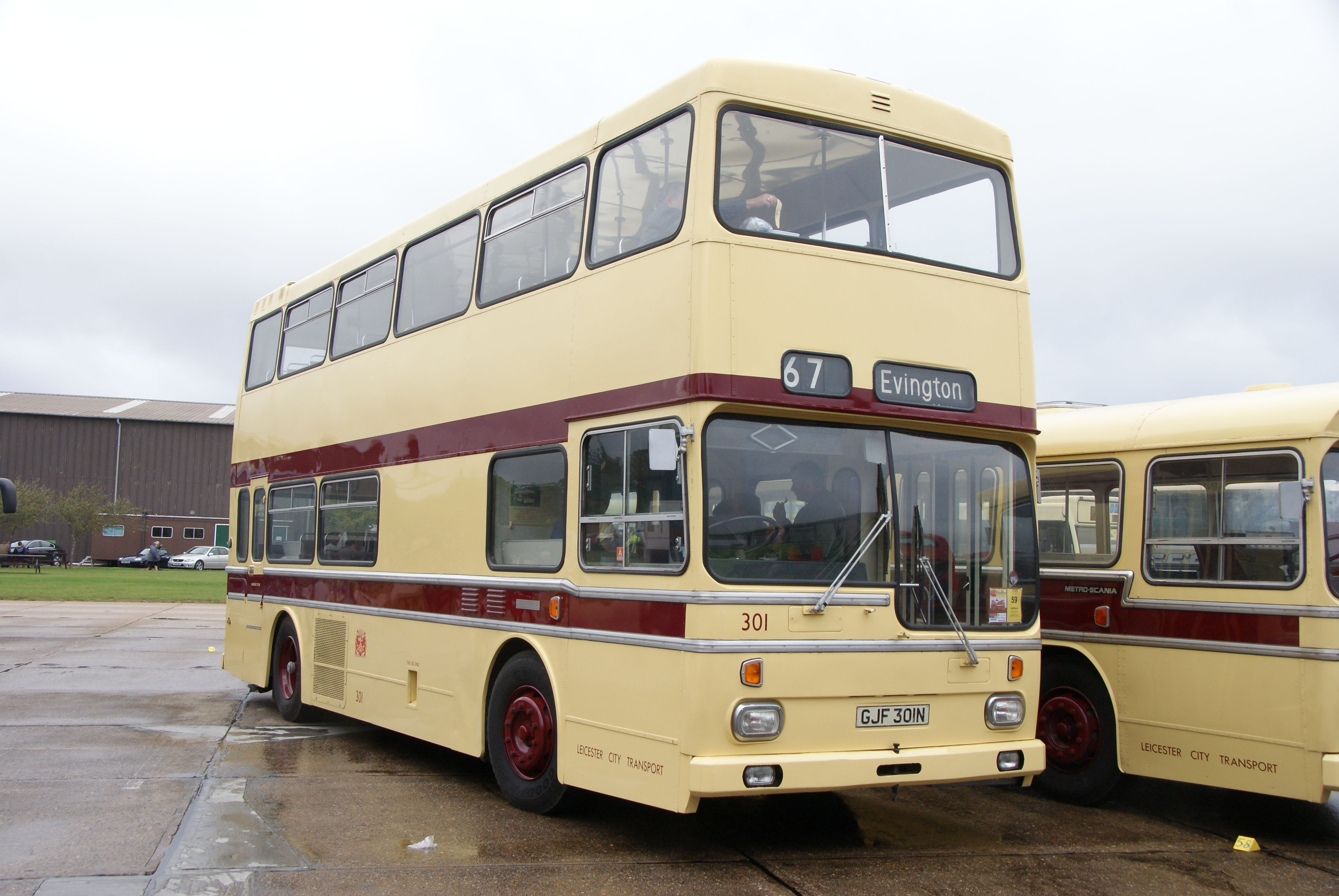
Preserved Leicester City Transport Scania Metropolitan in Duxford in September 2010

London Transport was the largest operator of Scania Metropolitans, with 164 being delivered between 1975 and 1977. The Metropolitans were allocated to garages in South East London, later known as the Selkent operating district, but were all put up for sale in 1982 as part of wide-ranging cuts to London Transport bus services. Some continued in service with other operators for several years, including Reading Transport, Whippet Coaches, Charles Cook of Biggleswade, Black Prince Buses of Morley, Alec Head of Lutton and Camms of Nottingham.

Outside London, the Scania Metropolitan was popular with four out of five of the United Kingdom's passenger transport executives. However, they lived short lives with these operators due to reliability and fuel cost issues and were mostly withdrawn prior to bus deregulation in 1986. The Tyne & Wear Passenger Transport Executive were the second-largest operator of Metropolitans, purchasing 140 of the type from 1975 to 1977. Most of these Metropolitans were withdrawn and sold for scrap due to corrosion issues, although a handful passed to the PTE's successor Busways Travel Services.

Other large orders for the Metropolitan from the passenger transport executives included the West Yorkshire Passenger Transport Executive, who purchased 95 Metropolitans between 1975 and 1977, the Merseyside Passenger Transport Executive, who purchased 60 in the mid-1970s after taking delivery of 20 Metro-Scanias between 1972 and 1973, and the Greater Glasgow Passenger Transport Executive, who purchased 40 Metropolitans in 1975. Smaller orders were delivered to Greater Manchester PTE, who purchased 10 Metropolitans in 1974 for use on the Trans-Lancs Express service 400 connecting Bolton to Stockport, and South Yorkshire PTE, who purchased four Metropolitans in 1975, which were sold in 1980 due to reliability issues and high operating costs.

The Scania Metropolitan was also popular with municipally owned bus companies across the United Kingdom. Leicester City Transport was the largest of these, purchasing 68 Metropolitans in several batches between 1974 and 1977 to operate alongside their 35 single-deck Metro-Scanias, with all but a final batch of five Metropolitans in 1977 being delivered in dual-door configuration. Reading Transport, meanwhile, took 33 Metropolitans from 1975 to 1978, adding to these second-hand examples from the London Transport and Tyne & Wear Transport fleets, Kingston upon Hull City Transport took 30 Metropolitans from 1975 to 1978, later adding second-hand Metropolitans from Merseyside Transport to their fleet, and Newport Transport bought 10 Metropolitans in 1975, which were withdrawn from service in 1985.

The only Scania Metropolitans to be purchased by a subsidiary of the National Bus Company were purchased by Maidstone & District Motor Services in 1975, with five delivered for comparative trials alongside Bristol VRTs and Volvo Ailsa B55s. When trials began in 1976, these Metropolitans were based at Hastings before being onto Chatham in 1977, and despite proving popular with both Maidstone & District staff and passengers, proved more expensive to run compared to the Bristol and Volvo buses, and would be withdrawn by 1983.

China Motor Bus of Hong Kong were the only bus operator outside the United Kingdom to purchase Metropolitans, taking delivery of two examples in 1975, which were withdrawn in the late 1980s.

== End of production ==
Production of the Scania Metropolitan ceased in 1978, with the last examples going to Reading Transport, with two built to dual-purpose specifications with high speed rear axles to operate the express X1 service to London. A total of 661 Metropolitans were built. MCW launched the Metrobus in 1977, and Scania launched the BR112DH chassis in 1980 as the replacement of the BR111DH.

== See also ==
- List of buses
