= Route 51 (disambiguation) =

Route 51 may refer to:

- Route 51 (MTA Maryland), a bus route in Baltimore, Maryland and its suburbs
- KMB Route 51, a bus route in Hong Kong
- London Buses route 51
- Road 51 (Iran)

== See also ==
- List of highways numbered 51
