= Tai Lam Liu =

Village in Sha Tin District, Hong Kong

Coordinates: 22.38341°N 114.217631°E

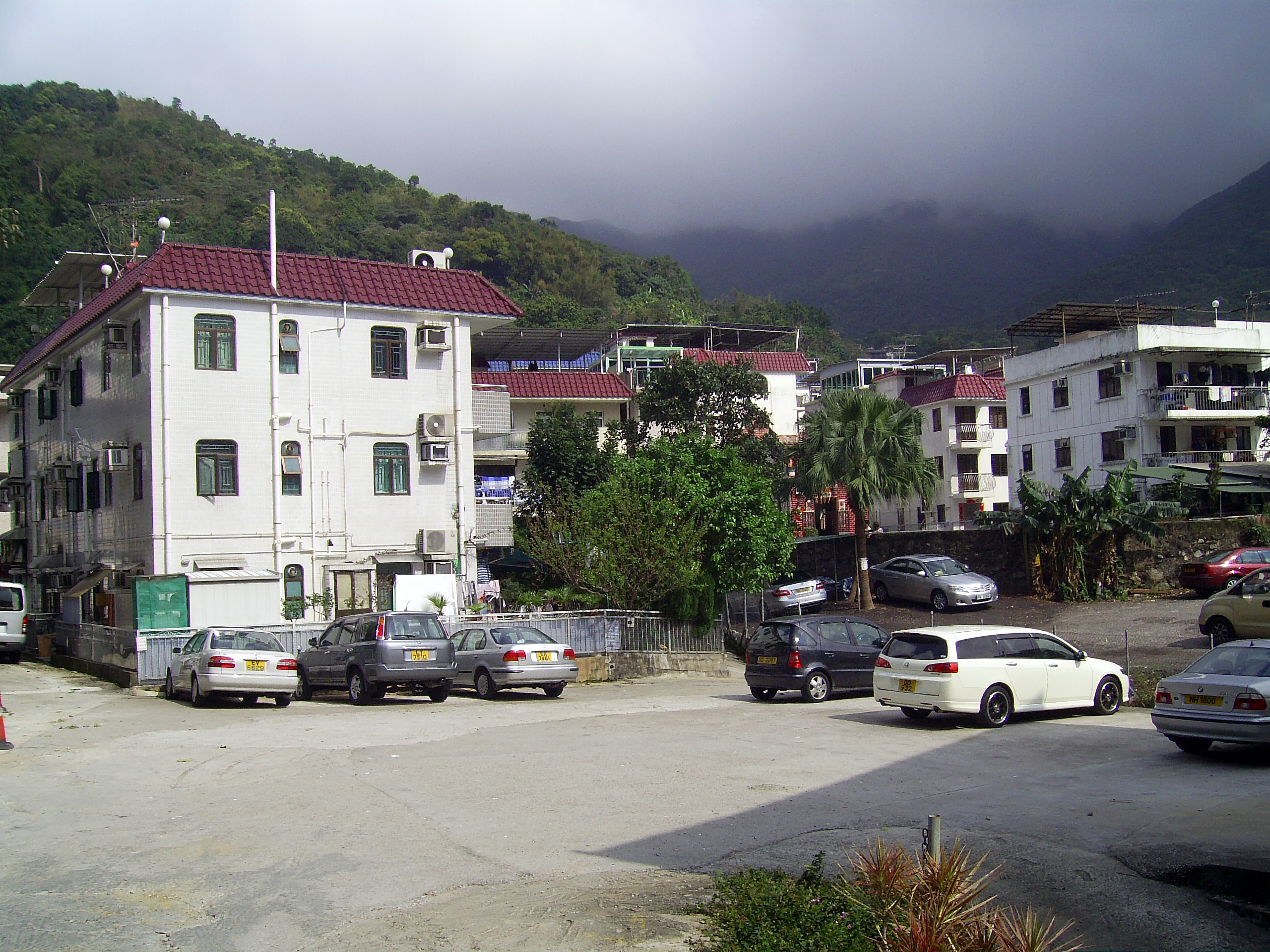
Tai Lam Liu.

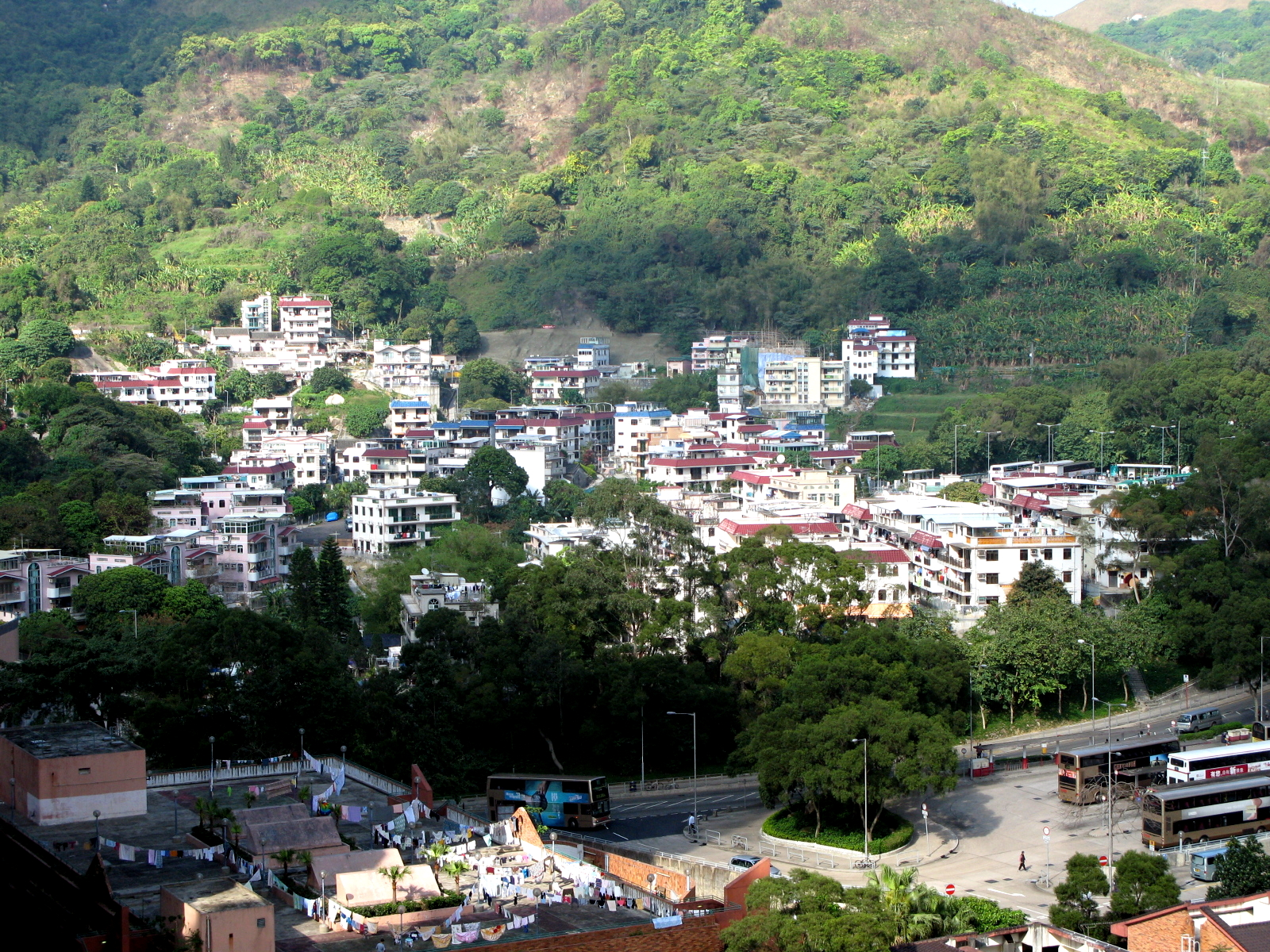
Distant view of Wong Nai Tau (centre) and Tai Lam Liu (background).

Tai Lam Liu (Chinese: 大藍寮) is a village in the Siu Lek Yuen area of Sha Tin District, Hong Kong.

== Administration ==
Tai Lam Liu is a recognized village under the New Territories Small House Policy. It is one of the villages represented within the Sha Tin Rural Committee. For electoral purposes, Tai Lam Liu is part of the Kwong Hong constituency, which was formerly represented by Ricardo Liao Pak-hong until July 2021.

== History ==
At the time of the 1911 census, the population of Tai Lam Liu was 57. The number of males was 23.
