= Metro-Scania =

Step-entrance single-deck bus

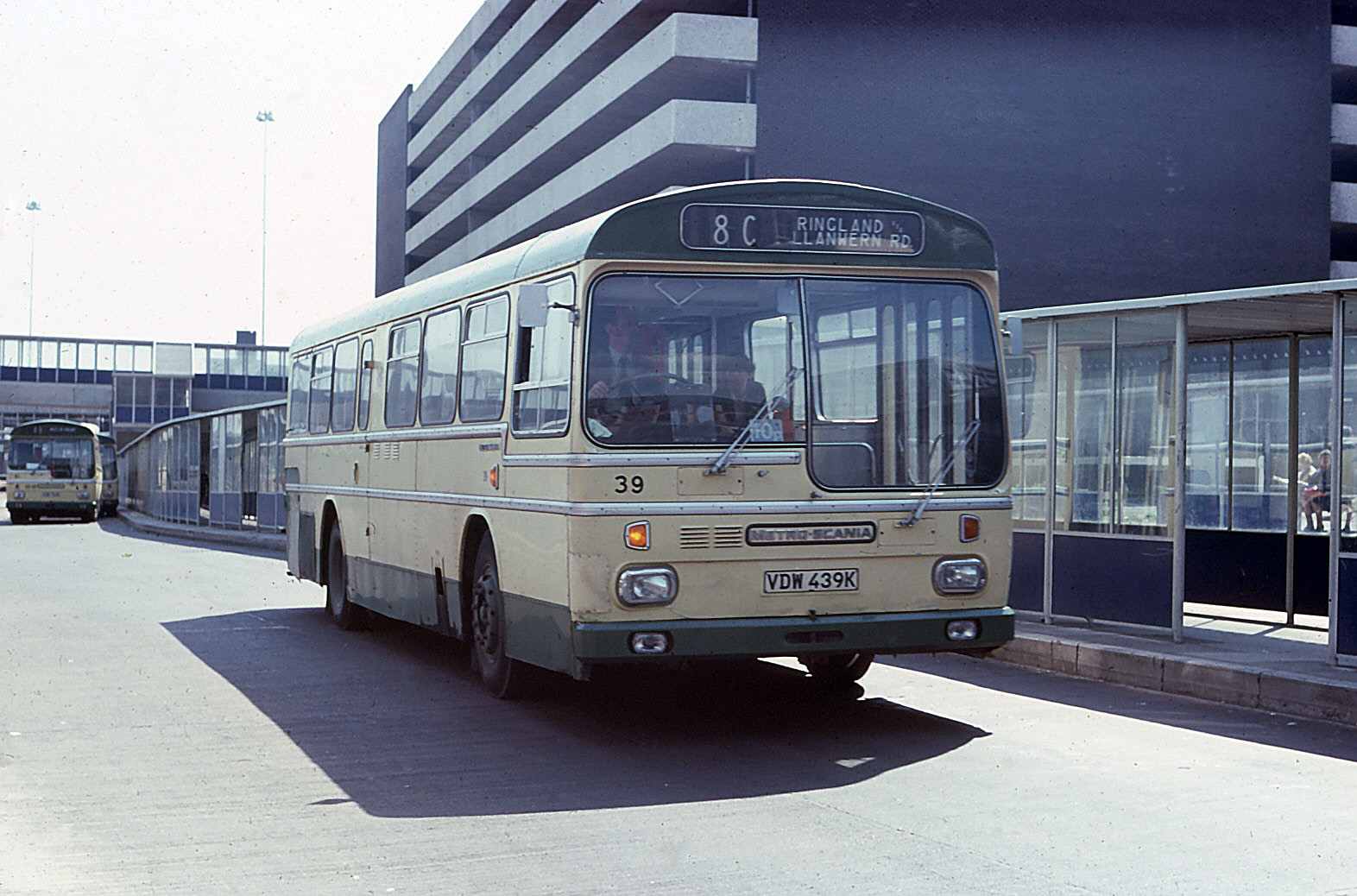
- Newport Transport Metro-Scania in May 1976

Overview
- Manufacturer: Metro Cammell Weymann; Scania
- Production: 1970-1973
- Assembly: Chassis: Scania-Vabis, Katrineholm, Sweden; Body: MCW, Washwood Heath, Birmingham, England

Body and chassis
- Doors: 2
- Floor type: Step entrance
- Chassis: Scania BR110/BR111
- Related: Scania Metropolitan

Powertrain
- Engine: Scania D11
- Capacity: 32 seated, 49 standing

Dimensions
- Length: 11 m (36 ft)

Chronology
- Successor: Scania N112

The Metro-Scania was a step-entrance single-deck bus body manufactured by Metro Cammell Weymann and Scania between 1970 and 1973.

== History ==
In 1969, Metro Cammell Weymann and Scania formed a joint venture to build a single deck bus to compete with the Leyland National. Built on the Scania BR110/BR111 chassis with Metro Cammell Weymann bodywork, the first was unveiled at the Commercial Motor Show at Earls Court Exhibition Centre in September 1970.

Like the double-deck Metropolitan, the Metro-Scania was noted for its performance from the turbocharged Scania engine and for a smoother and quiet ride through the use of air suspension. However, high fuel consumption plagued operators, particularly when the price of fuel rose during the 1973 oil crisis, and similar to the Metropolitan, issues with chassis corrosion lead to premature withdrawal of Metro-Scanias by most operators.

A total of 133 Metro-Scanias, including two demonstrators, were manufactured from 1970 to 1973. A majority of these were purchased by Newport Transport and Leicester Citybus, who took 44 and 35 Metro-Scanias respectively. Merseyside PTE purchased twenty Metro-Scanias, while SELNEC PTE would purchase thirteen and London Transport six, the latter split between the main fleet and London Country's 'Superbus' network. Two were also purchased for a short-lived operation in Merthyr Tydfil.
