= KMB Route 51 =

Bus route in Hong Kong

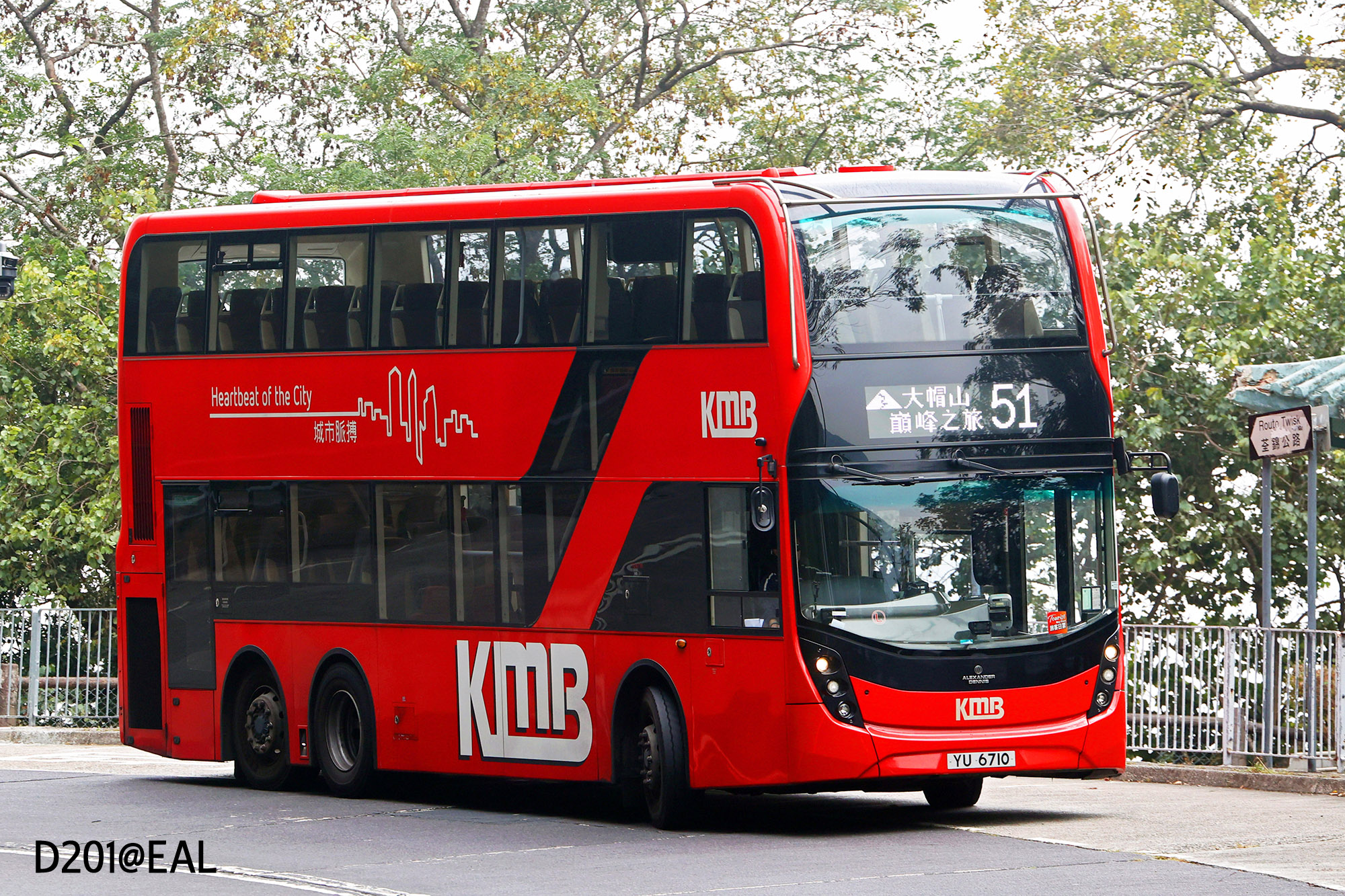

Overview
- Operator: Kowloon Motor Bus (KMB)
- Garage: Lai Chi Kok depot
- Vehicle: Alexander Dennis Enviro 200 Dart (AAU)

Route
- Start: Tsuen Wan (Nina Tower)
- Via: Tsuen Wan Station, Route Twisk
- End: Sheung Tsuen
- Length: 27.1 km
- Other routes: Taxis
- Competition: KMB Routes 251A or 251B to KMB routes 68M, 69M, 265M, 268M or 269M; New Territories Minibus Route 72 and 80

Service
- Level: 0600 - 2320
- Frequency: Mondays to Fridays: 40 - 60 mins. Saturdays, Sundays and public holidays: 15 - 60 mins.
- Journey time: 55 mins.

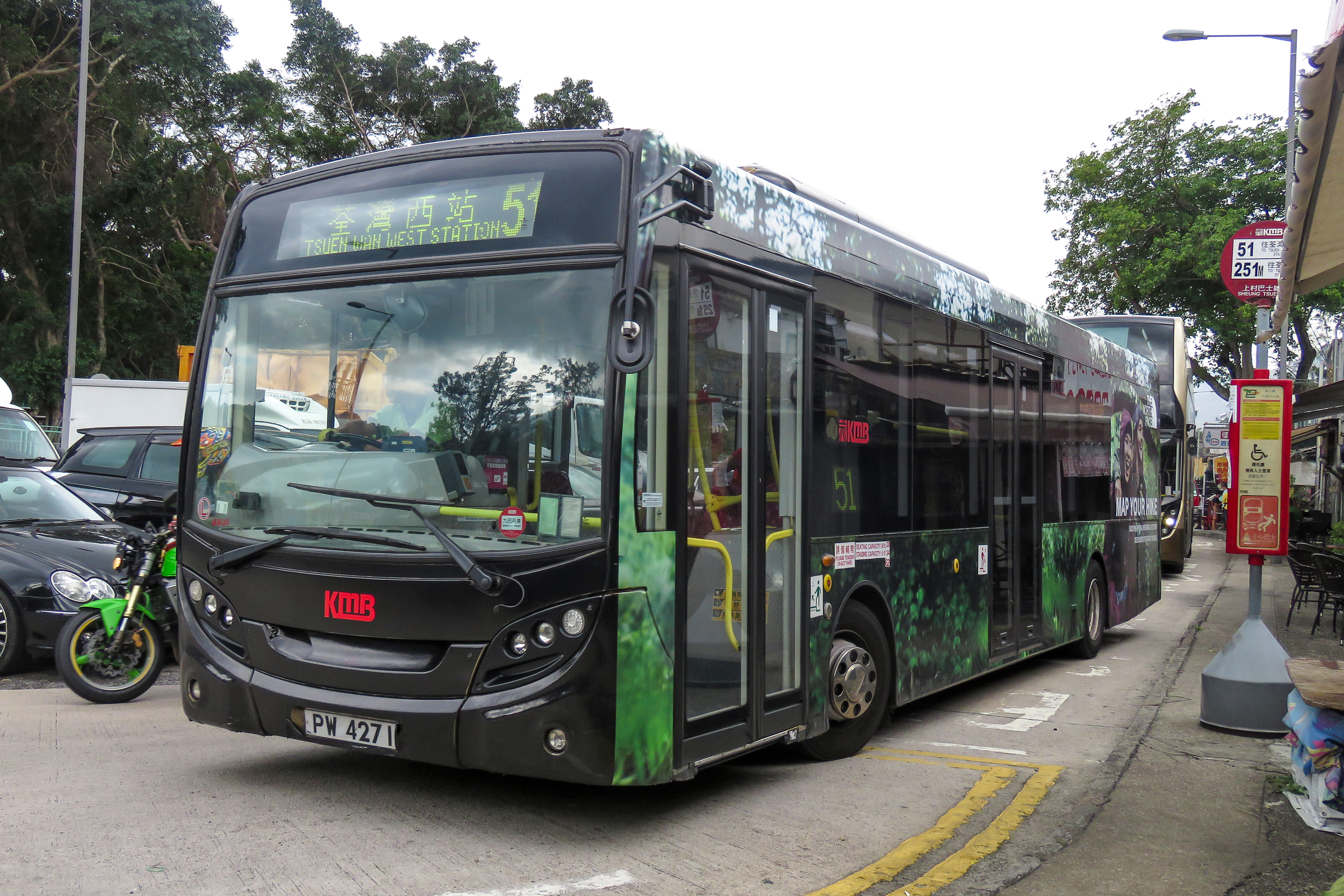
An Alexander Dennis Enviro200 on route 51 at Sheung Tsuen in 2018

Route 51 is a bus service operated by Kowloon Motor Bus (KMB) in Hong Kong's New Territories. It connects Tsuen Wan (Nina Tower) with Sheung Tsuen, a village in Pat Heung running via the steep and tortuous Route Twisk.

This route is the only public transport running along the whole length of Route Twisk, which is considered by its operator to be a kind of corporate social responsibility, providing a minimum service for the area along. It is the only bus route that serves the bus stop at the highest altitude in Hong Kong, and the first route to deploy double-decker buses on a mountainous route with steep gradients.

== History ==
The route was started on 24 June 1961 as Route 26, when Route Twisk, originally a military road, was opened to the public. Originally KMB operated it as a test route only, but because of the positive response received, the route became a permanent route. Due to the steepness of Route Twisk, the route was served using Albions for a long period of time. At that time, the route ran between Jordan Road Ferry Pier and Yuen Long, and was initially an express route, having only two stops between Lai Chi Kok and Shek Kong, which were at Tsuen Wan Town Centre and Tai Mo Shan. On 16 July 1973, as part of KMB's bus service arrangement scheme, the route was renumbered 51, and service was cut back to Tai Kok Tsui Ferry Pier.

Since Route Twisk was the most direct route between Yuen Long and Tsuen Wan, Route 51 received a high level of patronage, and at one time congestion was observed. In a 1970s report by the Works Department, a capacity deficit of 15% was recorded at Shek Kong (towards Tai Kok Tsui) during morning peak hours (07:00-08:00 hours), and the deficit towards Yuen Long even reached 30% during 12:00 to 13:00. Even so, KMB could not alter the type of bus due to technical problems, and could only increase the frequency of the route as a solution.

On 16 May 1982, Tsuen Wan line was opened, and Route 51 was cut further back to Tsuen Wan station, the number being changed to 51M. After 50M and 68M started service, both using Tuen Mun Road, the role of Route 51 being a main route between Yuen Long and Tsuen Wan diminished, so the northern terminus was changed to Kam Tin on 17 April 1983 with Tsuen Wan bound diverted via Kam Sheung Road. The northern section of the original route was relegated to route 54. On 16 December 1984 the Tsuen Wan terminus was changed to Tsuen Wan Ferry Pier with diversion via Tai Ho Road Flyover with the number changed back to 51.

In the late 1980s, the Albions servicing on the route were aging and needed replacements. However, no other suitable single-deckers in the KMB fleet were available at that time. KMB turned to its double deckers, but again none was suitable for the steep inclination of the route. so KMB fitted a Cummins LT10 280 hp engine and a manual decelerator into a 9.7m MCW Metrobus. The solution worked out, and KMB bought eight more 9.7m MCW Metrobuses (M81-M88) with special air-drawing fans to serve Route 51 with special limitation of 3 standing passengers for the safety issues.

After that, the buses that serving 51 were specifically altered, so other buses cannot run on the route, and if a bus on the route needed a repair, a replacement could not be found, affecting the frequency of the route. Later KMB fitted the Cummins engine into more Metrobuses for operating on the route due to high repair frequency of M81-M88.

On 10 August 1992, a special service, 51P, was started, from Shek Kong swimming pool to Tsuen Wan. In 1996, KMB assigned two air-conditioned Dennis Dart buses (AA) fitted with manual decelerators to Route 51. In the same year, the District Councils of Tsuen Wan and Yuen Long planned to divert Route 51 to Tai Lam Tunnel once it had been completed with terminus relocated to Sheung Tsuen via Kam Sheung Road, but to avoid loss of bus service on Route Twisk, KMB ended up creating a new route numbered 251M. Patronage on 51 dropped so much that 51P was discontinued.

On 19 March 2000, the Tsuen Wan terminus was moved to a newly built one at Nina Tower. On 7 September 2008, the other end was relocated, after over 25 years of stationing of Kam Tin Bus Terminus, to Kam Sheung Road Railway Station. This has improved connections for West Rail line commuters of Tuen Mun and Yuen Long to Tai Mo Shan Country Park.

On 27 January 2013, the Tsuen Wan Terminus was moved to Tsuen Wan West Station Public Transport Interchange to tie in with the TW5 property development and permanent closure of the Tsuen Wan Transport Complex until 8 April 2019.

On 4 October 2014, the northern terminus was cut to Sheung Tsuen and became a circular route, with service frequency cut to one departure per hour except on weekends daytime.

On 24 August 2025, after a nearly 27-year gap, double-decker buses were deployed to replace the previous single-deck buses. The reason was to accommodate higher passenger demand during the Tai Mo Shan hiking season.

== Routing ==
Via: Tai Ho Road, Tai Ho Road North, Route Twisk Interchange, Route Twisk, Kam Tin Road, Sheung Tsuen Bus Terminus, Kam Tin Road, Route Twisk, Route Twisk Interchange, Tai Ho Road North and Tai Ho Road.

=== Stops Along the Route ===
Nina Tower Bus Terminus|Tsuen Wan (Nina Tower) Departure
No.	Stop Name	Location
1	Nina Tower Bus Terminus	Tsuen Wan (Nina Tower) Bus Terminus
2	Tai Ho Road	
3	Tsuen Wan Station	Tai Ho Road North
4	Pak Tin Pa Tsuen	Route Twisk
5	Kwong Pan Tin Tsuen Section 1	Route Twisk
6	Kwong Pan Tin Tsuen Section 2	Route Twisk
7	Tso Kung Tam Outdoor Recreation Centre	Route Twisk
8	Ha Fa Shan Village	Route Twisk
9	Tai Kiu Village	Route Twisk
10	Chuen Lung	Route Twisk
11	San Hoi Tin Village	Route Twisk
12#	Tai Mo Shan Country Park	Route Twisk
13#	Route Twisk Lookout	Route Twisk
14#	Shek Kong Village	Route Twisk
15#	Shek Kong Camp	Route Twisk
16#	Lui Kung Tin Village	Route Twisk
17#	Shek Kong	Route Twisk
18	Sheung Tsuen Bus Terminus	
19	Shek Kong	Route Twisk
20	Lui Kung Tin Village	Route Twisk
21	Shek Kong Camp	Route Twisk
22	Shek Kong Village	Route Twisk
23#	Tai Mo Shan Country Park	Route Twisk
24#	Ha Tsuen	Route Twisk
25#	Chuen Lung	Route Twisk
26#	Tai Kiu Village	Route Twisk
27	Ko Pan Tin Village Section 4	Route Twisk
28	Ho Koon Outdoor Recreation Centre	Route Twisk
29	Ko Pan Tin Village Section 2	Route Twisk
30#	Ko Pan Tin Village Section 1	Route Twisk
31#	Muk Min Ha Village	Route Twisk
32	Tsuen Wan Station	Tai Ho Road North
33	Nina Tower Bus Terminus	Tsuen Wan (Nina Tower) Bus Terminus

Stations with '#' are mandatory bus stops.

Sheung Tsuen Bus Terminus is a loop turnaround point and full fare recovery point. All passengers must pay the fare again after reaching this stop to continue to the various stops along the way to Tsuen Wan (Nina Tower).

== Fleet ==
The route used to be served by Dennis Dart single deckers (fleet prefix: AA) from Tuen Mun Depot (depot code: U). From mid-2011, most of the Darts have been replaced by Alexander Dennis Enviro200 Darts, owing to their age. As of August 2011, all of the Darts have been replaced by the Enviro200 Darts (AAU). Now there are two Enviro200 Darts serving this route, which is AAU8 (PW4271) and AAU14 (PX5111).

== Usage status ==
Currently, due to the line serving low populated areas, frequent jockey cars parade the streets occur, except on weekends, when it can reach top gate due to hikers going to Tai Mo Shan (as this is the only public transport to get there).

== See also ==
- List of bus routes in Hong Kong
