= Wong Nai Tau =

Village in Hong Kong

Coordinates: 22.382249°N 114.216896°E

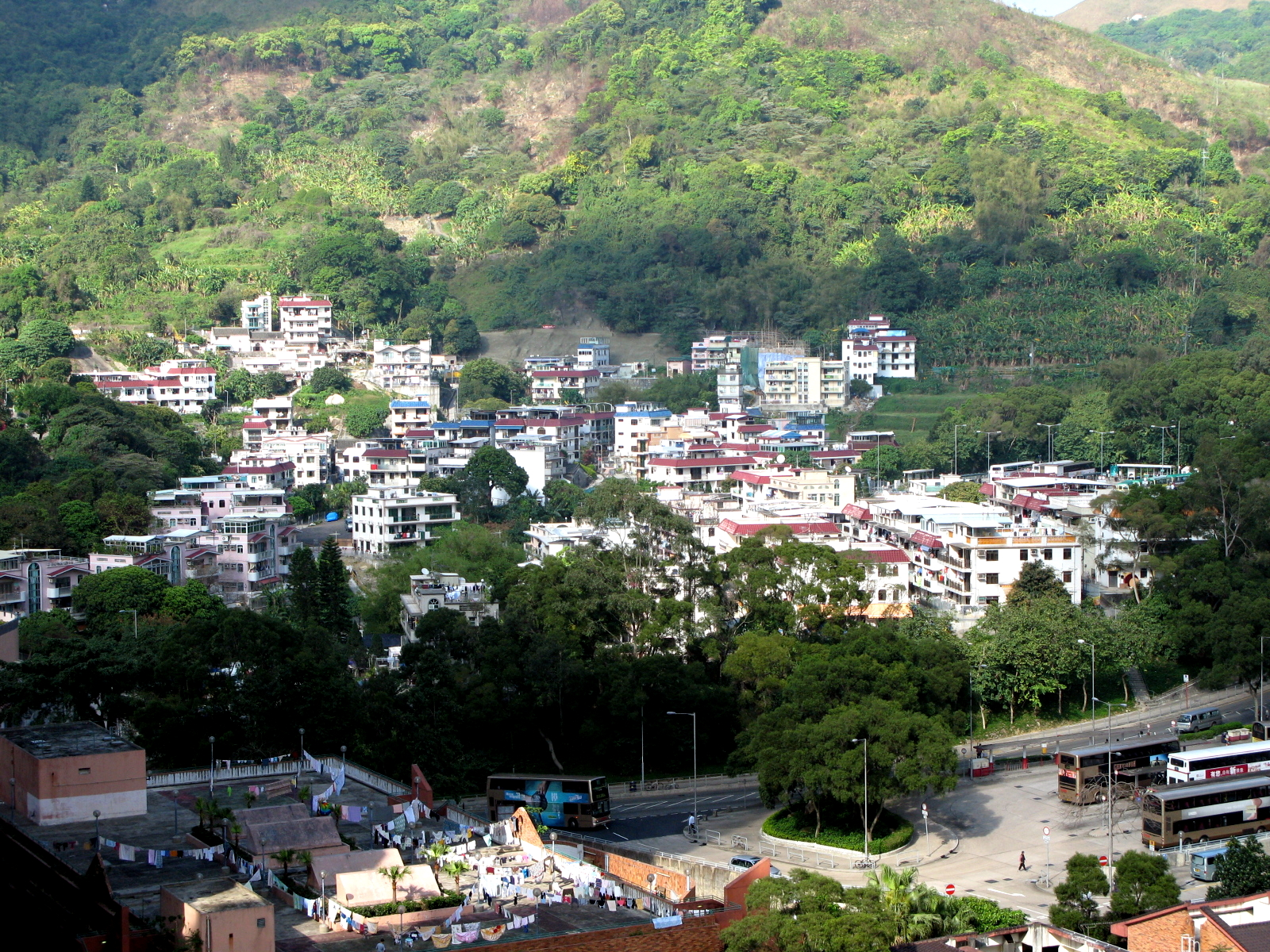
Wong Nai Tau (centre) and Tai Lam Liu (background).

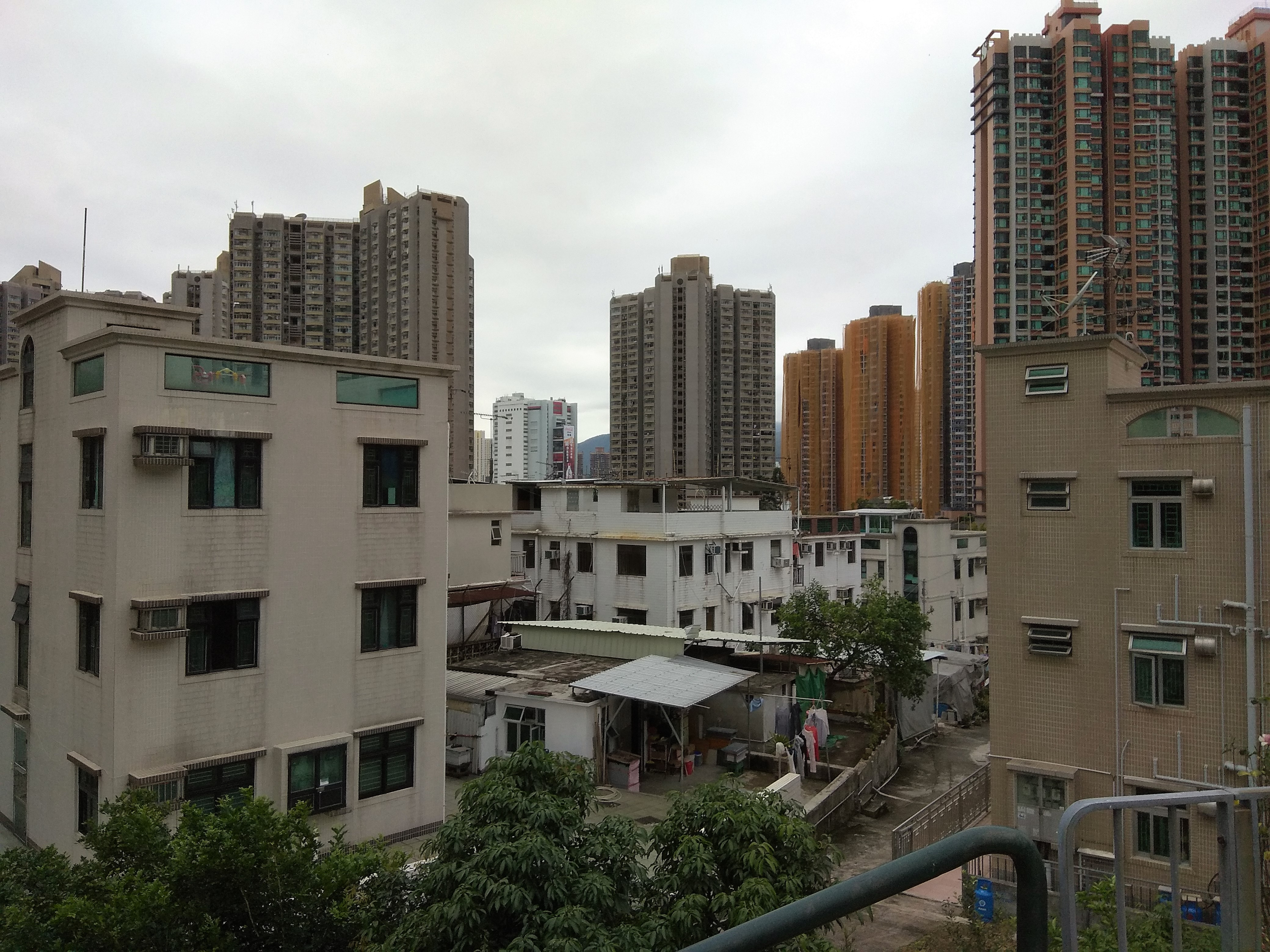
Wong Nai Tau in 2019.

Wong Nai Tau (Chinese: 黃泥頭) is a village in the Siu Lek Yuen area of Sha Tin District, Hong Kong.

== Administration ==
Wong Nai Tau is a recognized village under the New Territories Small House Policy.

== See also ==
- Kau Yeuk (Sha Tin)
