= Metro Cammell Weymann =

Former British bus manufacturer

Metro Cammell Weymann (MCW)
- Formerly: Metropolitan-Cammell-Weymann
- Industry: Manufacturing
- Predecessors: Metro Cammell; Weymann Motor Bodies
- Founded: 1932
- Defunct: 1989
- Fate: Sold by the Laird Group; some bus designs sold to Optare
- Headquarters: Washwood Heath, Birmingham, England; Elmdon, Solihull, England (1944–1969)
- Products: Bus bodywork Integral buses and coaches
- Owner: Laird Group

Metro Cammell Weymann Ltd. (MCW) was a British bus manufacturer and bus body builder based at Washwood Heath in Birmingham, England. MCW was established in 1932 by Metro-Cammell's bus bodybuilding division and Weymann Motor Bodies as a sales organisation pooling its resources to jointly produce bus bodies.

MCW bus bodies were built in Metro-Cammell's and Weymann's factories until 1966, when Weymann's factory in Addlestone was closed. All work was then moved to Metro-Cammell's Elmdon factory, while the Metro-Cammell and Weymann brand names were discontinued in the same year. After 25 years spent headquartered in Elmdon, MCW moved back to its original Washwood Heath headquarters in 1969. From 1977 onward, MCW also built bus chassis with the launch of the integral MCW Metrobus double-decker bus.

In 1989, the Laird Group decided to sell its bus and rail divisions. No buyer for all of the subdivisions could be found, so each product was sold separately to various companies interested in its assets. The Metrorider was bought by Optare who relaunched it as the MetroRider; the Metrobus design was bought by DAF (chassis) and Optare (body), who jointly reworked it into the Optare Spectra; the Metroliner design was acquired by Optare though not pursued, and the Metrocab was bought by Reliant. Metro-Cammell's rail division and the Washwood Heath factory went to GEC Alsthom.

== Products ==
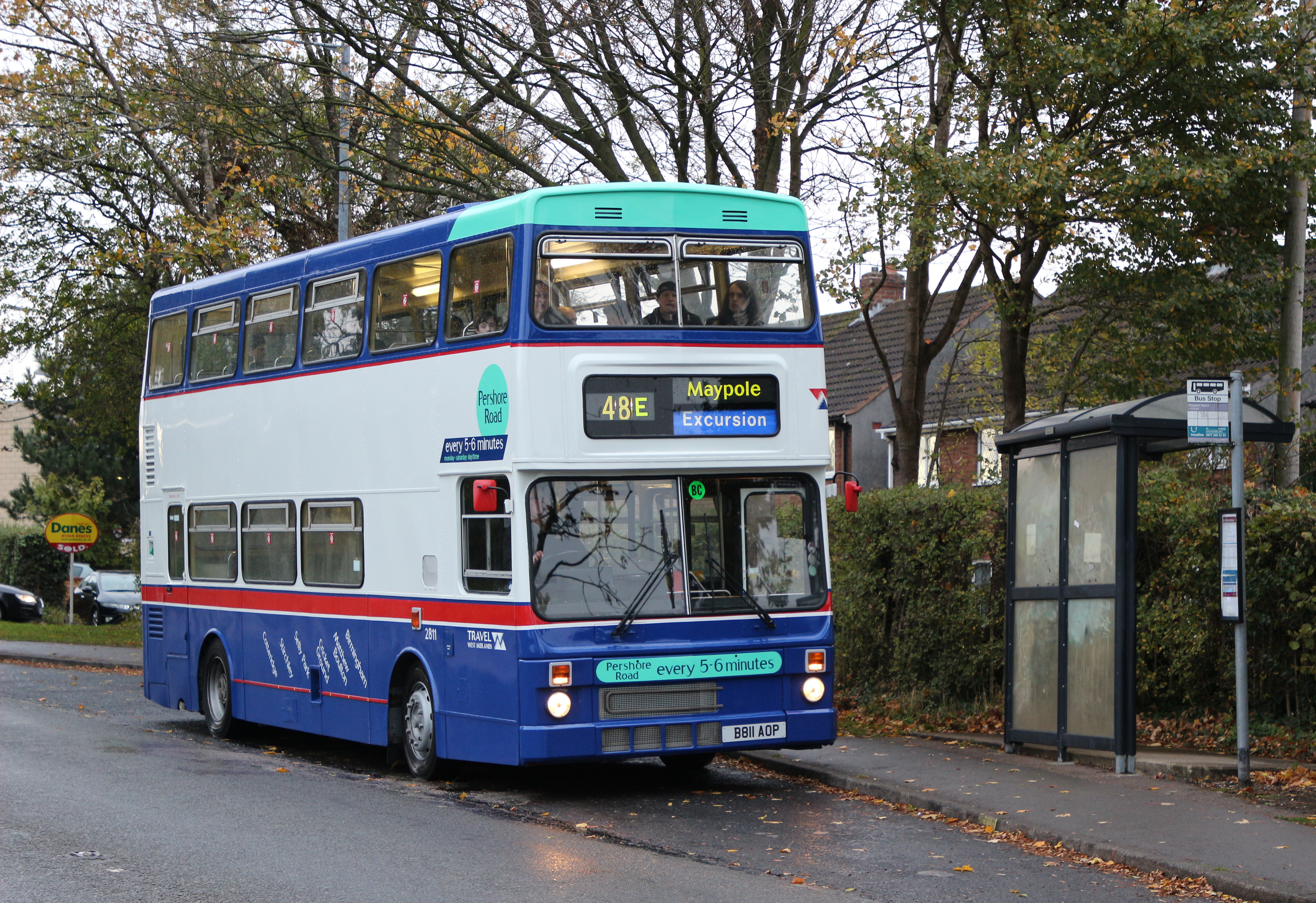
Preserved Travel West Midlands Mk2 MCW Metrobus in Highter's Heath, Birmingham

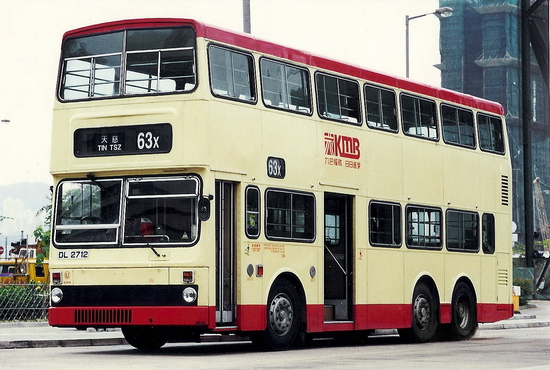
Kowloon Motor Bus 3-axle Metro Cammell Weymann Super Metrobus (11 metres (36 ft)) in Hong Kong

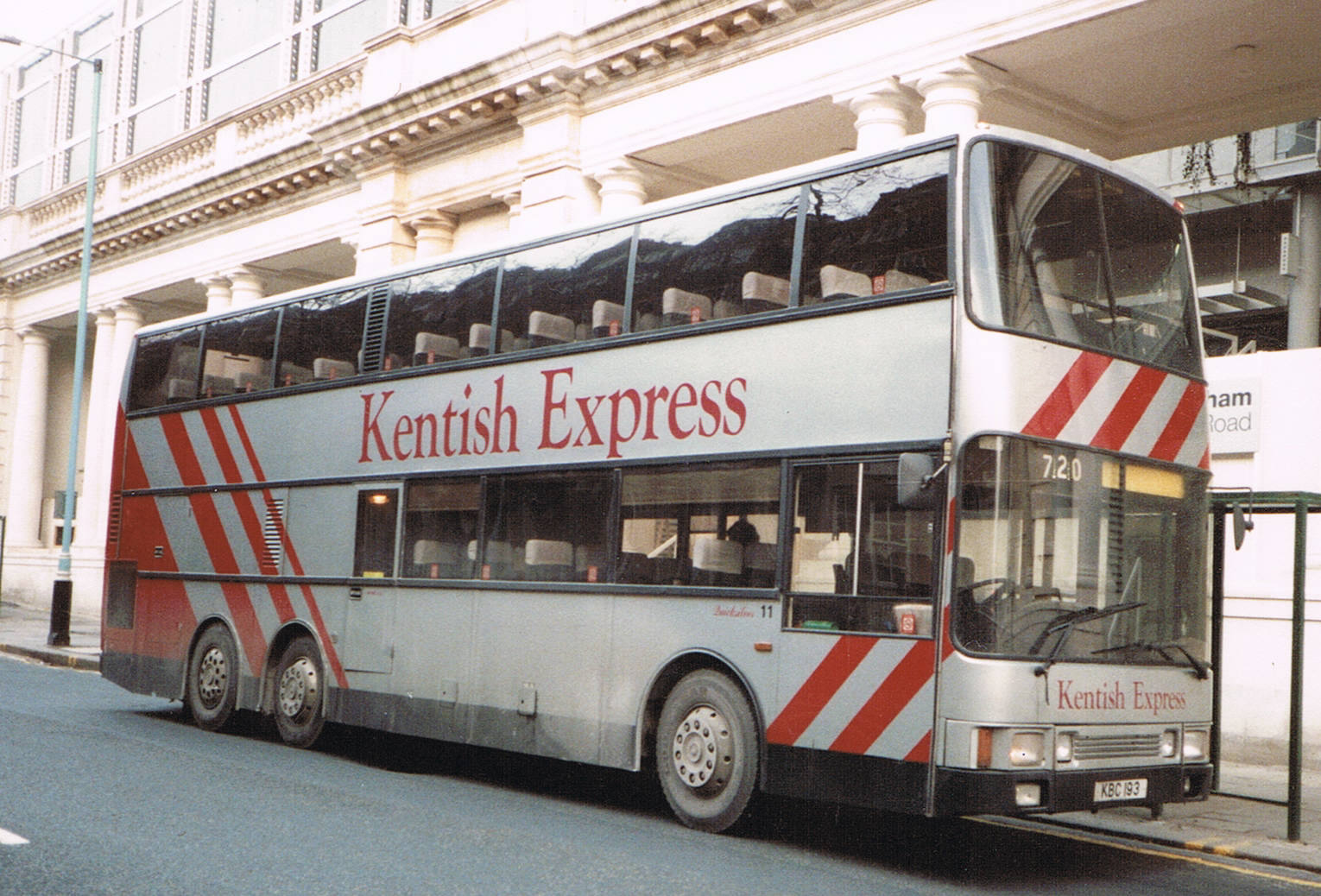
Kentish Bus MCW Metroliner DR130 on Buckingham Palace Road in London

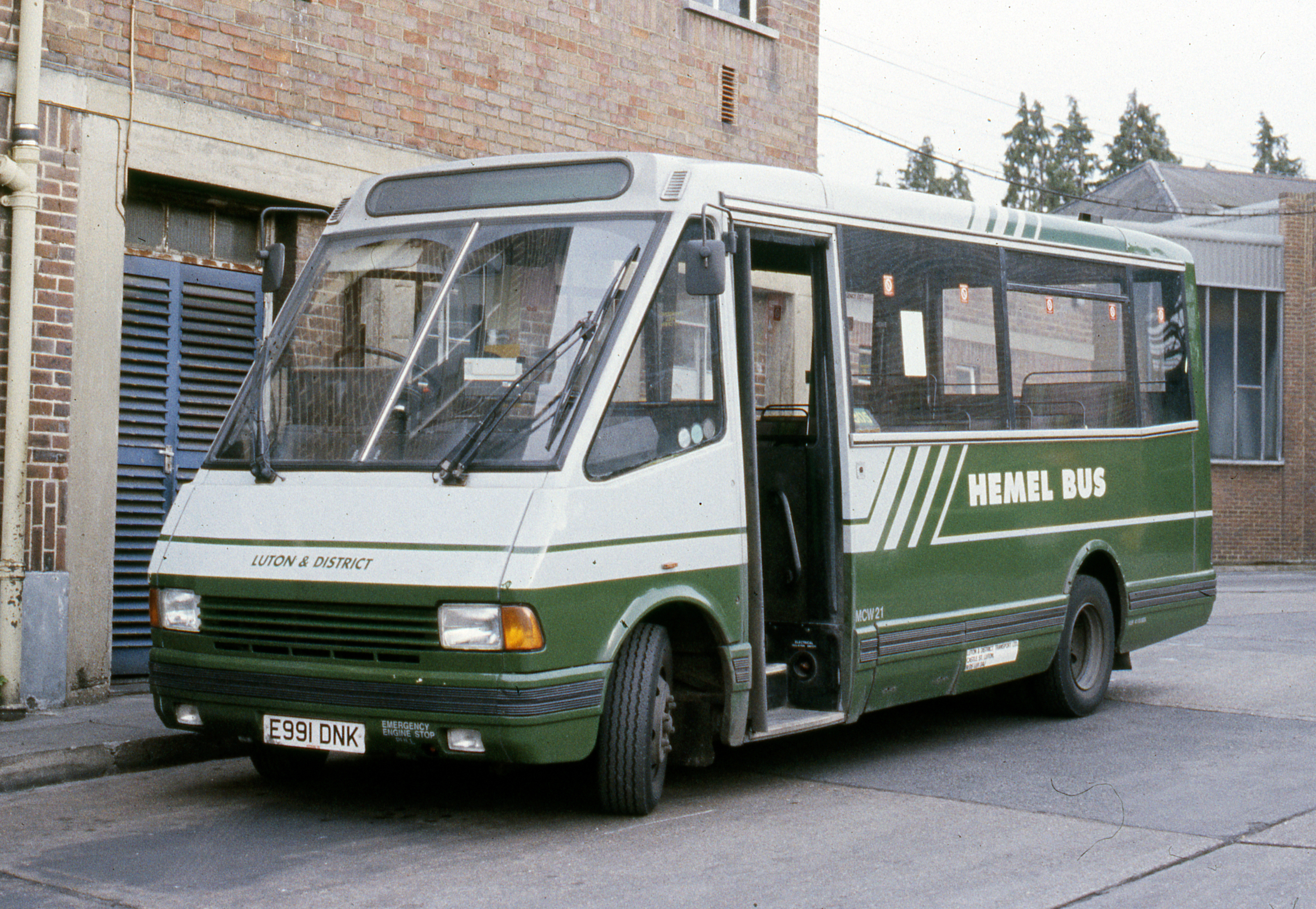
London Country North West MCW Metrorider in Hemel Hempstead in 1992

=== Bodies ===
- London Transport RF
- London Transport RLH
- Orion series
- London Transport's DMS body built in partnership with Park Royal throughout the 1970s.
- West Midland PTE's standard bus body in the 1970s on both the Daimler/Leyland Fleetline (again built in partnership with Park Royal) and the Bristol VR.
- A generic double deck body range built in the 1970s on Leyland Atlantean and Daimler Fleetline chassis with notable customers being the Merseyside, Tyne & Wear and West Midlands PTE's.

=== Chassis/Complete buses ===
- Metro-Scania - semi-integral single decker using Scania running units
- Metropolitan - semi-integral double decker based on Scania running units
- Metrobus - double decker
  - Mark 1
  - Mark 2
  - Mark 2A
  - Note: also bodied by Alexander (mainly for the Scottish Bus Group and the Merseyside/West Yorkshire PTE's) and Northern Counties (for Greater Manchester PTE)
- Metroliner - single and double deck coach
  - Metroliner - semi-integral 4.23 m high double deck coach
  - Metroliner 400GT - integral 4 m high double deck coach
  - Metroliner - semi-integral 3.2 m high single deck coach
  - Metro Hiliner - Integral 3.4 m high single deck coach
- Metrorider - midibus

=== Others ===
- Metrocab - London taxi cab
