= Newport Bus =

Municipal bus operator in Newport, Wales

Coordinates: 51°35′12.515″N 2°58′57.83″W

Newport Bus Bws Casnewydd

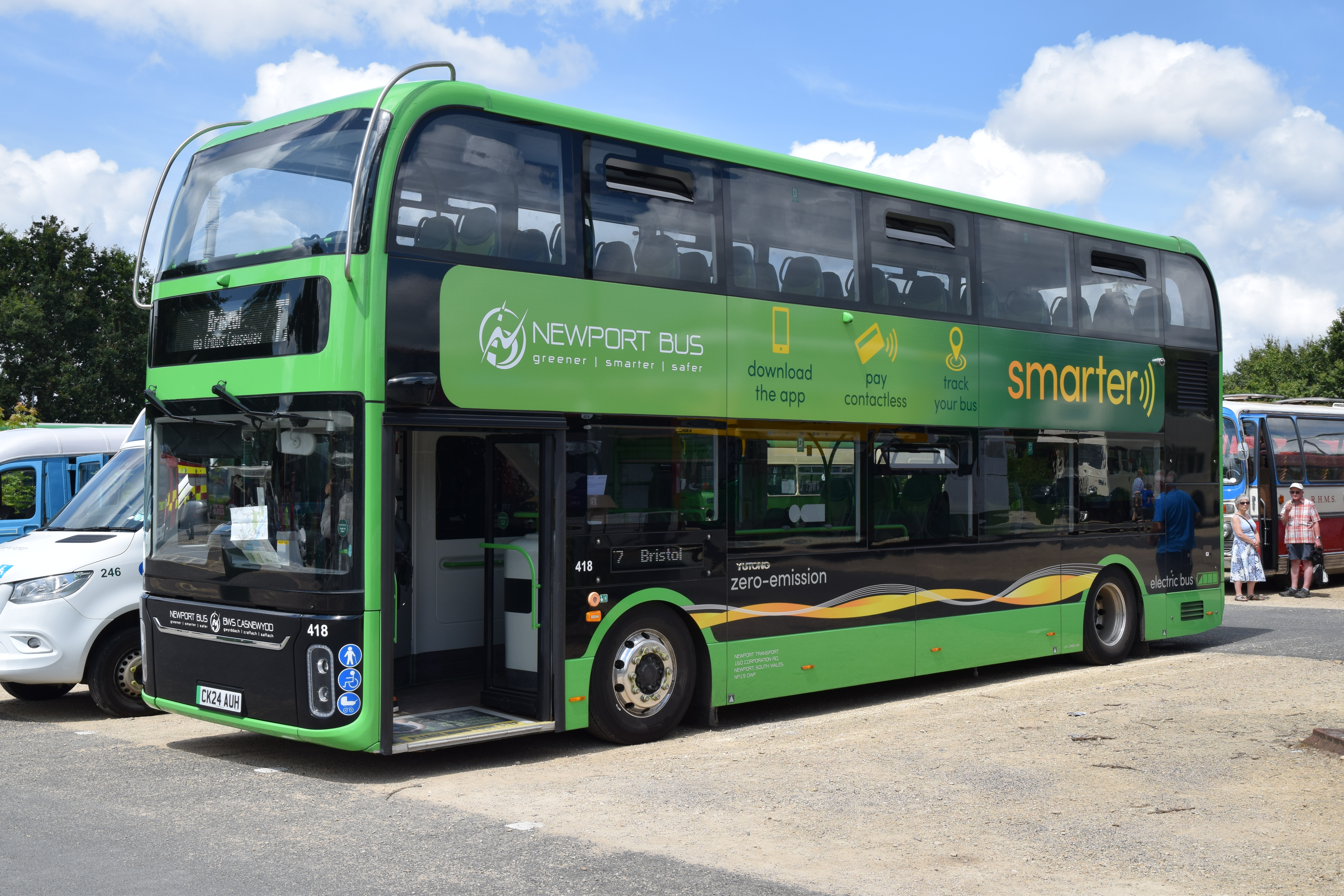
- Yutong U11DD in July 2024
- Parent: Newport City Council
- Founded: 1 July 1901; 125 years ago
- Headquarters: Corporation Road, Newport
- Locale: Newport, Wales
- Service area: South Wales; Forest of Dean District
- Service type: Bus
- Routes: 82 (including school routes)
- Destinations: Cardiff; Chepstow; Monmouth; Newport; Cribbs Causeway; Bristol; Lydney; Cinderford
- Hubs: Newport bus station
- Annual ridership: 7.6 million
- Fuel type: Diesel; Electric
- Operator: Newport Transport Limited
- Chair Managing Director: Cllr Debbie Harvey; Morgan Stevens
- Website: www.newportbus.co.uk

Newport Bus (the operating name of Newport Transport Limited) is the main provider of bus services in the city of Newport, Wales. A limited company whose shares are wholly owned by Newport City Council, it is one of the few remaining municipal bus companies in the United Kingdom.

== History ==
In 1901, the Newport Corporation took over the town's horse-drawn bus service, establishing a municipal bus operation.

Motorbus services began in April 1924, although the corporation was prohibited from running services beyond Rogerstone and Langstone without the assent of local councils by the Newport Corporation Act 1925. This prohibition was removed in 1981, allowing then-Newport Borough Council to operate more extensive services.

By 1985, the Borough Transport Department held responsibility for the town's bus services. Following passage of the Transport Act 1985, which deregulated the UK bus network and required local councils to transfer the functions of their bus operations to commercial entities, a stand-alone company limited by shares was incorporated on 10 March 1986. Initially named Newport Buses Ltd, the company was renamed Newport Transport Ltd on 9 October 1986, before formally taking over operation of bus services in Newport from the Borough Transport Department on 26 October 1986.

In the 1980s, Newport Transport was the largest operator of Scanias in the United Kingdom. It also operated Renault 50 midibuses.

They also introduced their 'Nipper' bus; it was a midibus fleet (smaller buses) operated by Newport Transport The ‘Nipper’ was a branding for the smaller Alexander Dennis Enviro 200 and Dennis Dart SLF vehicles. However, that branding is sadly no longer in use. These compact little buses were well-suited for narrow residential streets, estates, community feeders, and off-peak services. The first ‘Nipper’ bus service was introduced in 1987, and the service originally operated on routes 1A/C and 17A/C/X serving Rogerstone and Mount Pleasant.

Late 1980s to 1990s. The ‘Nipper’ branding was in its full glory on midibuses, seen regularly around the town and on Route 30 specials. Early 2000s. There was a continued presence on Route 30 (especially Sunday/evening journeys) with Optare MetroRiders and Dennis Darts. By 2008–2010. As newer low-floor buses came in and Newport Bus unified its fleet livery (2009), the dedicated Nipper branding faded away. they were very useful for short journeys an ideal for going round the various estates in Newport.

The bus operation was rebranded from Newport Transport to Newport Bus in 2011.

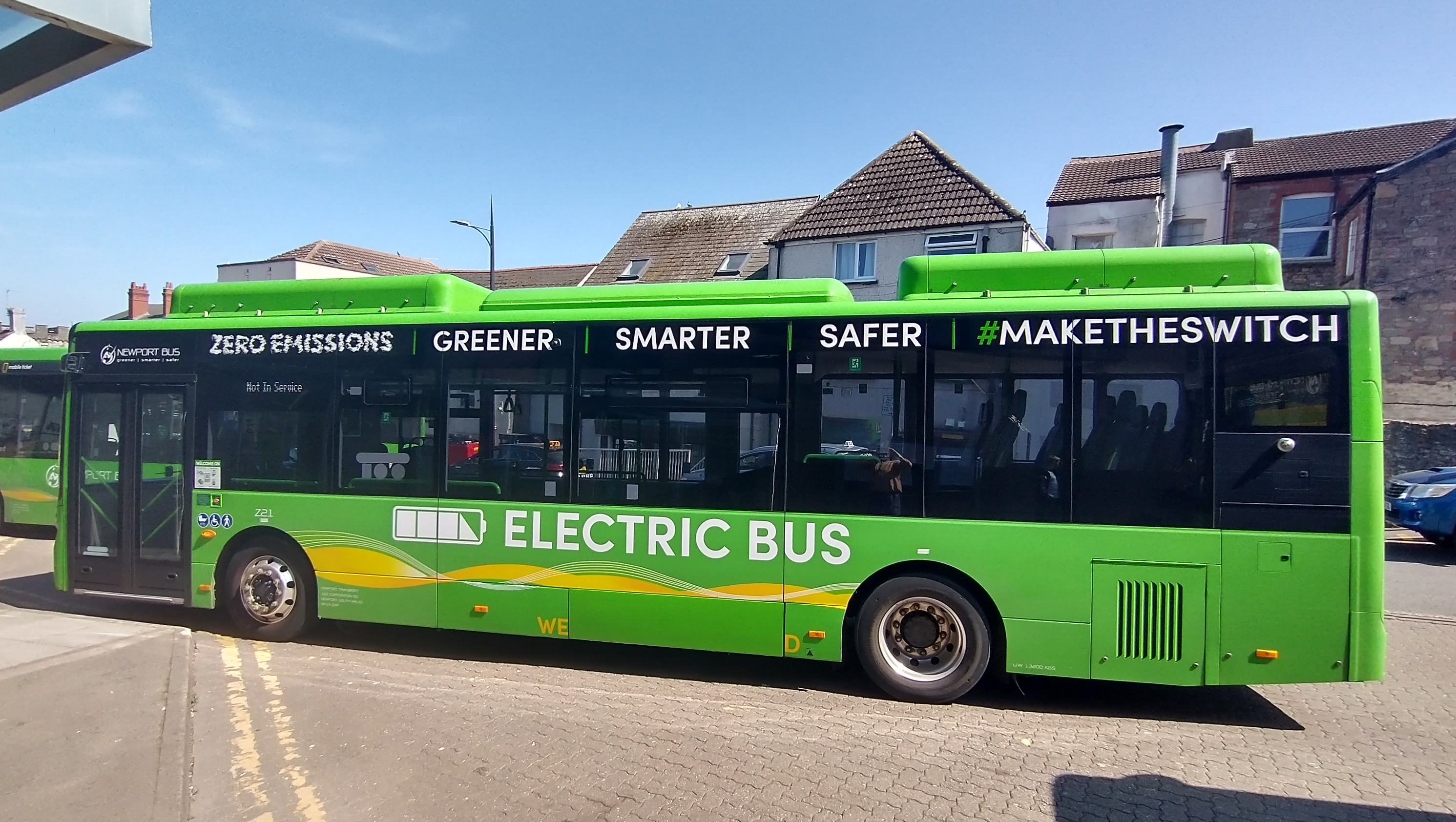
An electric Yutong E10 at Chepstow bus station in 2025

After receiving a £1 million grant from the Office of Low Emission Vehicles in February 2019, the company placed an order for 15 fully-electric, zero-emission Yutong E12 buses. The first demonstrator vehicle, funded by the grant, began operating in August 2019, with the remaining vehicles entering service in 2020, the first electric buses to operate in Wales. Following additional funding of £2.8 million from the UK Department for Transport (DfT) and commercial partnerships, a further 16 Yutong vehicles were ordered in April 2021. Further deliveries of Yutong E12s as well as E10s between 2022 and 2023 would take Newport's total fleet of Yutong electric buses to 44 by May 2023.

On 1 March 2020, the company introduced the Ticketer contactless payment system on all its routes, a system used by Cardiff Bus since 2018, enabling payment by card and NFC-enabled devices, as well as recognition of QR codes from paper day/week tickets. The company also aims to provide ticket sales and journey tracking though a mobile app in the first half of 2020, to be followed by real-time bus information. However, Newport Bus does not currently allow "tap-on, tap-off" payment, unlike Cardiff Bus and Stagecoach South Wales; contactless payments are accepted for printed tickets, but there is no cap system.

On 18 May 2020, in partnership with Transport for Wales (TfW), and its parent local council, Newport Bus transferred some of its routes to Fflecsi, a demand responsive transport service in the city, in which Newport Bus continues to operate the service but is commanded by TfW. The scheme ended on 25 September 2022.

== Services ==
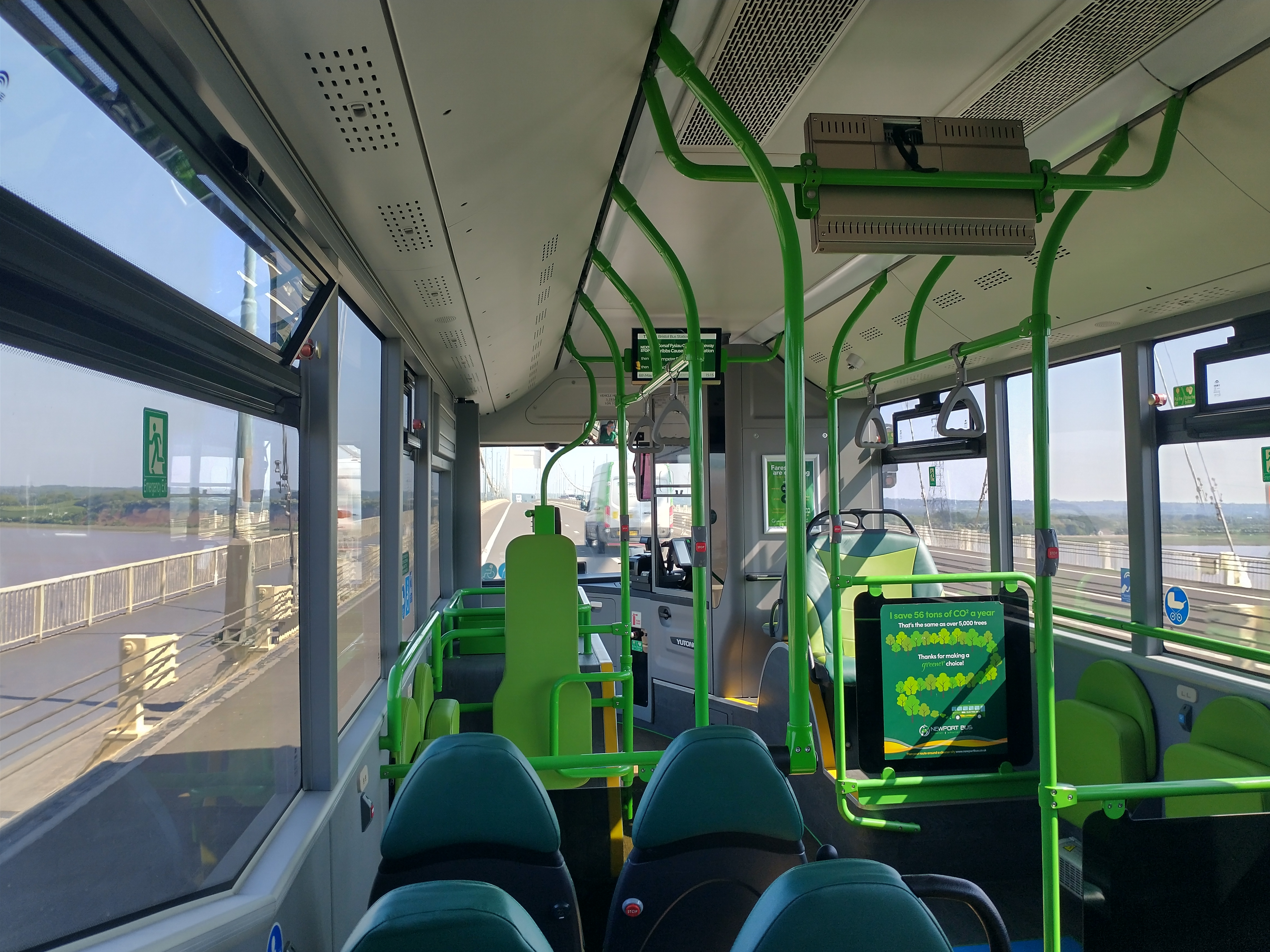
Front interior if an electric Yutong E10 single deck bus on the Severn Bridge in 2025

Newport Bus operates a network of services from Newport bus station throughout the city; services extend as far as Chepstow in the east, including three local services within Chepstow, Monmouth in the north, and Cardiff in the west. Route 30 to Cardiff is operated in partnership with Cardiff Bus.

As of 4 January 2021, Newport Bus operates TrawsCymru route T7 from Chepstow to Bristol via Cribbs Causeway shopping and leisure centre.

As of 2020, discussions are ongoing with TfW for the network to form part of the South Wales Metro rail and bus project.

The company operates Fflecsi services in two zones (1 and 26) centred on Rogerstone and St. Julian's respectively (overlapping in the city centre), which replaced solely operated Newport Bus routes 1, 1B, 11A and 11C in Zone 1, and 26A and 26C in Zone 2. The service is a trial project, but was extended beyond the initial time frame for a further year following funding by TfW. The Fflecsi scheme is to end after 25 September 2022 and Newport Bus has introduced or amended other routes from 4 September 2022 as a replacement.

Newport Bus operates four tendered services in the Forest of Dean District on behalf of Gloucestershire County Council. These are: 72 (Chepstow - Lydney - Cinderford - Mitcheldean); C4 (Chepstow - Sedbury - Beachley); 710 (Cinderford town circular); 711 (Buckshaft - Cinderford - The Pludds).

Newport Bus runs express coach services on behalf of FlixBus from Swansea, Cardiff and Newport to London and Gatwick respectively.

The company also offers various commercial transport services.

== Livery ==
The original pre-war livery of maroon was changed to green and cream in the 1940s and remained the same until August 2009, when it was replaced with a livery of dark green and white with lime green and grey logos at the rear. From 2018, a new livery of all-over green was introduced.

== Gallery ==
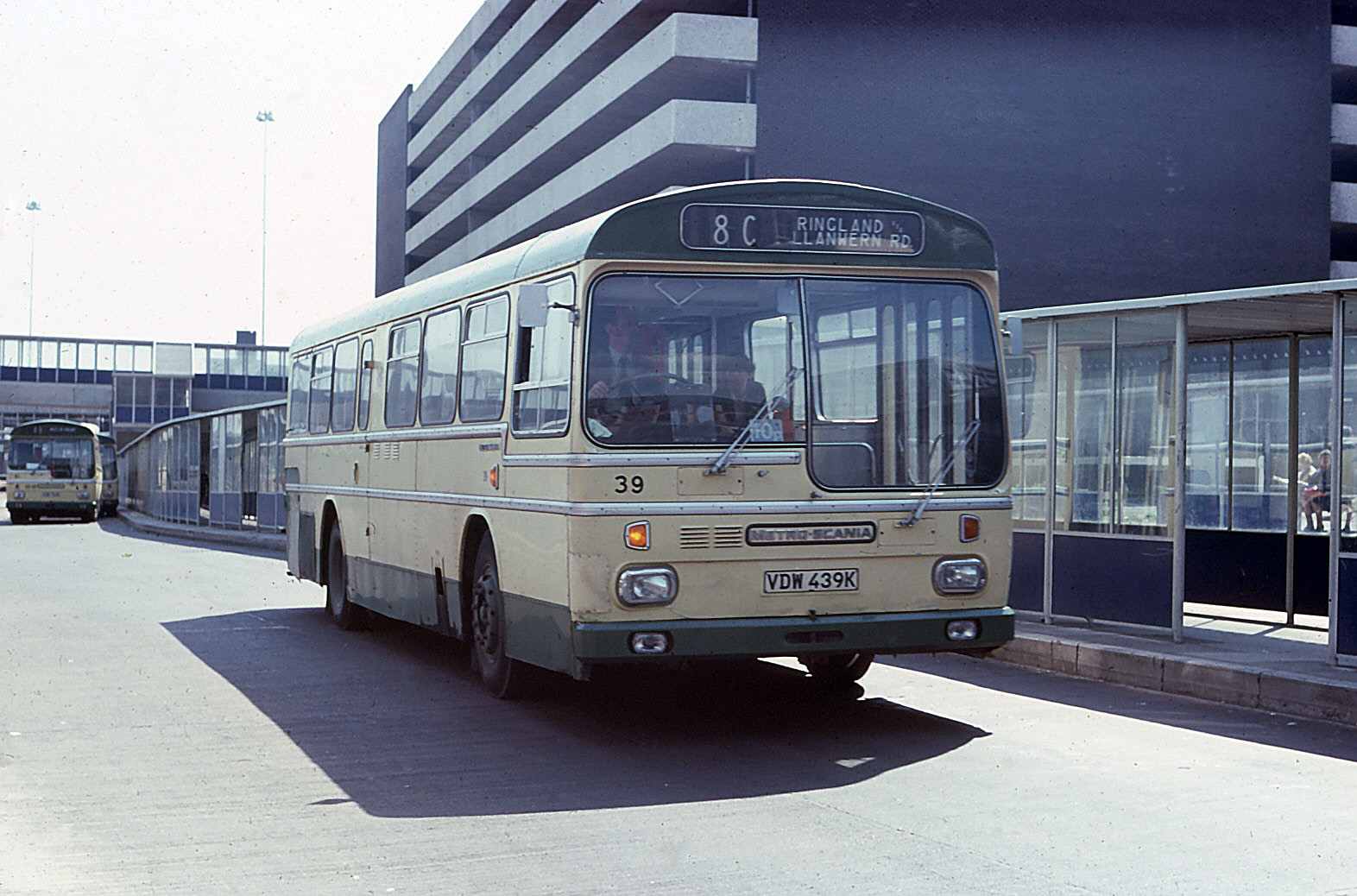
Metro-Scania at Newport bus station in 1976

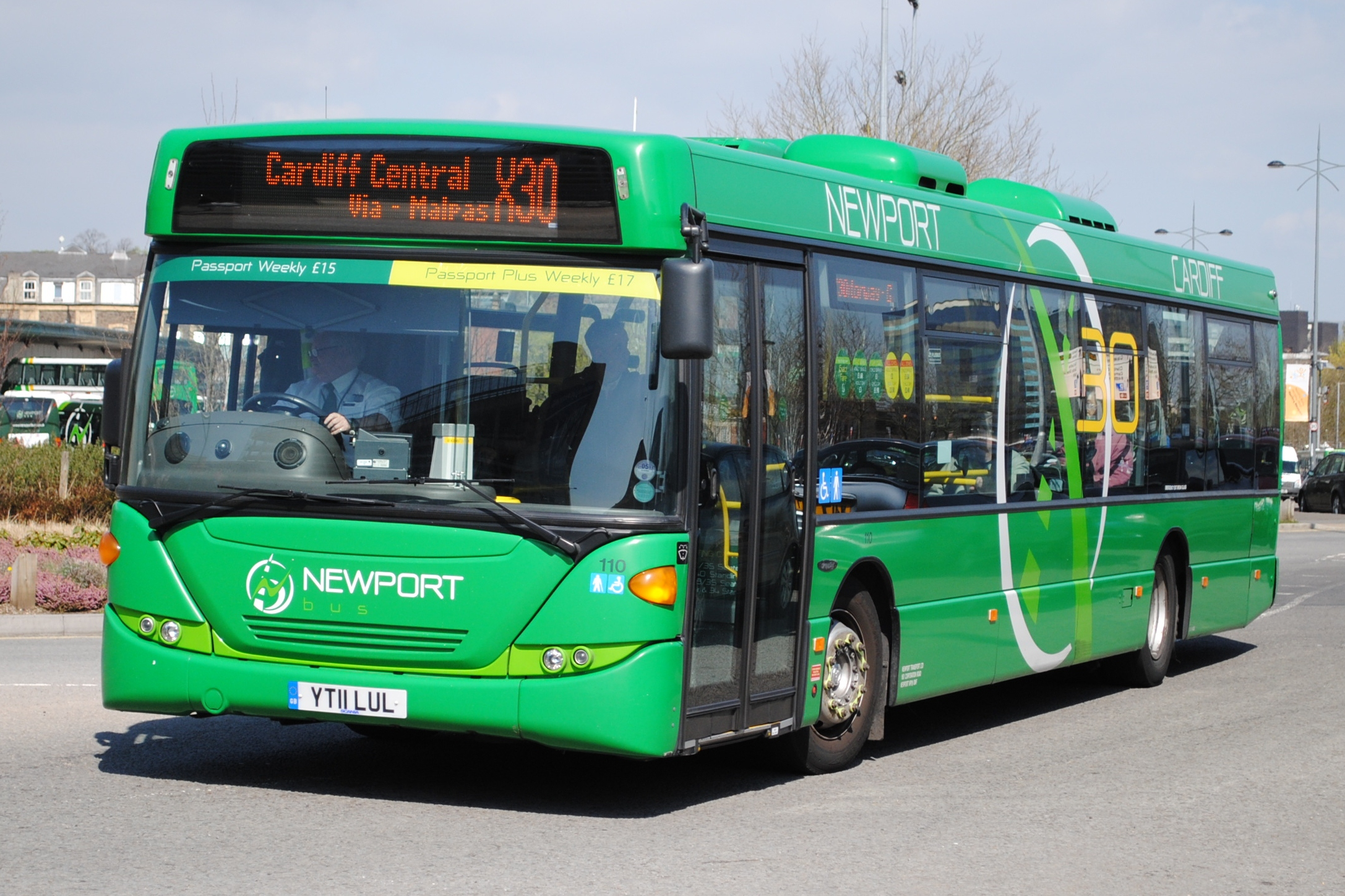
Scania OmniCity at Newport bus station May 2013

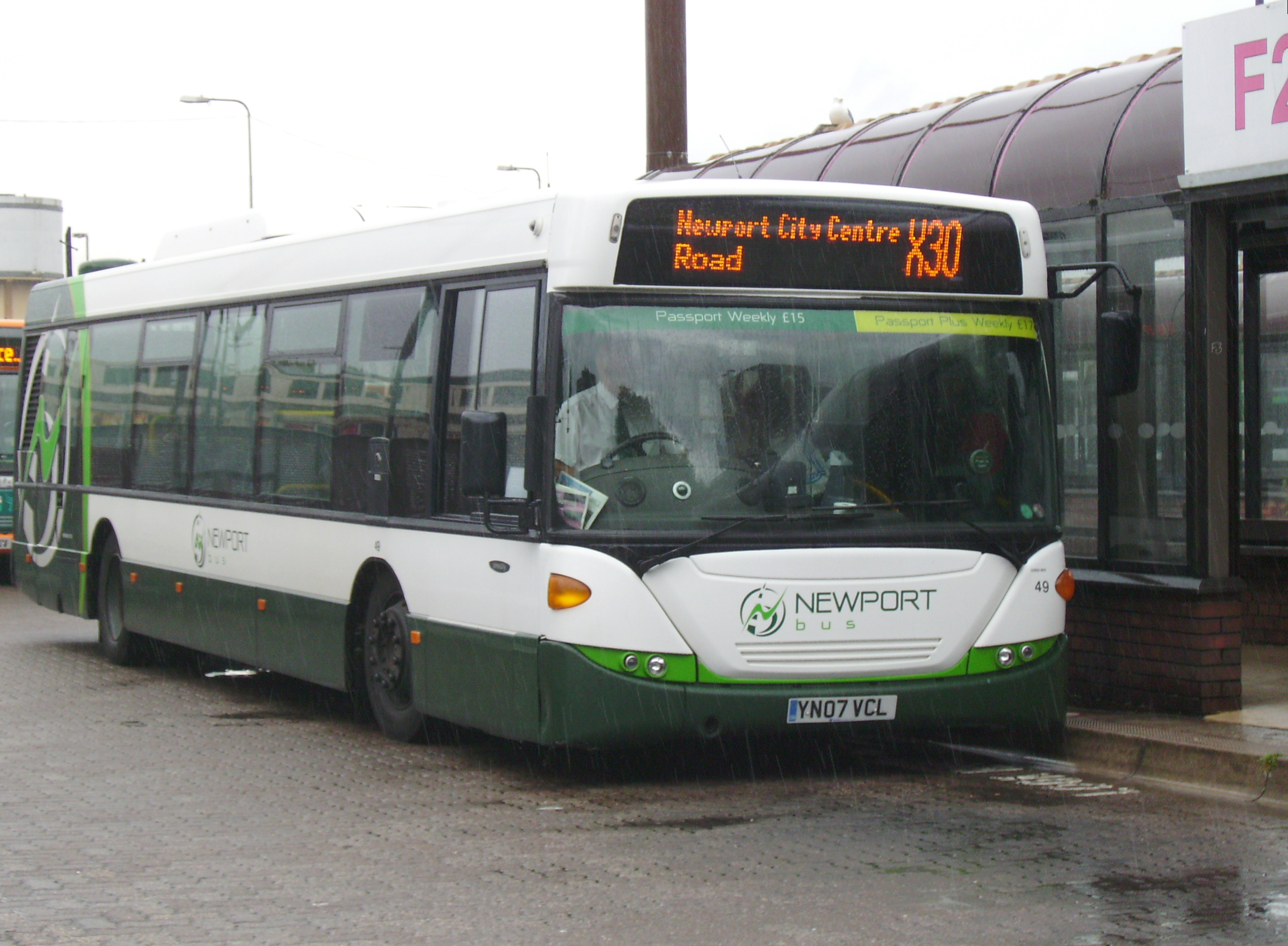
Scania OmniCity at Cardiff Central bus station in May 2014
