= Volvo Olympian =

Step-entrance double-decker bus chassis

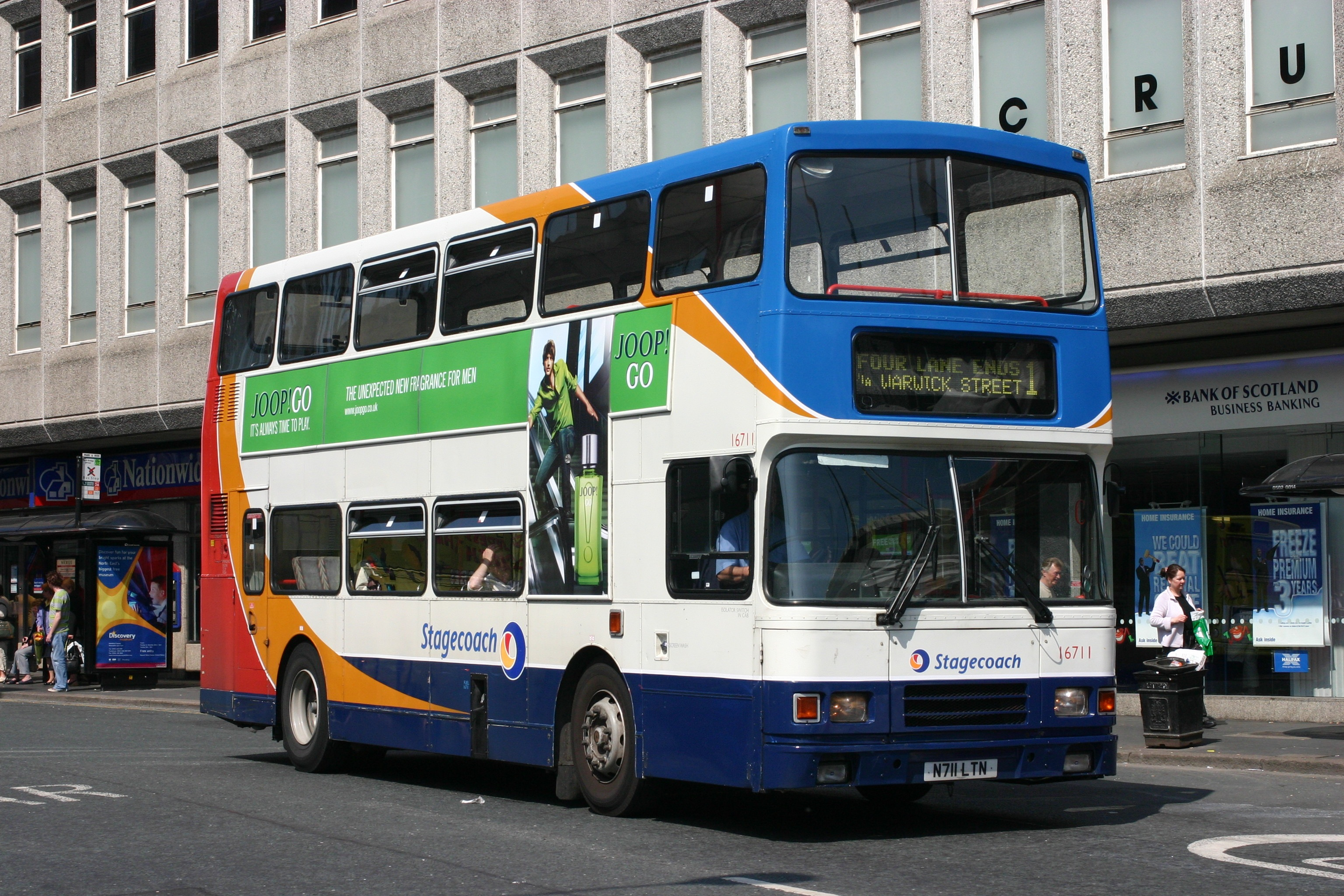
- Stagecoach North East Alexander RL bodied Volvo Olympian in Newcastle upon Tyne in June 2007

Overview
- Manufacturer: Volvo
- Production: 1993–2000
- Assembly: Irvine, North Ayrshire, Scotland

Body and chassis
- Doors: 1, 2, or 3
- Floor type: Step entrance

Powertrain
- Engine: Cummins L10; Volvo TD102KF; Volvo D10A-245
- Power output: 245 hp (183 kW) (Volvo); 215 / 252 hp (160 / 188 kW) (Cummins)
- Transmission: Voith DIWA; ZF Ecomat

Dimensions
- Length: 2-axle: 9.6 m (31 ft 6 in); 10.3 m (33 ft 9 1/2 in); 3-axle: 10.4 m (34 ft 1 1/2 in); 11.3 m (37 ft 7/8 in); 12 m (39 ft 4 1/2 in)

Chronology
- Predecessor: Leyland Olympian
- Successor: Volvo B7TL (2-Axle); Volvo Super Olympian (3-Axle)

The Volvo Olympian was a rear-engined 2-axle and 3-axle double decker bus chassis manufactured by Volvo at its Irvine, Scotland factory. The first was built in 1993 and entered production in March 1993, replacing the Leyland Olympian.

== Design ==
The design was based on its predecessor, the Leyland Olympian, but the chassis was modified such that only the chassis design and layout remained, with even the grade of steel for the chassis members being changed, Volvo's standard electrical system was used, as well as standard Volvo steering/"Z cam" braking systems. The early Volvo Olympians were offered with Cummins L10 or Volvo TD102KF engine, coupled to Voith DIWA or ZF Ecomat gearbox. From late 1996, only the 9.6-litre Volvo D10A-245 Euro II engine with electronic diesel control was offered.

The Volvo Olympian remained as popular as the Leyland Olympian in the United Kingdom and Ireland. A large number of Olympians were exported to Hong Kong and Singapore; most of them being air-conditioned. Production of Volvo Olympian ended in 2000 and concluded a run of over 10,000 Leyland/Volvo Olympian chassis.

The chassis had two low-floor successors: the 2-axle Volvo B7TL and the 3-axle Volvo Super Olympian. It was intended that the new Volvo B7L chassis would replace the Olympian, however very few two-axle double-deck B7Ls were produced; the Volvo B7TL, launched in 2000, instead carried out the B7L's intended role, remaining in production until 2007.

== Operators ==
=== United Kingdom ===
==== London ====
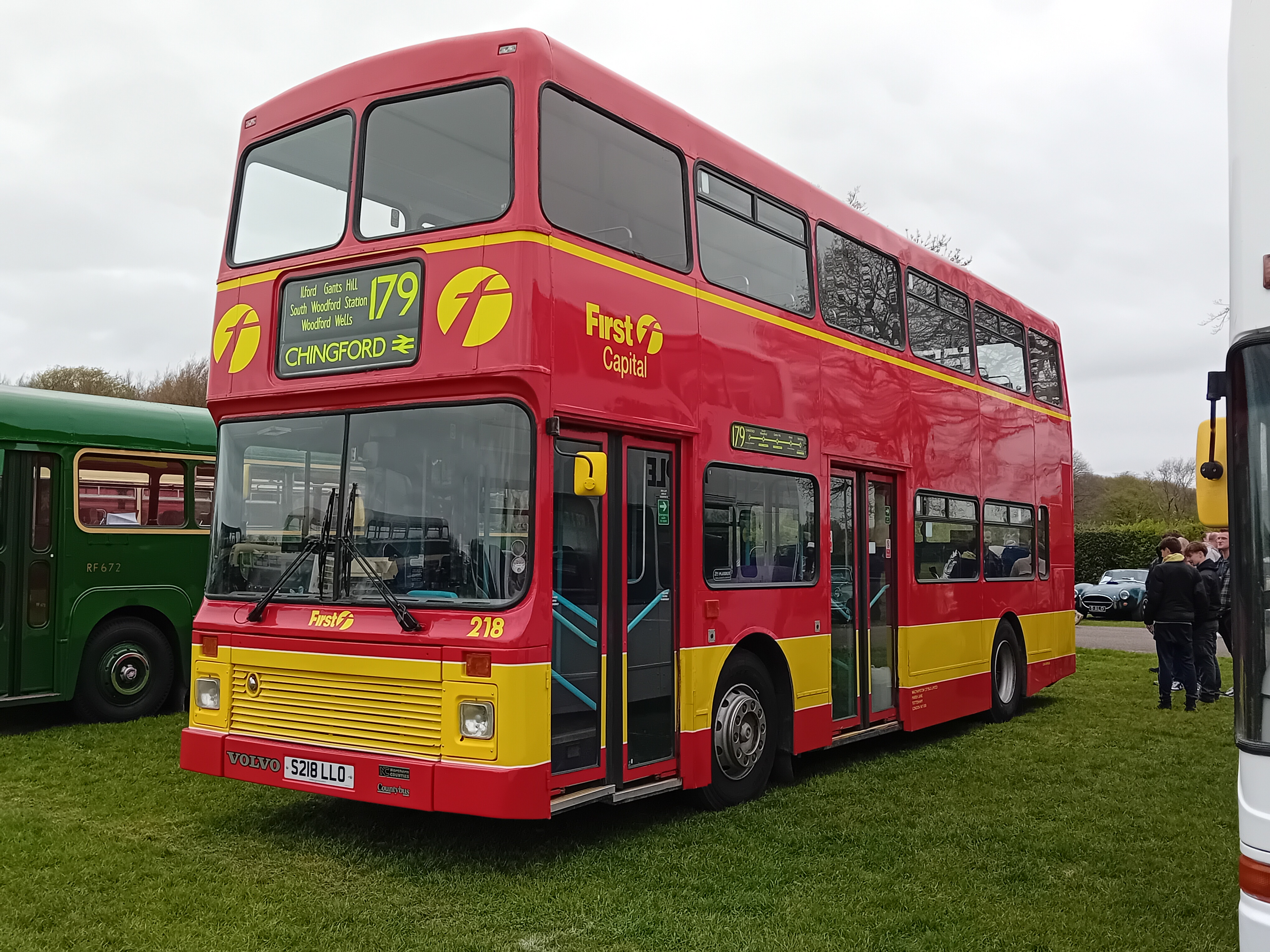
Preserved First Capital Northern Counties Palatine 1 bodied Volvo Olympian in Detling, Kent in April 2026

A total of 746 Volvo Olympians were purchased for services in London mainly by newly privatised operators throughout the chassis' entire production run, carrying on from similar numbers of Leyland Olympians ordered by London Transport. A majority of these were built with Alexander R-Type or Northern Counties Palatine bodies, with smaller numbers built with East Lancs E Type or Pyoneer bodies. The first pre-production Volvo Olympians were delivered with Northern Counties Palatine 2 bodywork to Capital Citybus in October 1993, with further examples with both Palatine 1 and Alexander RH delivered between 1996 and 1997.

Operators of the Volvo Olympian in London included London United, which included a fleet of Alexander Royale bodied Olympians equipped with high-backed seating, air-conditioning and wheelchair lifts for use on Airbus services, Metroline, Stagecoach London's Selkent and East London subsidiaries, London Central, London General, Cowie London, MTL London and CentreWest Buses. Smaller operators within London included Armchair Passenger Transport, Harris Bus, and London Suburban.

==== Outside London ====
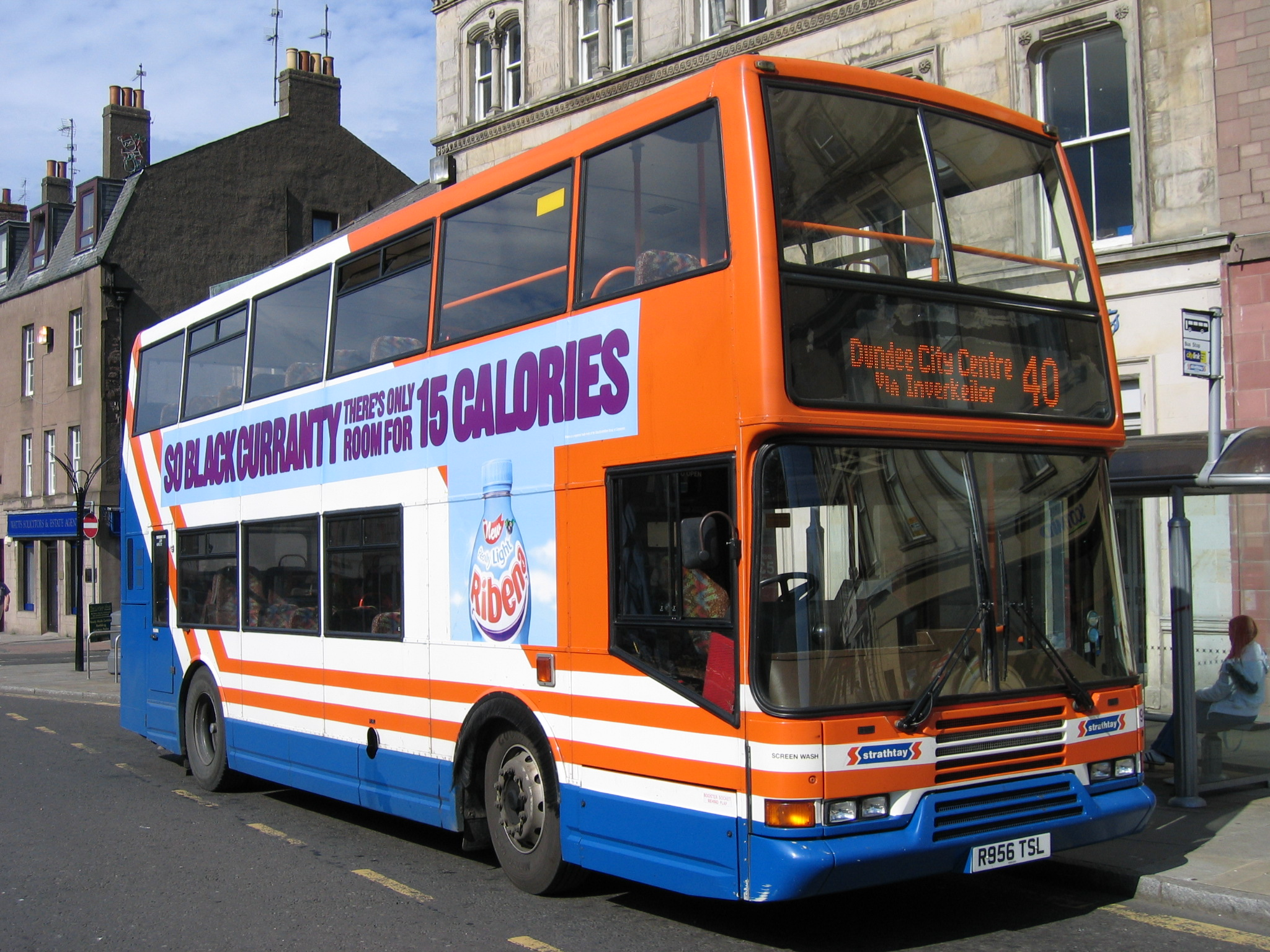
Strathtay Scottish East Lancs Pyoneer bodied Volvo Olympian in Montrose in June 2005

Among the first operators of the Volvo Olympian were Nottingham City Transport, who took delivery of seven with East Lancs E Type during September 1993, two of which were specified with low-height bodies for the South Notts subsidiary. A further 15 were delivered with East Lancs Pyoneer bodies in late 1997.

The Stagecoach Group standardised on the Volvo Olympian with mainly Alexander RL low-height bodywork as the group's standard double-decker bus outside London, with some also built with Northern Counties Palatine bodywork, until production of the Dennis Trident 2 low-floor chassis began in 1999. Various examples to this specification were delivered to its Manchester, Busways, United Counties, A1 Service, Grimsby-Cleethorpes, East Midland, Ribble, Red & White, Transit and Devon subsidiaries, among others.

Other operators who took delivery of Volvo Olympians included the FirstGroup, MTL Trust Holdings, the Blazefield Group's Yorkshire Coastliner and Keighley & District subsidiaries, the Traction Group's Strathtay Scottish and Lincolnshire RoadCar subsidiaries, the Cowie Group and British Bus, who later merged to form Arriva, East Yorkshire Motor Services and Finglands Coachways, Lothian Regional Transport, Kelvin Central Buses and Strathclyde Buses.

=== Ireland ===
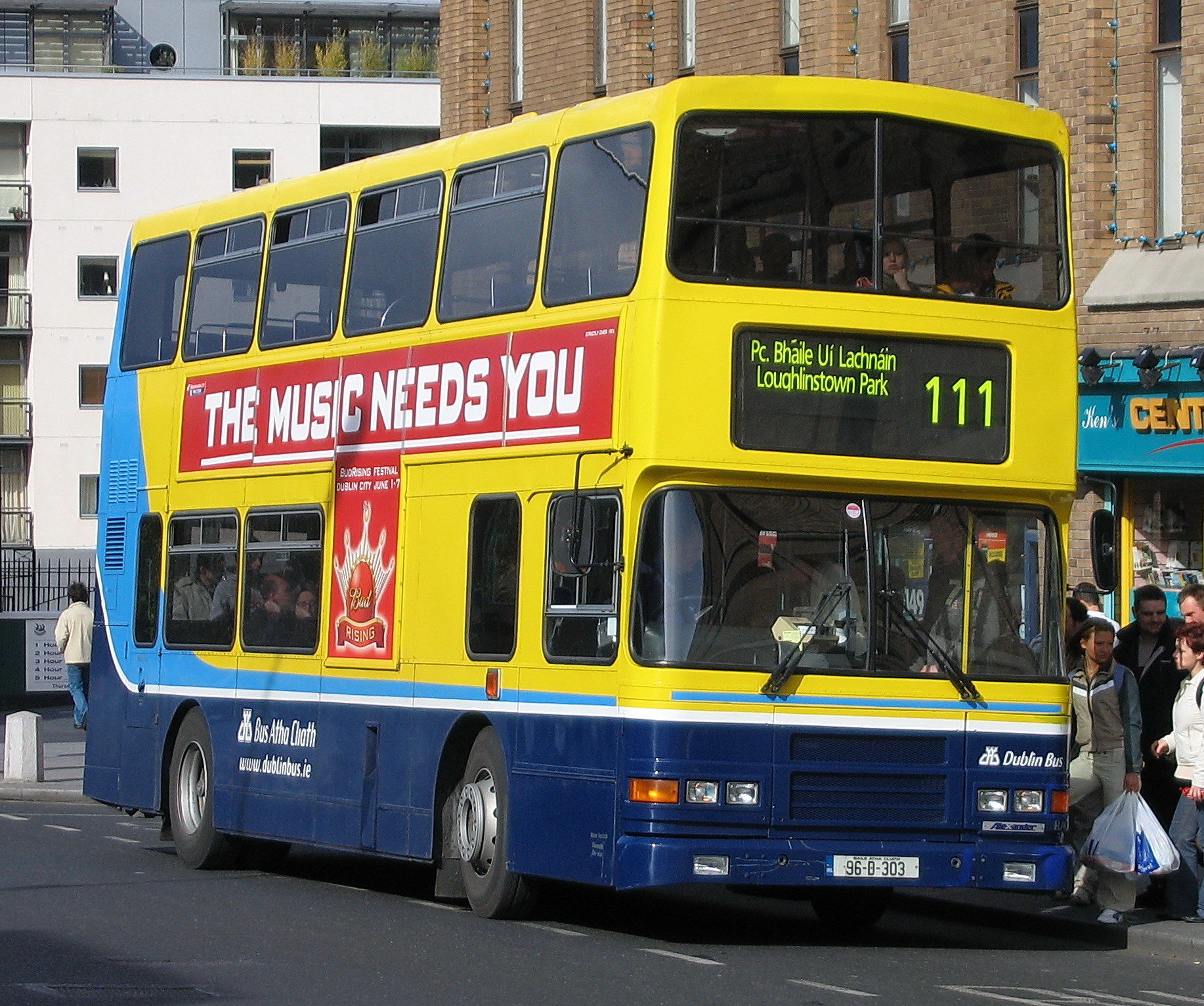
Dublin Bus RA-class Alexander (Belfast) bodied Volvo Olympian in Dún Laoghaire in May 2005

Dublin Bus continued their Alexander (Belfast) bodied Olympian orders with the RA batch on the Leyland chassis being ordered first (RA176 - RA325), with 150 buses being ordered between 1994 and 1996. From January 1997, Dublin Bus ordered a further 315 Volvo Olympians, which were designated as RV. During that period, new liveries were introduced, such as CitySwift and the switch of the core livery from two-tone green and orange to white, blue and orange. All Volvo Olympians were withdrawn by the end of 2012.

=== Hong Kong ===
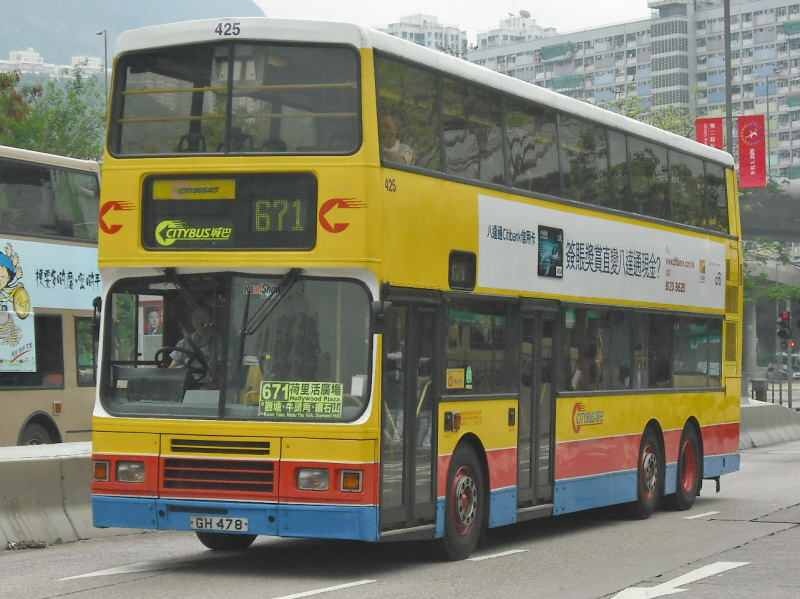
Citybus Volvo Olympian in Hong Kong in May 2009

Kowloon Motor Bus (KMB) took delivery of 531 11-metre Volvo Olympians, 338 12-metre Olympians and 30 non-air-conditioned Olympians between 1994 and 1999. Long Win sold ten 12-metre Olympians to KMB in 1999.

Citybus took delivery of ten 10.4-metre Volvo Olympians, two 12-metre Olympians second hand from China Light & Power, 310 12-metre Olympians and 142 11-metre Olympians, two purchased second-hand from China Motor Bus, between 1994 and 1998.

China Motor Bus took delivery of 64 Volvo Olympians between 1996 and 1998. 62 were sold to New World First Bus in 1998 and five of them were converted to open-top for Rickshaw Sightseeing Bus. New World First Bus received two 12-metre Volvo Olympians from HACTL in 1999 and ten from Citybus in 2014.

=== Singapore ===
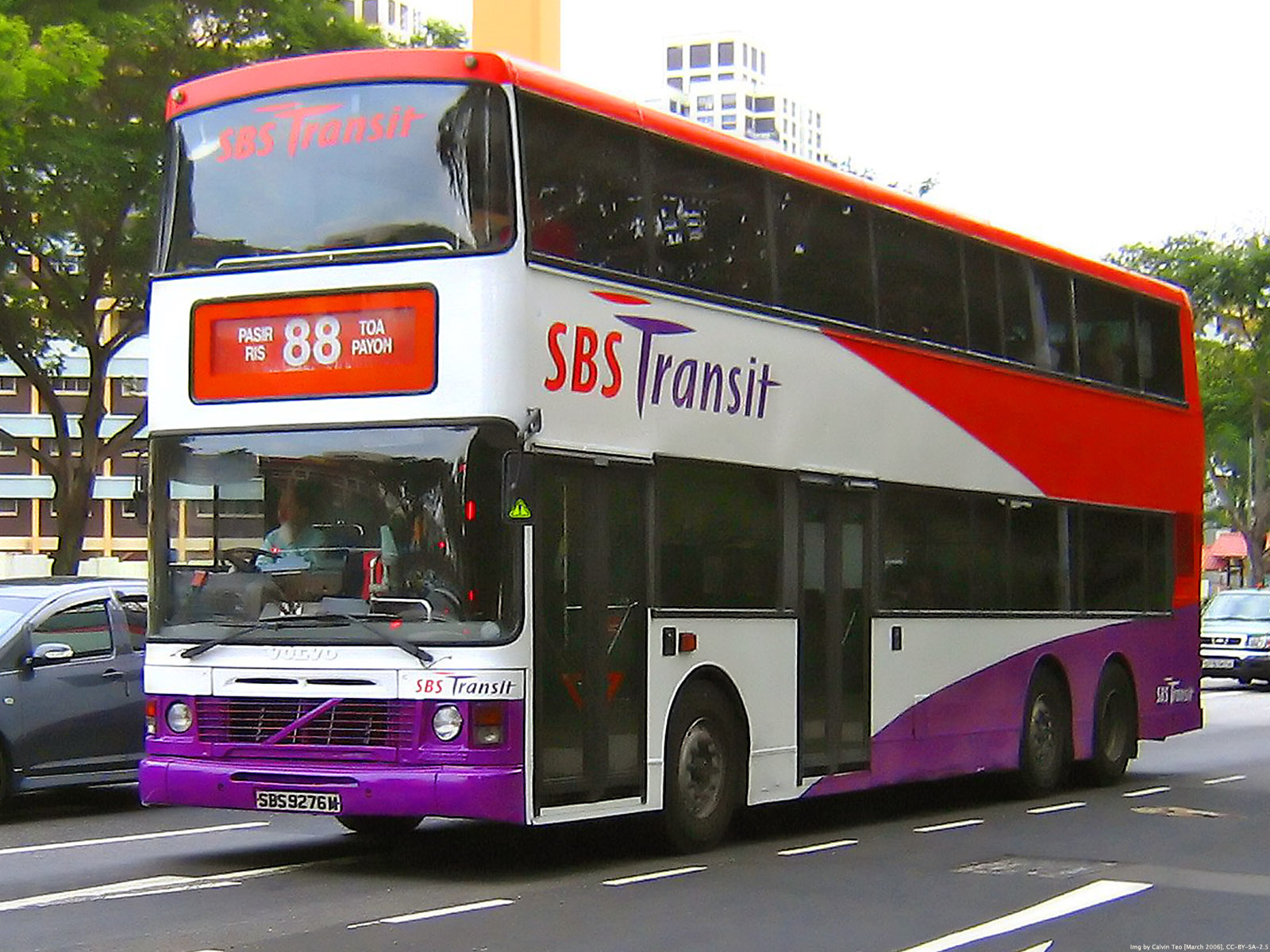
SBS Transit Alexander bodied Volvo Olympian in Singapore in April 2006

In 1993, Singapore Bus Services (SBS) ordered 301 Volvo Olympians, 201 of which were tri-axle air-conditioned models and the remaining 100 being conventional 2-axle models to replace the existing fleet of Leyland Atlanteans. These Volvo Olympians were delivered between June 1994 and June 1995. The 2-axle Volvo Olympians were the last non-air conditioned buses to delivered in Singapore - due to the additional weight of an air compressor necessitating a third axle, these were unable to be retrofitted with air-conditioning - and also were the last 2-axle double-decker public buses in Singapore. These Olympians were equipped with a Euro I Volvo TD102KF engine coupled with a Voith DIWA 851.2 gearbox.

The first batch of tri-axle Volvo Olympians were largely similar in appearance to their Leyland countparts, except for some minor technical differences. In 1996, SBS ordered a second batch of 200 tri-axle Volvo Olympians to replace some of the then-retiring Mercedes-Benz O305s and Leyland Atlanteans, which were delivered between August 1996 and February 1998. A final batch of 70 tri-axle Olympians with Alexander Royale were delivered between March 1999 and December 2000. All tri-axle Olympians were fitted with a ZF Ecomat 4HP500 4-speed automatic transmission.

In April 2000, two SBS Alexander Royale-bodied 2-axle Volvo Olympians were exported to the United Kingdom, with one delivered to First PMT and the other to Metroline, who had recently been purchased by Singaporean transport group ComfortDelGro. Metroline replaced the Singapore-specification windows and doors with British standard products before putting it into revenue-earning service in London, intending it to be the first of a large intake of ex-SBS Olympians into the Metroline fleet.
