= East Lancs Pyoneer =

Double-decker bus body on Volvo and Dennis chassis

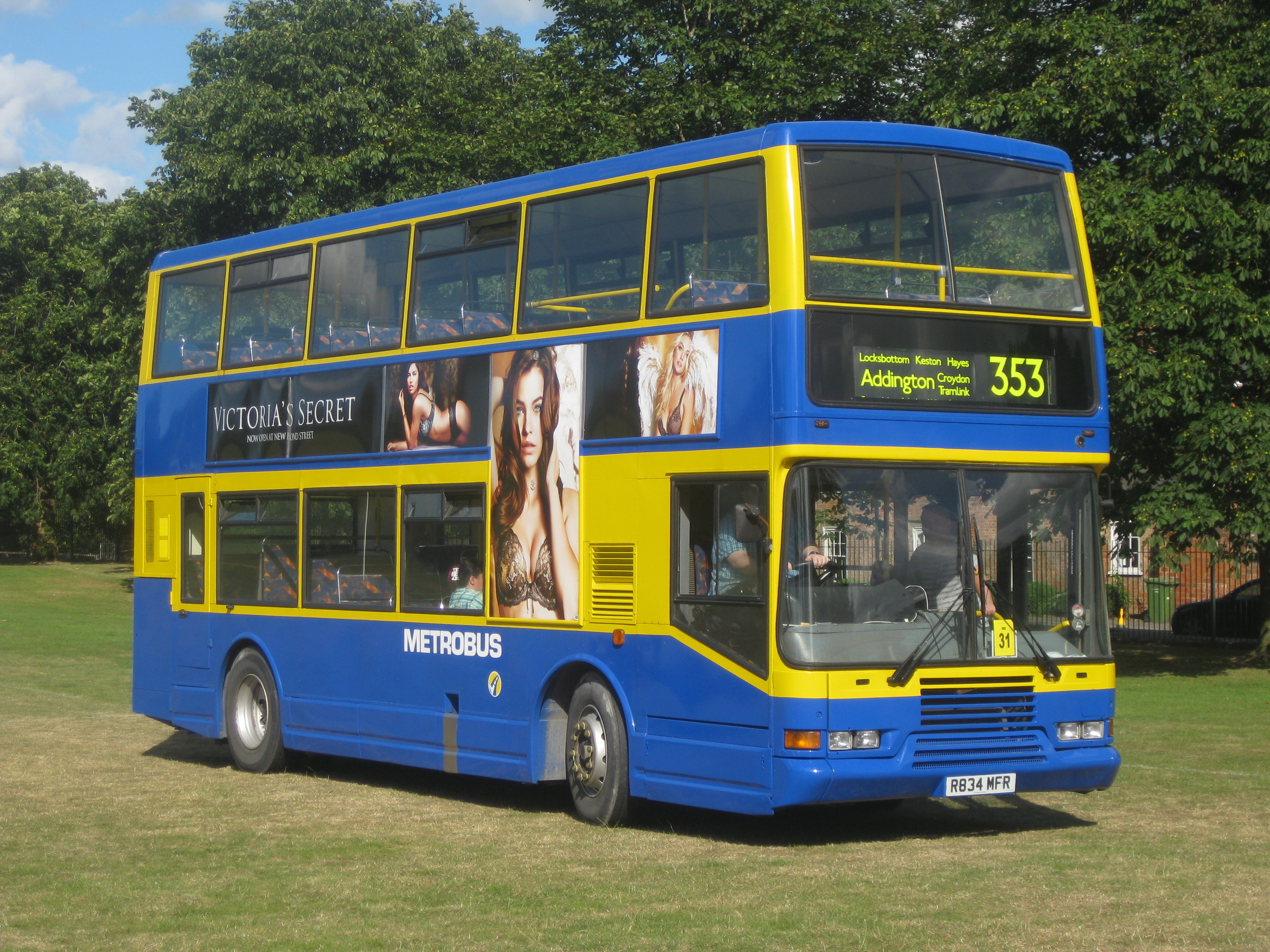
- Preserved Metrobus East Lancs Pyoneer bodied Volvo Olympian in July 2015

Overview
- Manufacturer: East Lancashire Coachbuilders
- Production: 1997-2002

Body and chassis
- Doors: 1 or 2 door
- Floor type: Step entrance
- Chassis: Volvo Olympian; Dennis Arrow; Volvo B10M

Powertrain
- Engine: Cummins C-series (Dennis Arrow); Volvo D10A-245 (Volvo Olympian)

Chronology
- Predecessor: East Lancs E Type; East Lancs Cityzen
- Successor: East Lancs Lolyne; East Lancs Vyking

The East Lancs Pyoneer is a type of step entrance double-decker bus body built on the Volvo Olympian, Dennis Arrow and Volvo B10M by East Lancashire Coachbuilders. The name continues the pattern of using 'misspelt' product names, started by the Cityzen.

== Design ==
Launched in early 1997, the East Lancs Pyoneer was introduced on Volvo and Dennis chassis complement the earlier Cityzen, using a steel-framed structure and sharing styling aspects and components with East Lancs' single-deck Spryte and Flyte. Originally, the Pyoneer was intended to be called the Premyer, however as Plaxton objected to the name due to it clashing with their flagship Premiere coach body, in June 1997, East Lancs launched a competition for Coach & Bus Week readers to suggest new names for the body, with the winning name being Pyoneer.

== Operators ==
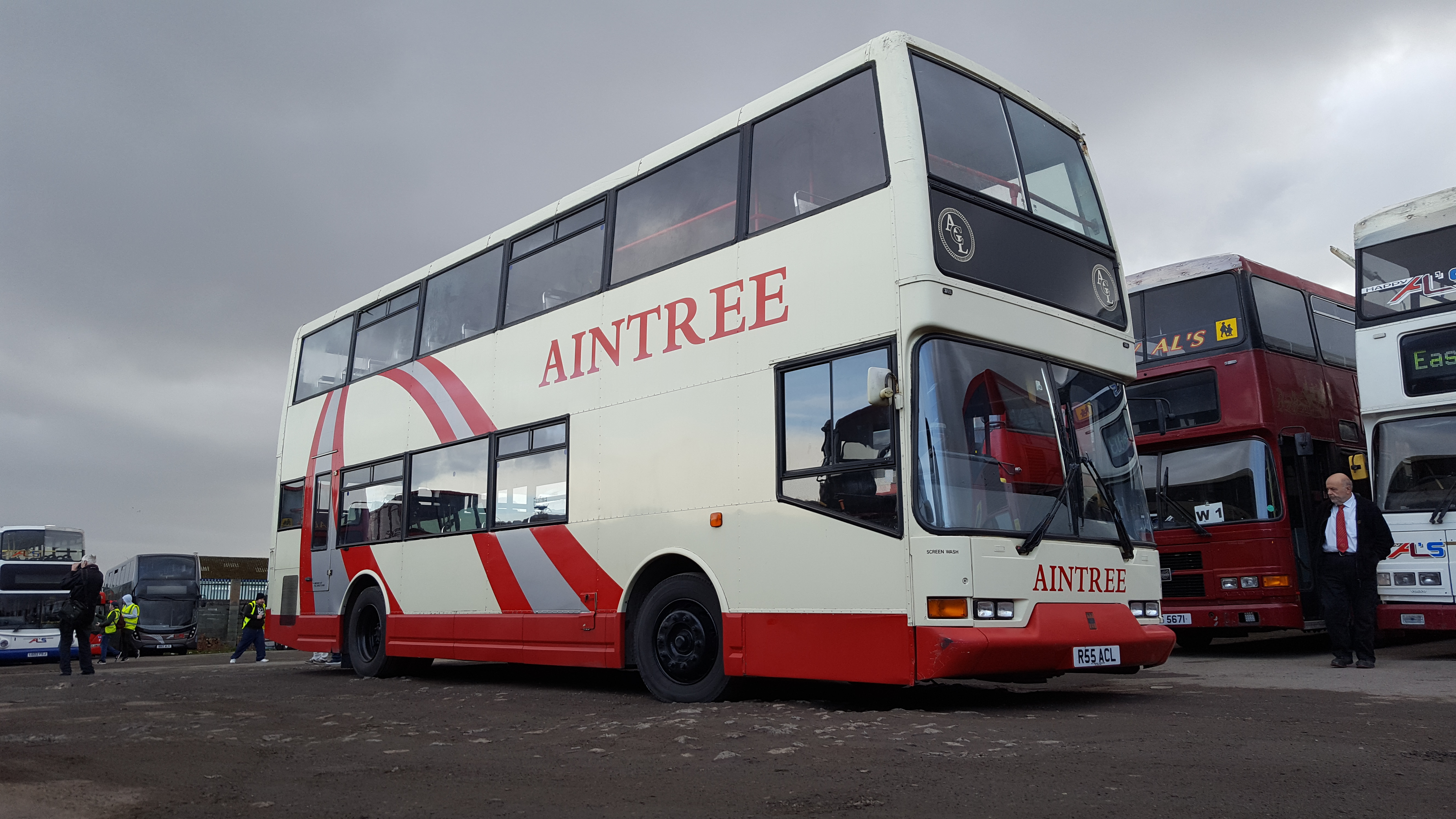
Aintree Coachline East Lancs Pyoneer bodied Dennis Arrow in November 2017

The largest operator of East Lancs Pyoneers was Nottingham City Transport, who took delivery of 42 Pyoneers between 1998 and 2002, predominantly built on Volvo Olympian chassis; of these, Nottingham took delivery ten Pyoneers on Volvo B10M chassis in 1998, taking delivery of another in 2002 as both the last Pyoneer body produced as well as the last step-entrance double-decker to enter service in Britain.

Two other major operators of Pyoneers on Volvo Olympian chassis were Metrobus of Orpington and Harris Bus, both of which were operators of tendered London Regional Transport (LRT) bus services. Harris Bus initially took delivery of 22 Pyoneers for a range of its LRT tendered services, having a further 13 delivered in early 1998, while Metrobus took delivery of fifteen Pyoneers for use on route 64 in 1997.

The Pyoneer body was one of only three that were built on the short-lived Dennis Arrow chassis, the other being East Lancs' EL2000 body and the Northern Counties Palatine II. Of 41 produced, all but three Pyoneers on Dennis Arrow chassis were delivered to Capital Citybus. One of the remaining three Arrows was delivered to Aintree Coachline, another delivered to London Traveller, and the remaining Arrow was purchased for conversion into a playbus.

Pyoneers were also popular with the Traction Group companies, already a major purchaser of East Lancs products. During 1998, eight Pyoneer-bodied short-wheelbase Volvo Olympians were delivered to Strathtay Scottish, with an additional two long-wheelbase examples delivered to Lincolnshire RoadCar for use on a service between Lincoln and Skegness.

Smaller operators of Pyoneers included Blue Bus of Bolton, taking five on Volvo Olympian chassis between 1998 and 1999.

=== Rebodies ===
Six Pyoneers were constructed as rebodies of coach-bodied Volvo B10Ms. Four of these were delivered to Dunn-Line of Nottingham between 1997 and 1998, one was delivered to First Northampton in 1998, and another was delivered to Rodger's of Weldon that same year.

=== Open-top exports ===
Open-top left-hand drive Pyoneers on Volvo B10M chassis were supplied to the Cityrama sightseeing company in Paris, France in 1998, one of which was used to transport the France national football team in a victory parade along the Champs-Élysées following the 1998 FIFA World Cup final, resulting in a further six being ordered by Cityrama.
