= Droop nose =

Droop nose may refer to:

- Droop nose (aeronautics), a component of some supersonic aircraft
- Leading-edge droop flap, a type of high-lift device found on the wings of some aircraft
- East Lancs 1984-style double-deck body, a bus body known as "Droop Nose"
