= Strathtay Scottish =

Bus operator in East Scotland

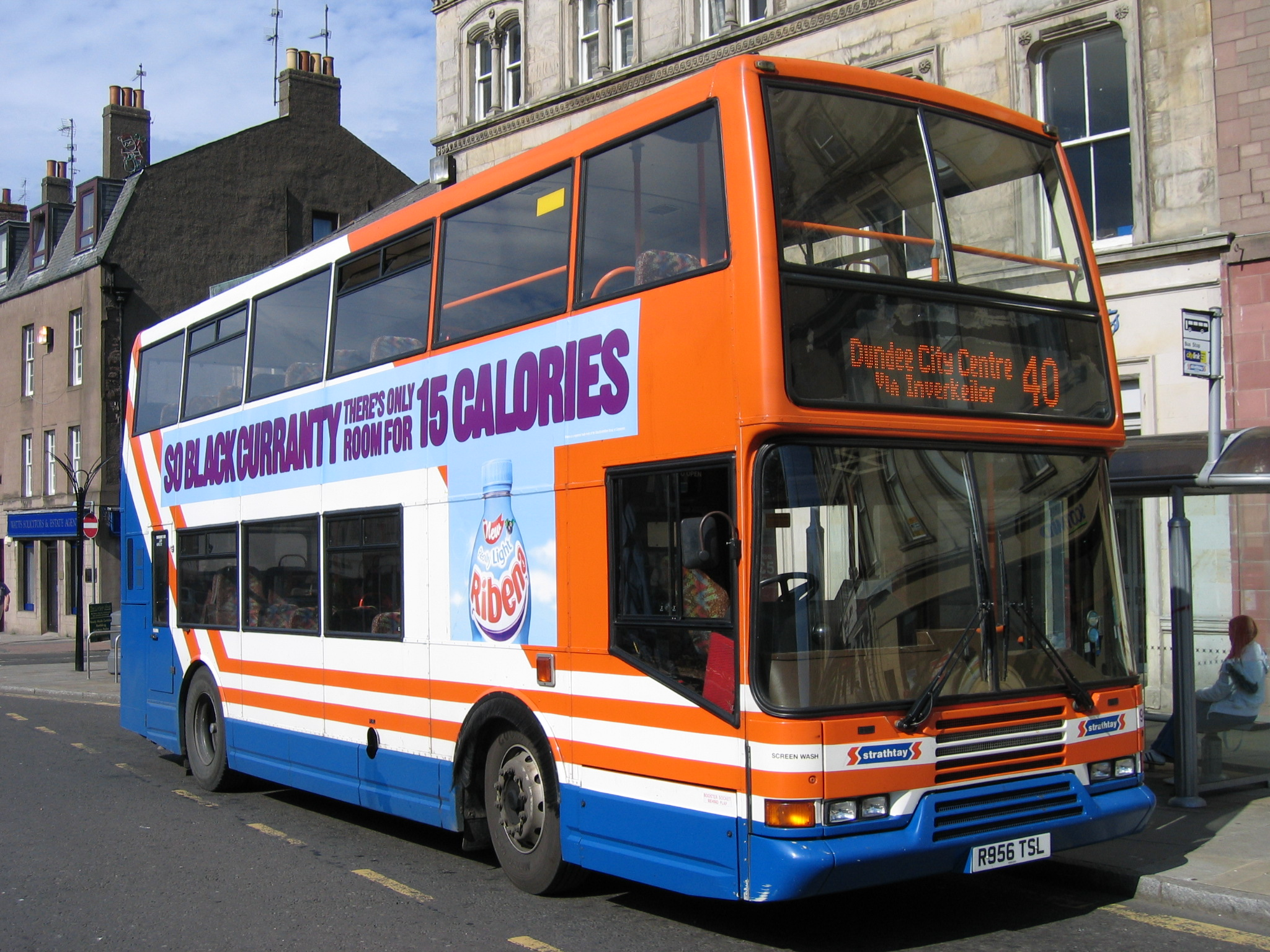
- Strathtay East Lancs Pyoneer bodied Volvo Olympian in Montrose in June 2005
- Parent: Traction Group
- Founded: March 1985; 41 years ago
- Defunct: 14 December 2005; 20 years ago
- Headquarters: Dunfermline, Fife
- Locale: Dundee; Arbroath; Blairgowrie; Forfar; Montrose
- Depots: 7 (May 1991)
- Fleet: 164 (May 1991)

Strathtay Scottish was a bus operator running services in Dundee, Angus and parts of Grampian in eastern Scotland. Formed in 1985 ahead of bus deregulation as a subsidiary of the Scottish Transport Group from parts of Walter Alexander & Sons (Midland) Ltd and Walter Alexander & Sons (Northern) Ltd., Strathtay was purchased by the Traction Group in 1991 and operated as a subsidiary of the company until 2005, when parent company Yorkshire Traction was purchased by the Stagecoach Group. The company today trades as part of Stagecoach South Scotland.

== History ==
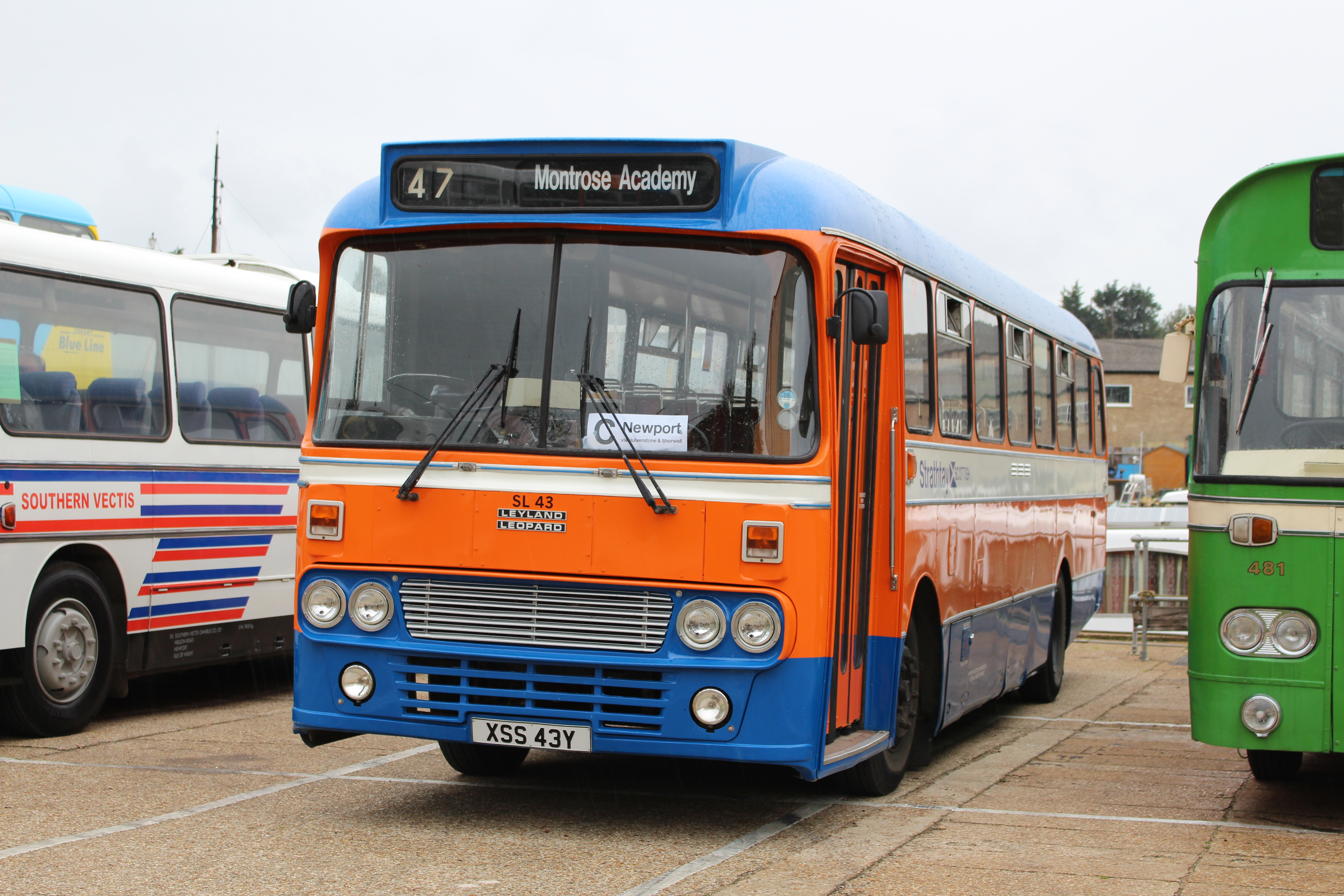
Preserved Strathtay Scottish Alexander Y Type bodied Leyland Leopard in Scottish Bus Group livery

Strathtay Scottish was one of four new companies created through the reorganisation of the Scottish Bus Group (SBG) in preparation for the deregulation of the bus industry on 26 October 1986, which ultimately saw the break-up of the SBG. Strathtay inherited the eastern operations of W. Alexander & Sons (Midland) based in Perth, Crieff and Pitlochry, as well as the southern operations of W. Alexander (Northern) in Dundee, Forfar, Arbroath, Blairgowrie and Montrose. A bright blue and orange livery was adopted for the fleet, which was controlled from Dundee.

The company had a turbulent infancy, facing very heavy competition from Perth-based operator Stagecoach, who engaged in a bus war with Strathtay Scottish between 1989 and 1991. After managing director Neil Renilson had resigned from Strathtay Scottish to join Stagecoach ahead of the company's commencement of Perth services on 19 June 1989, Strathtay Scottish purchased a number of ex-London Transport AEC Routemaster buses to compete with Stagecoach, which also used a number of the same vehicle type on city services in Perth. A new Perth City Transport brand was created by Strathtay Scottish to compete with Stagecoach, with buses painted in a red and white livery. As Stagecoach grew nationally, it became financially stronger and had ready access to vehicles from the larger companies in England it had purchased; Strathtay Scottish, meanwhile, was ultimately unable to sustain the level of intense competition that ensued.

Despite experiencing heavy and sustained competition on its Perth services, Strathtay Scottish managed to remain profitable prior to its privatisation from the Scottish Bus Group. Strathtay workers attempted to carry out a management buyout of the company from the SBG, however they were outbid by Barnsley-based Yorkshire Traction, which Strathtay Scottish was sold to in May 1991 for £1.9 million (equivalent to £4,370,000 in 2025). As a subsidiary of the Traction Group, the company was renamed to Strathtay Buses, with the new owners establishing and maintaining a working relationship with Stagecoach around Perth, jointly operating the trunk service between Dundee and Perth with the national operator. The remainder of the operations remained largely unchanged from privatisation, however Crieff and Pitlochry depots closed during 1991 as a result of Stagecoach's prior competition, resulting in Strathtay withdrawing from the majority of services around both towns, followed by Strathtay closing its Perth depot in 1993, resulting in bus services in the city being entirely operated by Stagecoach.

On 14 December 2005, the Traction Group was purchased by Stagecoach for £26 million (equivalent to £45,979,000 in 2025), resulting in Strathtay becoming a subsidiary of Stagecoach East Scotland. Buses were initially branded with modified Strathtay fleetnames on top of standard fleet livery, however the fleet was later rebranded to 'Stagecoach in Strathtay', using conventional Stagecoach fleetnames.
