= Northern Counties Palatine =

Step-entrance double-decker bus body

Northern Counties Palatine Northern Counties Countybus
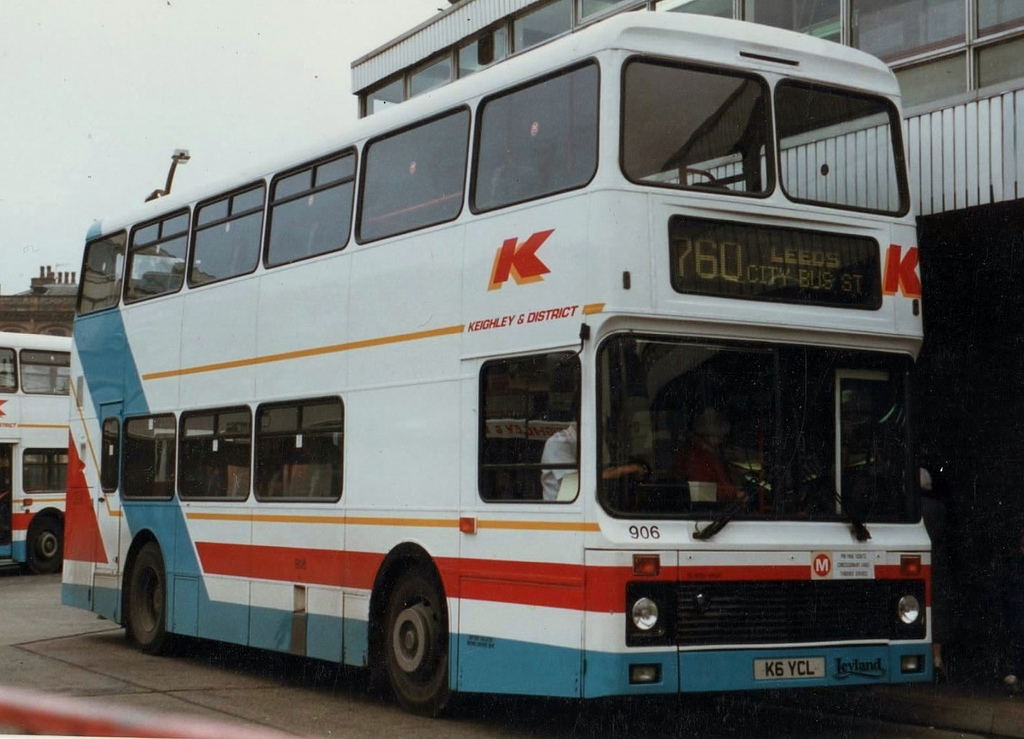
- Keighley & District Northern Counties Palatine bodied Leyland Olympian

Overview
- Manufacturer: Northern Counties
- Production: 1988 - 1998 (Palatine I); 1993 - 1999 (Palatine II)
- Assembly: Wigan, Greater Manchester, England

Body and chassis
- Doors: 1 or 2
- Floor type: Step entrance
- Chassis: DAF DB250; Dennis Arrow; Dennis Dominator; Leyland Olympian; Scania N113; Volvo Citybus (D10M); Volvo Olympian

Chronology
- Successor: Plaxton President

The Northern Counties Palatine was a step-entrance 2-axle and 3-axle double-decker bus body built by Northern Counties from 1988 to 1999 in Wigan, England. The Palatine was built mainly on Leyland Olympian and Volvo Olympian chassis, although smaller sized orders were also built for customers on DAF DB250, Dennis Arrow, Dennis Dominator, Volvo B10M Citybus and Scania N113DRB chassis.

== Design ==
Initially marketed as the Countybus in line with other Northern Counties bus bodies in production at the time, the Northern Counties Palatine was launched in October 1988 as a redesign of Northern Counties' standard double-decker bus bodywork. Available in both full-height and low-height form, the new design featured a revised front end with an arched roof dome, concealed windscreen wipers, squared headlight clusters and a rectangular front grille.

The second-generation Northern Counties Palatine II was launched in 1993. Visually similar in design to its competitor, the Optare Spectra, the Palatine II had a revised front fascia which also featured a curved windscreen and a rounded roofline, sharing similar design cues with the single-decker Northern Counties Paladin; wider and deeper windows and more interior headroom. The first-generation 'Countybus' was renamed 'Palatine' and continued to be sold alongside the Palatine II as a low-cost alternative.

== Operators ==
=== Palatine I/Countybus ===
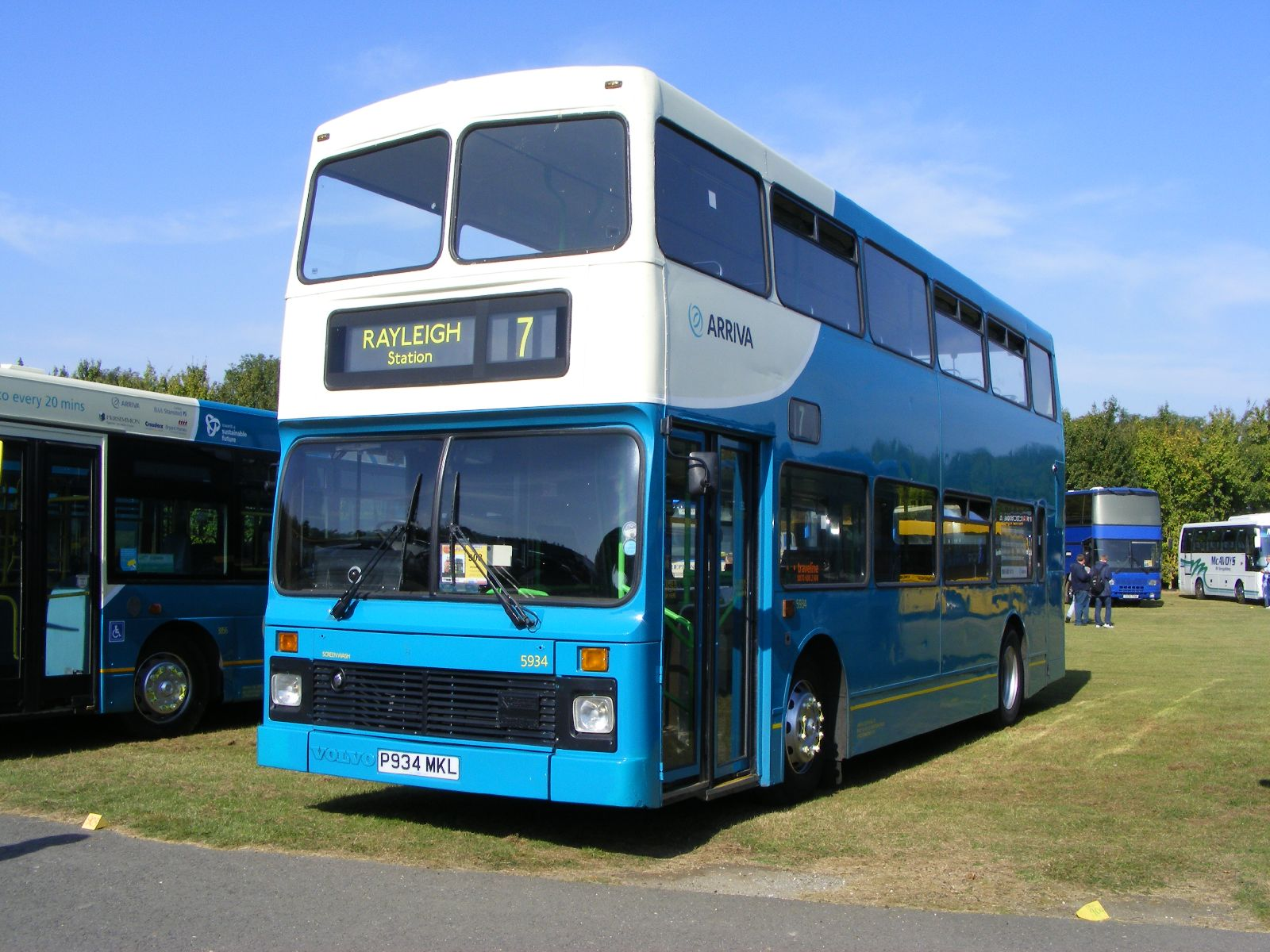
Arriva Southern Counties Northern Counties Palatine I bodied Volvo Olympian in 2009

The Palatine proved popular with bus operators in London, with the biggest operators being Go-Ahead Group subsidiaries London General and London Central, who purchased a total of 159 Palatines on Volvo Olympian chassis. Stagecoach Holdings' London subsidiaries Selkent and East London also took delivery of a total of 166 Palatines on Volvo Olympian chassis, dual-sourcing the bodies alongside similar buses fitted with Alexander bodywork. Ensignbus took delivery of separate fleets of Northern Counties Palatines on Dennis Dominator chassis between 1989 and 1990 for use on its London Pride Sightseeing operation and London Regional Transport service contracts respectively; successor company Capital Citybus took delivery of further Palatines on both Dennis Dominator and Volvo Olympian chassis between 1992 and 1996.

Prior to the introduction of the Volvo Olympian, Palatines could be bodied on the mid-engined Volvo Citybus chassis, a double-decker variant of the existing Volvo B10M chassis internally codenamed 'D10M'. Operators of Palatines on Volvo Citybus chassis included London General, who took delivery of 38 between 1989 and 1990, GM Buses, who took delivery of ten in 1992, two of which were uniquely equipped with wheelchair lifts, Drawlane Group operator London & Country, who took delivery of 25 during 1989, Go Whippet, and Southdown Motor Services.

Outside London, the Palatine proved popular with former PTE operations Yorkshire Rider, Busways Travel, Merseybus and GM Buses, who each purchased Palatines on both Leyland and Volvo Olympian chassis, as well as some on Scania N113 chassis. The Drawlane Group and its successor British Bus also purchased a significant amount of Palatines on Leyland and Volvo Olympian chassis, with subsidiaries Maidstone & District, Kentish Bus, Midland Fox, Southend Transport and West Riding Buses making up the majority of orders. Badgerline Group subsidiary Bristol Cityline, meanwhile, took delivery of 30 Leyland Olympians with Palatine I bodies in 1992.

East Yorkshire Motor Services took delivery of 59 Leyland and Volvo Olympians with Palatine I bodies between 1990 and 1998 to replace former National Bus Company buses, with five additionally delivered to their Finglands Coachways subsidiary in Manchester. Thirteen Leyland Olympians with Palatine I bodies were delivered to Isle of Man Transport between 1989 and early 1990, while Blazefield Holdings subsidiaries Keighley & District and Yorkshire Coastliner also purchased Palatines on Volvo Olympian chassis. Five Palatine-bodied Volvo Olympians built to Stagecoach specification were delivered to Cleveland Transit in 1994, with three more also delivered to their subsidiary Kingston upon Hull City Transport.

=== Palatine II ===
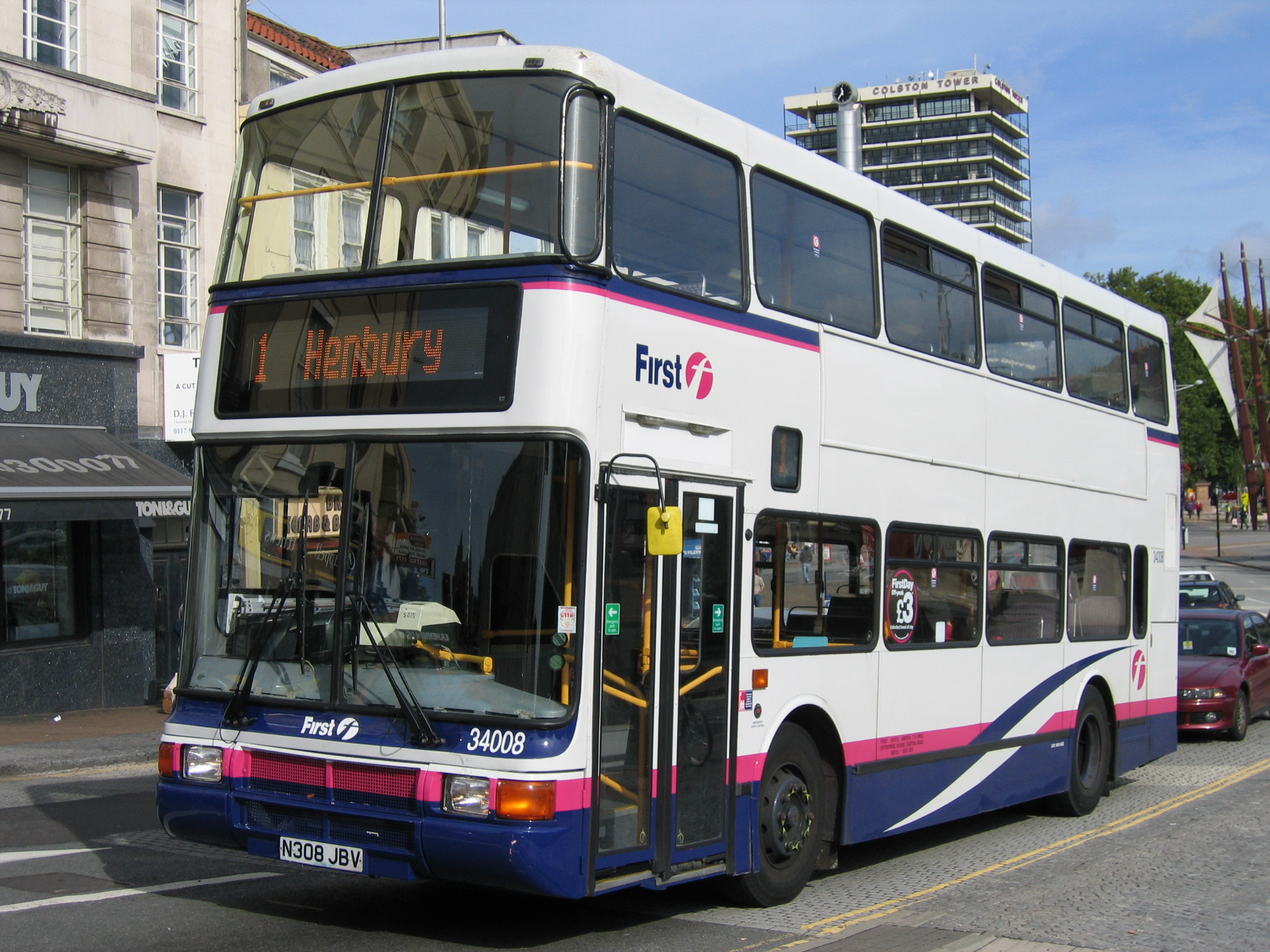
A Volvo Olympian with Northern Counties Palatine II bodywork, operated by First Bristol

MTL Trust Holdings were a notable operator of Palatine IIs, purchasing an initial batch of 36 high-specification Palatine IIs in 1996 for both the 'Silver Service' through the Mersey Tunnels and for the Southport operation. Another batch of 22, branded as 'The Millennium Fleet', entered service in Merseyside in 1998.

In London, the Palatine II proved less popular than the Palatine I. However, Capital Citybus were early adopters of the Palatine II, ordering the only Leyland Olympian to receive a Palatine II body, as well as further examples on the Volvo Olympian and Dennis Arrow chassis. CentreWest Buses purchased 15 Palatine IIs on Volvo Olympian chassis for the 607 Express in 1996, while the Cowie Group purchased 13 Palatines IIs on the DAF DB250 chassis in January 1996, with an additional two being acquired from dealer stock in 1999. Additional Palatine IIs were purchased by London General, who purchased only 27 of the type, Armchair Passenger Transport, Harris Bus and London Suburban.

Other operators of the Palatine II on the Volvo Olympian chassis include Go North East, who purchased a total of 23 in 1997; Northumbria Motor Services, who took 19 between 1994 and 1997; East Yorkshire Motor Services, who took six in 1995, and Eastbourne Buses, who purchased the first Palatine II bodied on DAF DB250 chassis.

== Exports ==
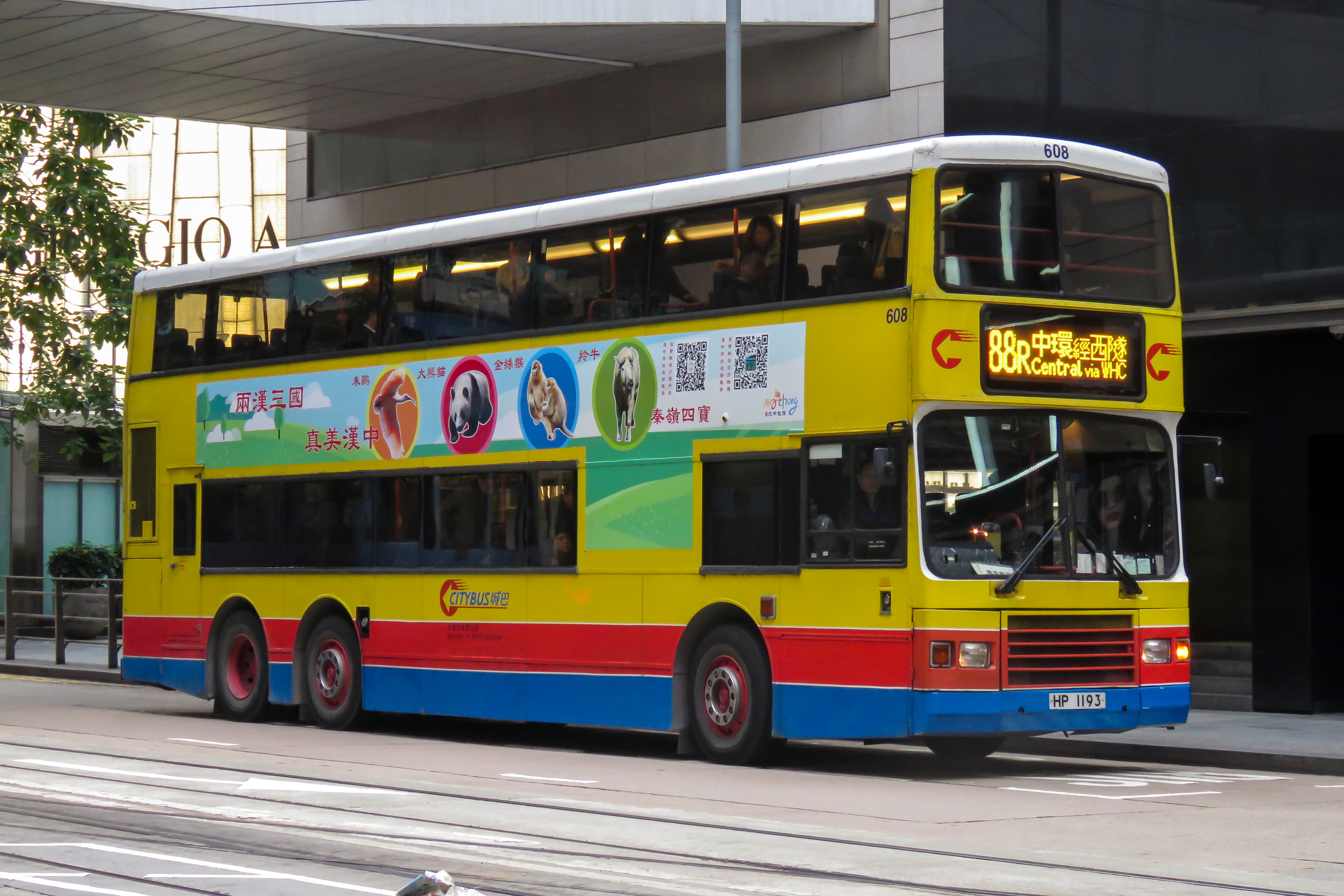
Citybus Northern Counties Palatine bodied Volvo Olympian in Hong Kong in 2018

As a result of high demand for bodies on air-conditioned tri-axle Volvo Olympian chassis outstripping rival manufacturer Alexander's production capacity, between 1996 and 1998, Northern Counties assembled a handful of heavily modified Palatine bodies for export to Hong Kong, which were badged as Plaxtons upon completion.

Citybus took delivery of 55 Northern Counties-bodied Volvo Olympians on 12 metres (39 ft) chassis, which were specified to have Alexander-style front ends and windscreens, while the Kowloon-Canton Railway Corporation received 15 on 11 metres (36 ft) chassis with conventional Northern Counties windscreens. Two 12 metres (39 ft) Northern Counties-bodied Volvo Olympians were also delivered for use as staff shuttle buses by Hong Kong Air Cargo Terminals Limited.
