= Neil Renilson =

Business man and Director of Travel and tourism industry

Neil Renilson (born April 1955 in Edinburgh, Scotland) is a businessman who works in the travel and tourism industry. He has held high-ranking positions at a number of large bus companies including Go-Ahead Group, Stagecoach Group and Lothian Buses, and is currently a director of Jacobite Cruises and City Sightseeing.

== Early life ==
Renilson was born in Edinburgh in 1955, and showed an early interest in public transport: he states that his mother said the second word he spoke was "tam" ( tram ) After leaving school he spent two years as a trainee at what was then Edinburgh Corporation Transport, before taking a degree in transport management and planning at Loughborough University. While there he shared a flat with runner Sebastian Coe.

Renilson joined National Bus Company's graduate training programme in 1977, and on completion moved up their management structure, holding posts at NBC companies United Automobile Services, Yorkshire Traction, City of Oxford Motor Services, United Counties Omnibus, Trent Motor Traction -Area Manager Derbyshire - and Northern General Transport Company - Operations Director.

== Strathtay and Stagecoach ==
Renilson returned to Scotland in 1987 to become the managing director of recently formed Dundee based Scottish Bus Group subsidiary Strathtay Scottish. He stayed at the company for two years before joining Stagecoach Group in 1989.

His move to Stagecoach saw Renilson take over as chairman of the group's operations in Scotland and Africa. A string of improvements in performance culminated in the Aberdeen headquartered Bluebird Buses (now Stagecoach Bluebird) subsidiary coming first at the Bus Industry Awards 1996. He left Stagecoach in 1998 following a management shake-up in which Stagecoach founders Brian Souter and Ann Gloag gave up overall control of the group's bus division.

== Lothian Buses ==
In 1998 it was announced that Renilson would be moving to council-owned Lothian Buses to take over as its chief executive. He took charge in January 1999. He chose his own management team, bringing in a number of his former team from Stagecoach.

Renilson's time at Lothian saw a number of notable successes. A flat fare system was introduced to reduce complexity, three of the company's four garages and works were dramatically improved and updated, and all of the fleet was replaced, with top of the range highly specified vehicles. Passenger numbers increased from 82 million to 114 million per year between 1998 and 2008, and the company was named the best in the UK four times. Following Lothian's victory at the 2007 UK Bus Operator of the Year Awards, Renilson himself was runner-up at the Passenger Transport Professional Awards in 2008.

Despite these successes, Renilson was not popular with a few Lothian staff members, with a group of drivers setting up a website to anonymously criticise him. His tenure saw dramatic modernisation of staff terms and conditions, which was largely achieved without industrial relations problems, but In 2005 a one day strike occurred over pay.

For eight years Renilson was also the managing director of Lothian, but from June 2006 was assisted in this capacity by the appointment of Ian Craig to the newly created post of General Manager, so henceforth Renilson could concentrate on his role as chief executive of the council-owned transport Transport Edinburgh Ltd. the umbrella public transport company for the city This included responsibility for the new Edinburgh Trams development intended to begin operation in 2011. Renilson would later state that following Craig's appointment he had spent about 80% of his time working on the tram project.

In October 2008, following ten years at the company, Renilson announced his intention to take early retirement aged 54.

This followed a difficult financial year in which heavy congestion caused by tram works in Edinburgh city centre led to sharply increased operating costs resulting from the need to deploy 30 additional buses and drivers to maintain services, and to a drop in passenger numbers as passengers avoided the city centre shops due to extensive tram building works and road closures. He stated that he had intended to retire aged 55, but had moved aside early to allow the company time to adjust to his departure before the trams commenced operation. but it was widely believed he left following intense frustration with mismanagement of the tram project by others.

After Renilson announced his retirement, Lothian revealed that the position of chief executive would not be filled immediately, with control instead passing to Craig. This reflected the fact that for the previous 3 years Renilson had been primarily devoting his time to Transport Edinburgh and the tram project

Renilson was paid £324,000 on leaving the company. The level of the payment received some criticism, but was strongly defended by the company with then-chairman Pilmar Smith stating to the press: "During Neil's ten-year tenure at the helm of Lothian Buses he orchestrated constant passenger, revenue and profit growth."

== Post-Lothian ==
In announcing his retirement Renilson also stated that he did not want to continue in bus industry management. Despite this, there were several rumours that Renilson intended to take another job in the industry, with some suggesting that he would be Stagecoach's next UK Bus managing director. All proved to be unfounded.

Renilson joined Inverness-based tourist cruise firm Jacobite Cruises as a non executive director in May 2010, working for the firm on a part-time basis. He had previously worked in the area with Stagecoach Bluebird and was pleased to be able to return, stating that he was "thrilled with the new position". Renilson is also a board member of the South East Scotland Transport Partnership - SESTRAN, City Sightseeing - the operator of open top tour buses, and holds other non executive posts in the travel and tourism businesses.
