= East Lancs E Type =

Double deck bus bodywork

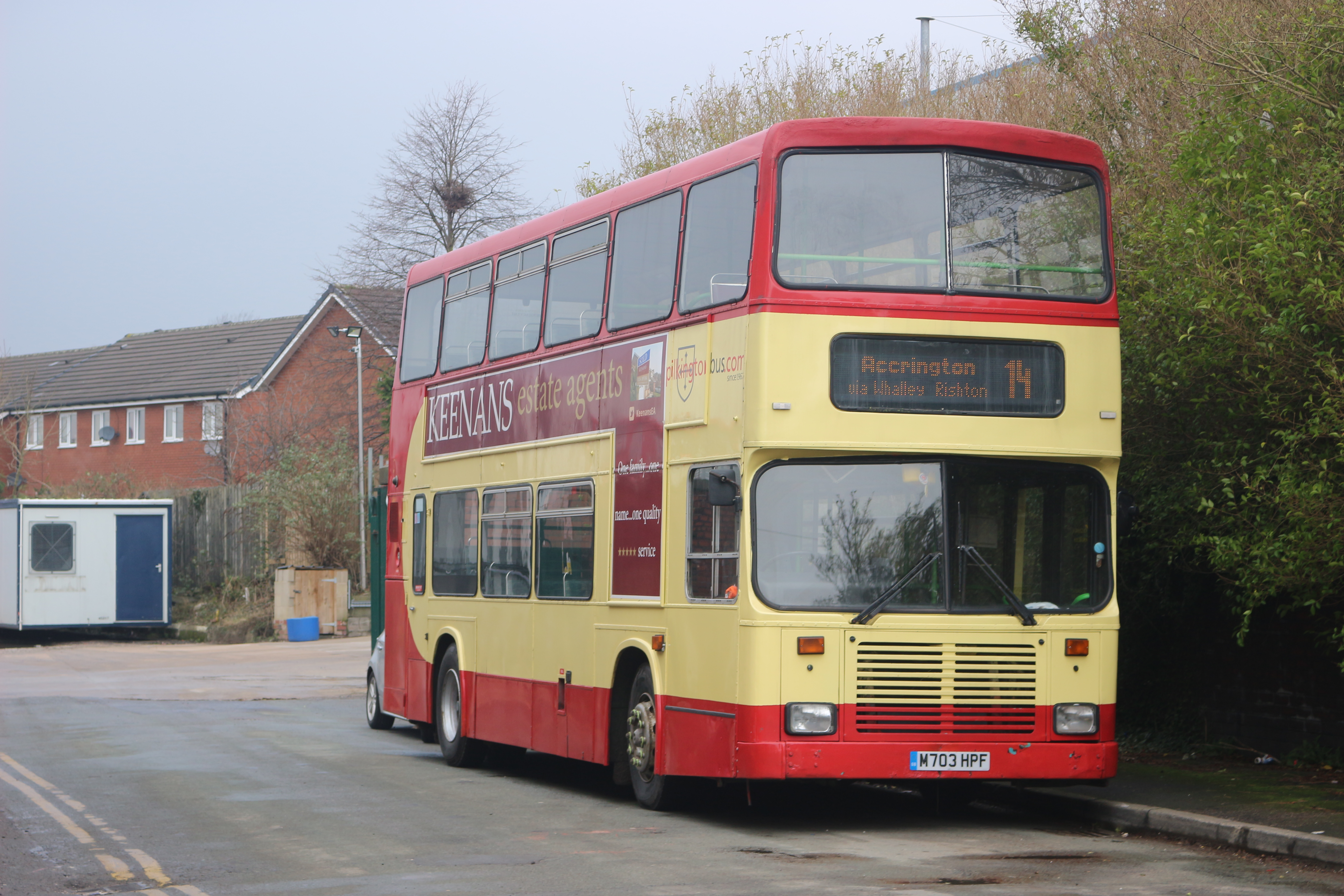
- East Lancs E Type on Volvo Olympian chassis

Overview
- Production: 1986-1995

Body and chassis
- Doors: 1 door
- Floor type: Step entrance
- Chassis: Dennis Dominator; Dennis Arrow; Leyland Olympian; Scania N113DRB; Volvo B10M; Volvo Olympian

The East Lancs E Type is a type of double-deck bus body built on different chassis by East Lancashire Coachbuilders.

== Chassis ==
Types bodied include the following:

- Dennis Dominator
- Dennis Arrow
- Leyland Olympian
- Scania N113DRB
- Volvo B10M
- Volvo Olympian

== Description ==
The E Type bears a strong visual resemblance to the Alexander R Type. East Lancs first built bodies resembling the R Type in 1984, which were almost identical in appearance to the Alexander product. Later examples had more East Lancs styling elements, making identification easier.

The E Type was superseded by the Cityzen on Scania N113DRB around 1996 and the Pyoneer on other chassis around 1997.

== See also ==
- List of buses
