= East Lancs 1984-style double-deck body =

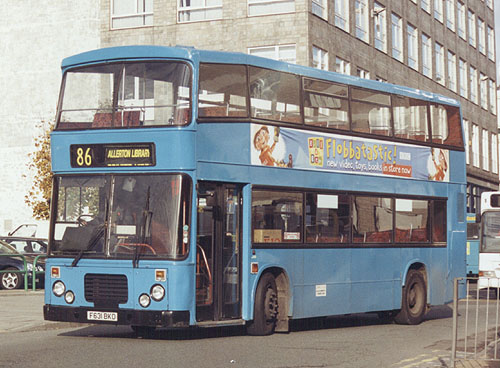
- East Lancs "Droop Nose" bodied Dennis Dominator

Overview
- Manufacturer: East Lancashire Coachbuilders

Body and chassis
- Doors: 1 door
- Floor type: Step entrance
- Chassis: Dennis Dominator; Volvo B10M; Leyland Olympian; Scania N112; Scania N113; Volvo B58 (rebody)

Powertrain
- Capacity: 57 to 76 seated

Dimensions
- Length: 9900mm, 10100mm and 10500mm
- Width: 2500mm
- Height: 4300mm

Chronology
- Successor: East Lancs Pyoneer

The East Lancs 1984-style double-deck body is a type of double-decker bus body with a step-entrance, built on several different chassis by East Lancashire Coachbuilders in England.

== Chassis ==
Several different chassis types were fitted with this style of bodywork. These include:

- Dennis Dominator
- Volvo B10M
- Leyland Olympian
- Scania N112 and N113
- Volvo B58 (rebody)

== Description ==
This distinctive style of bodywork has a downward-sloping front window bay on the upper deck, with both top and bottom edges angled downwards. The side windows are square-cornered. A large double-curvature upper deck windscreen (either single-piece or two-piece) is one of the most distinctive features.

Originally a tall, wrap-around lower deck windscreen was fitted, but some batches were fitted with a double-curvature windscreen, with either a straight or an arched top.

A batch of Dennis Dominators built for Southampton Citybus have bodywork which is mostly to this style, including the downswept front upper deck window bay, but with a divided flat upper deck windscreen in place of the distinctive double-curvature screen.

== History ==
This design was introduced in 1984. Early examples included Dennis Dominators for Leicester CityBus. At first it was often specified for coach use, sometimes by operators that at the same time specified one of the plainer designs for bus use. This has sometimes earned it the misnomer "coach body", but in fact a majority were double-decker buses.

Later orders came from Drawlane subsidiaries London & Country, North Western and Midland Red North.

== Naming ==
This design had no official name that was used publicly, however it has been referred to as the Droop Nose Design.

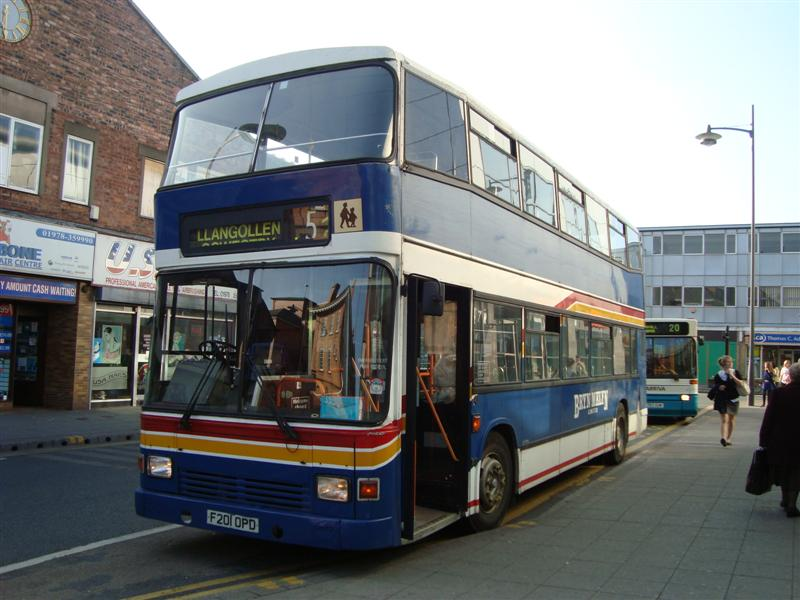
East Lancs 1984-style bodied Dennis Dominator in May 1998

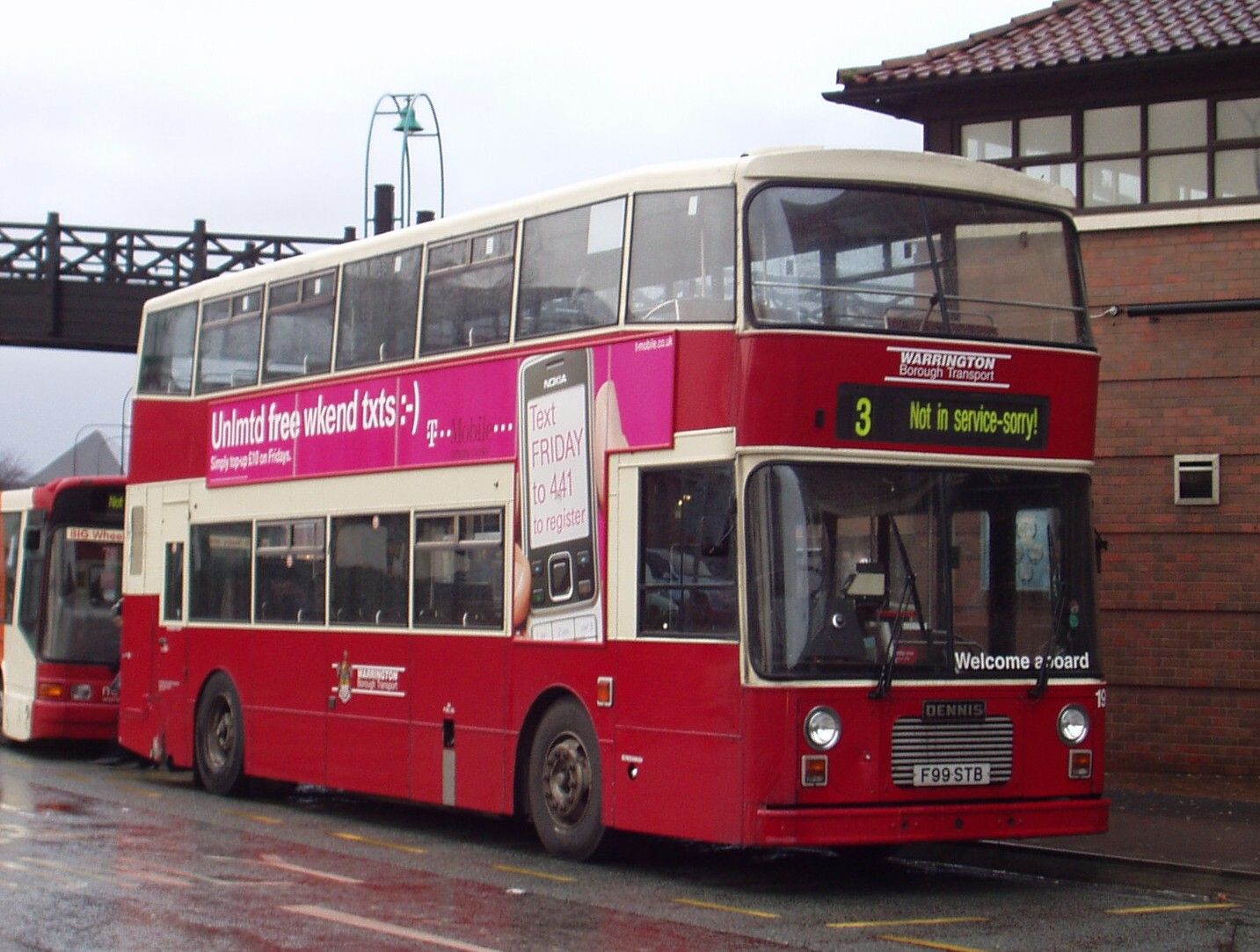
East Lancs 1984-style bodied Dennis Dominator in 29 December 2007

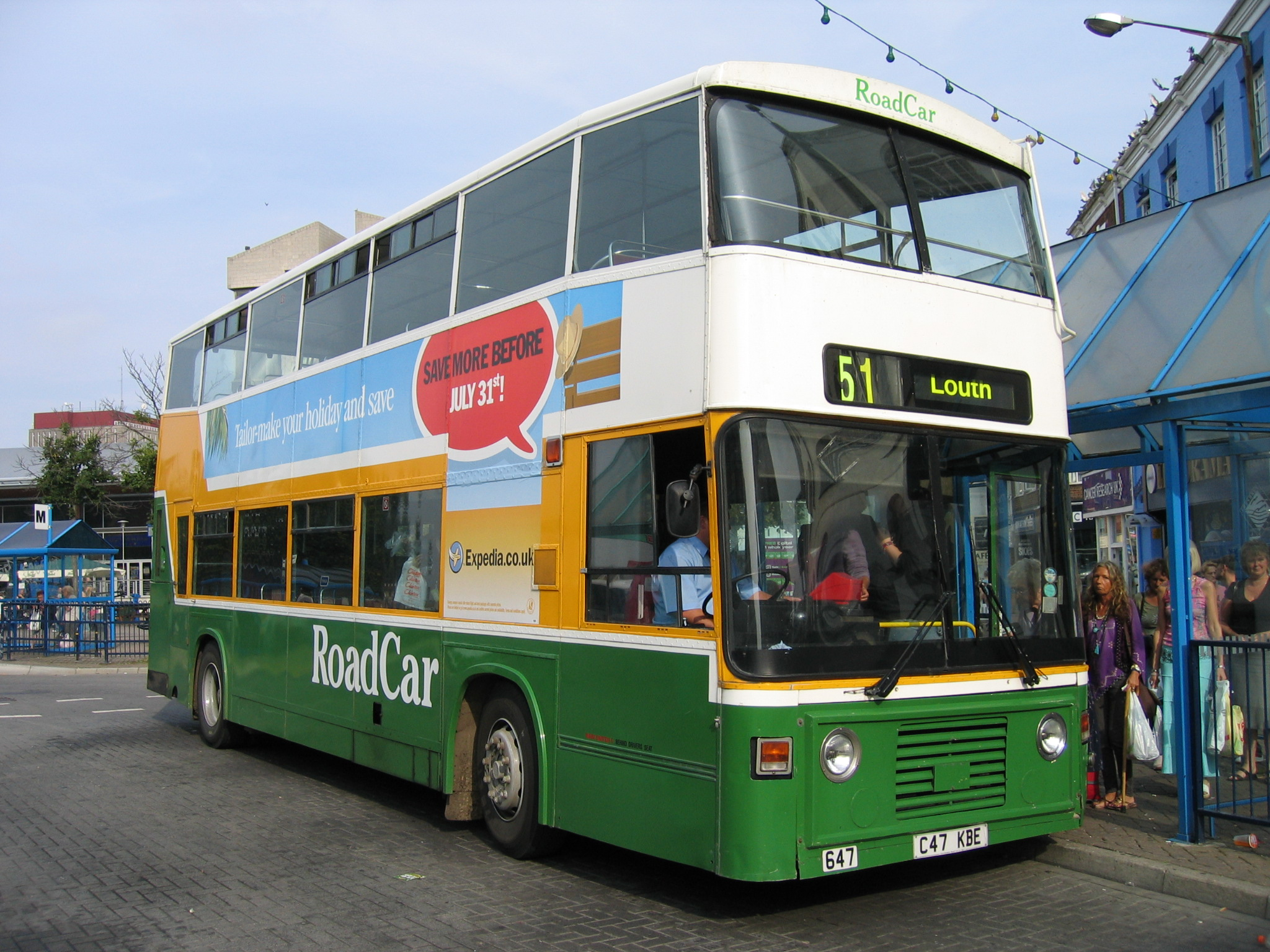
East Lancs 1984-style bodied Leyland Olympian in September 2005

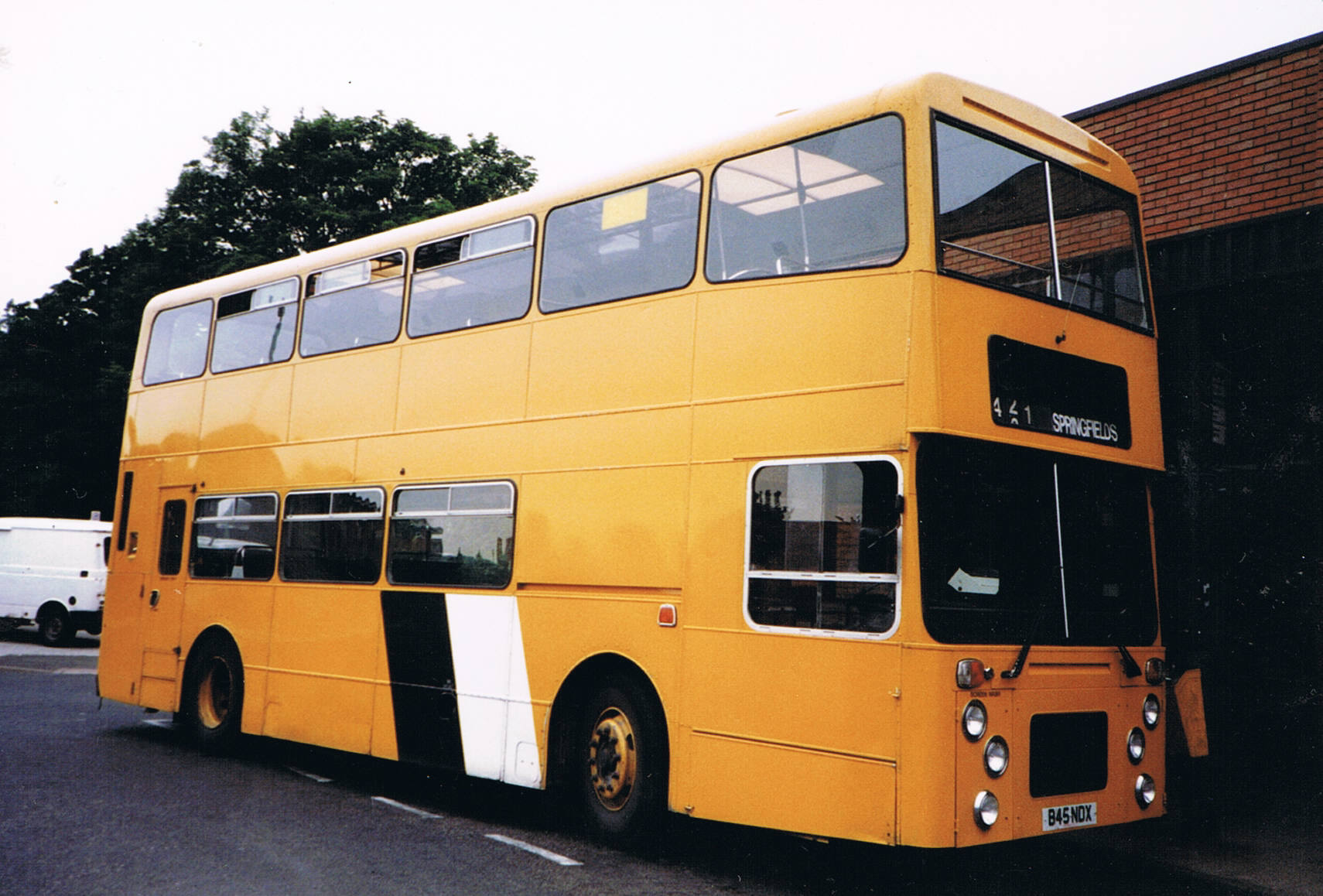
East Lancs 1984-style bodied Leyland Olympian in the 90s

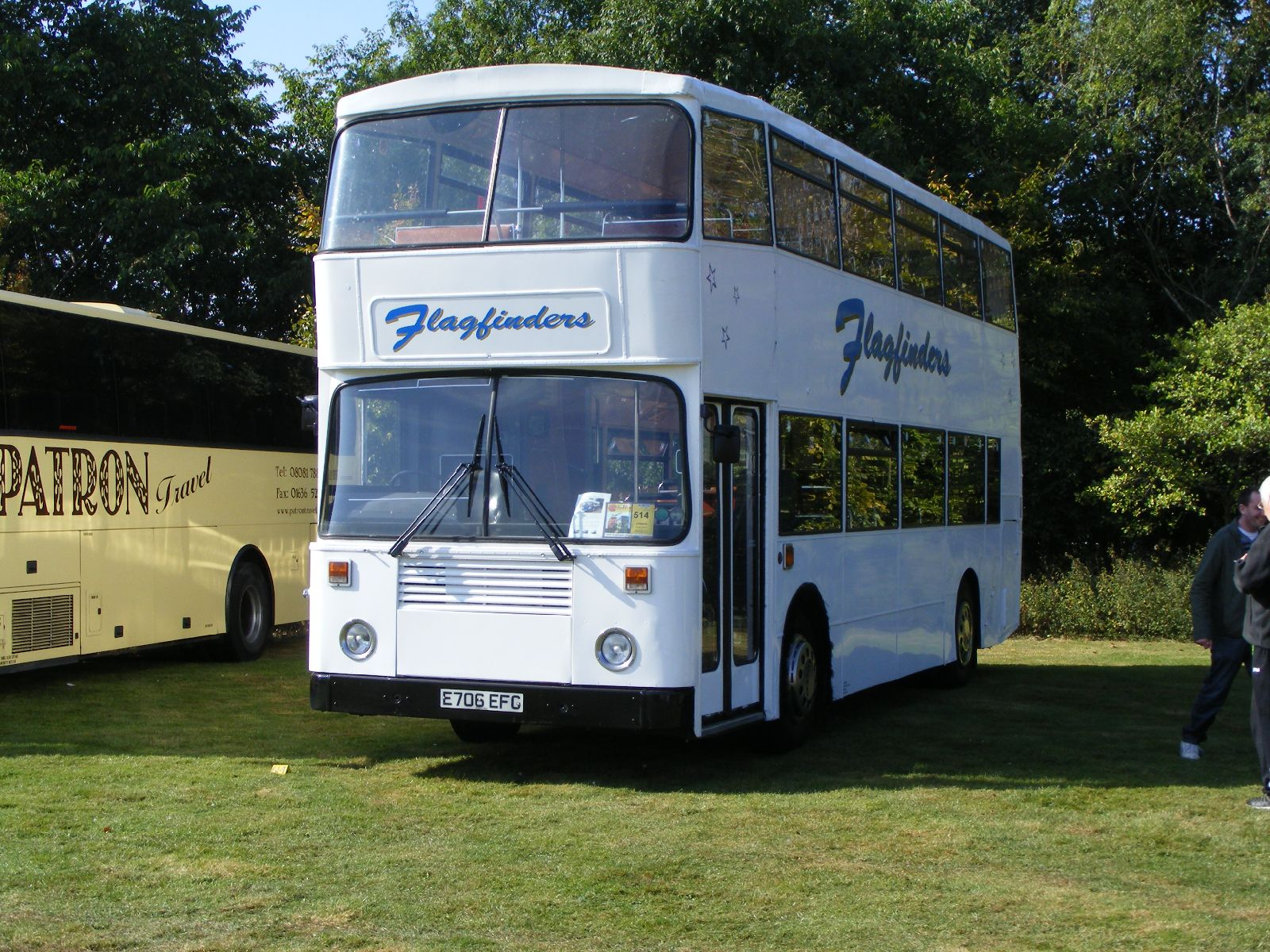
East Lancs 1984-style bodied Scania N112DR in September 2009

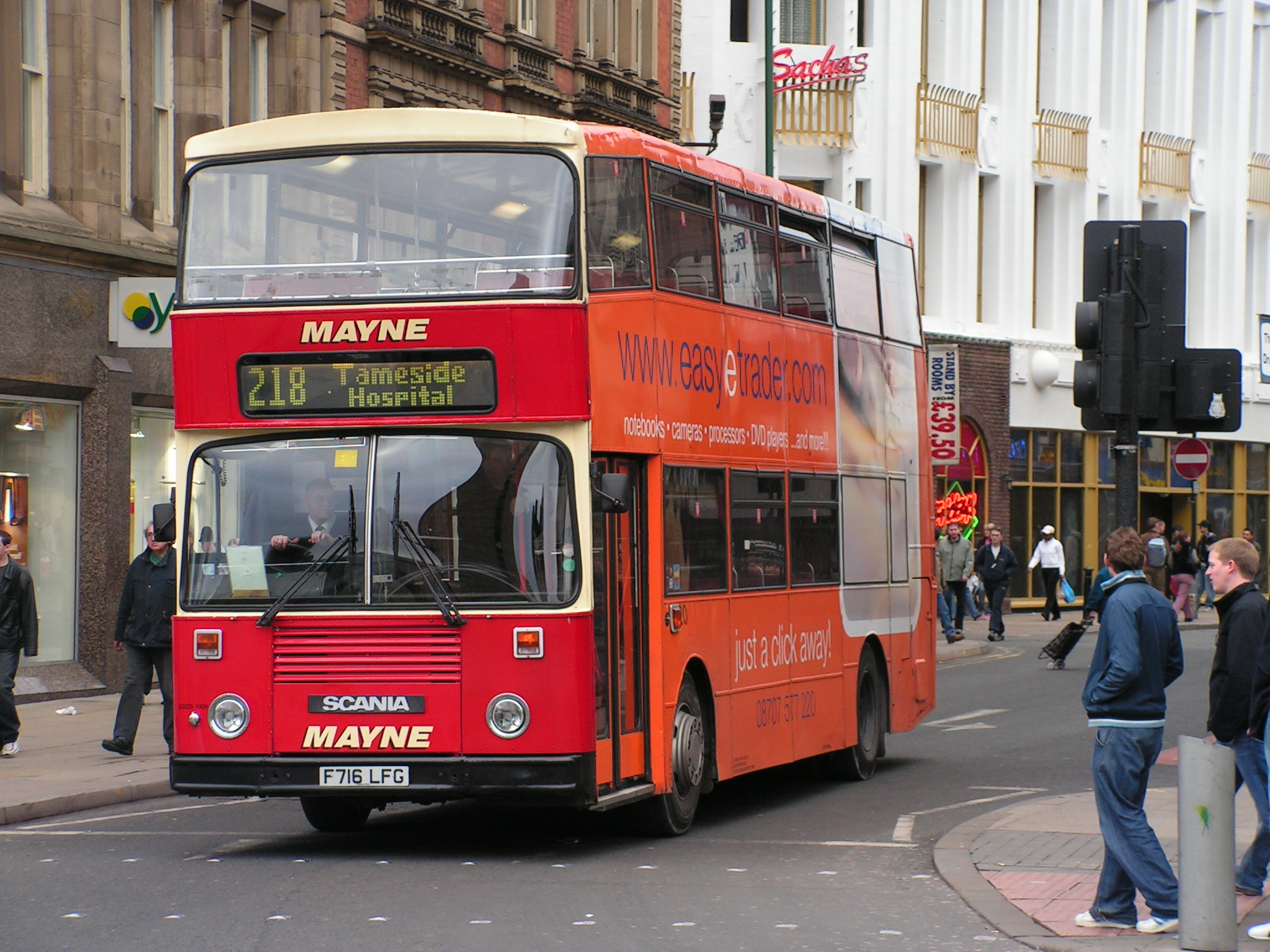
East Lancs 1984-style bodied Scania N113DR in January 2005

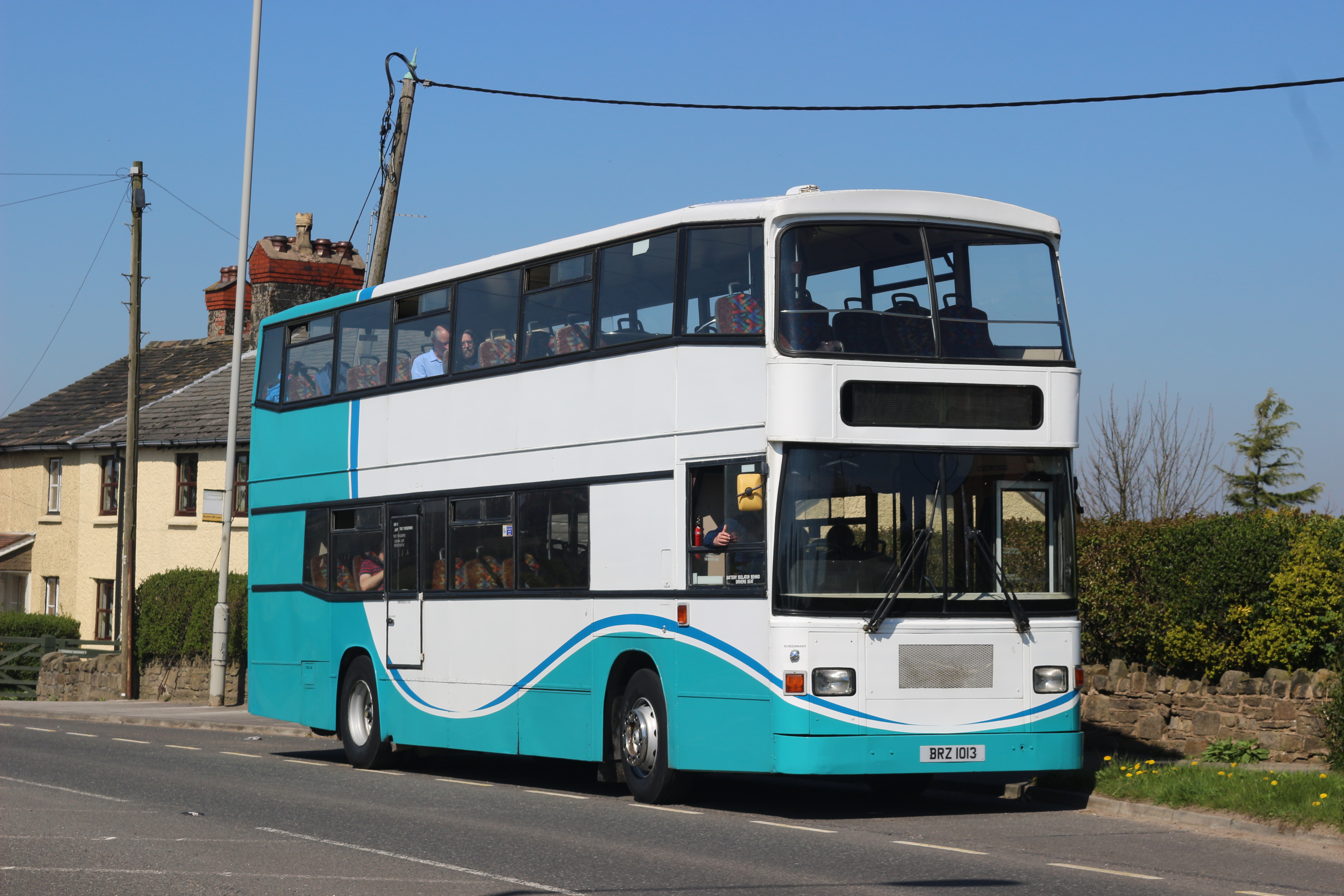
East Lancs 1984-style bodied Volvo Citybus in April 2017

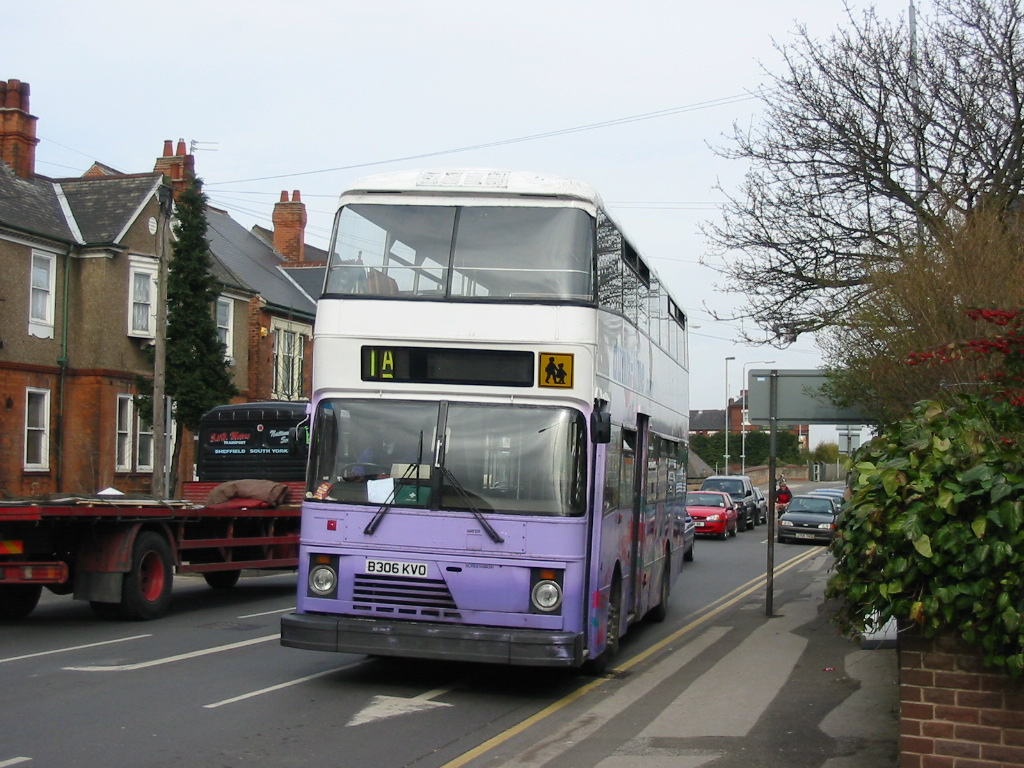
East Lancs 1984-style bodied Volvo Citybus in March 2004

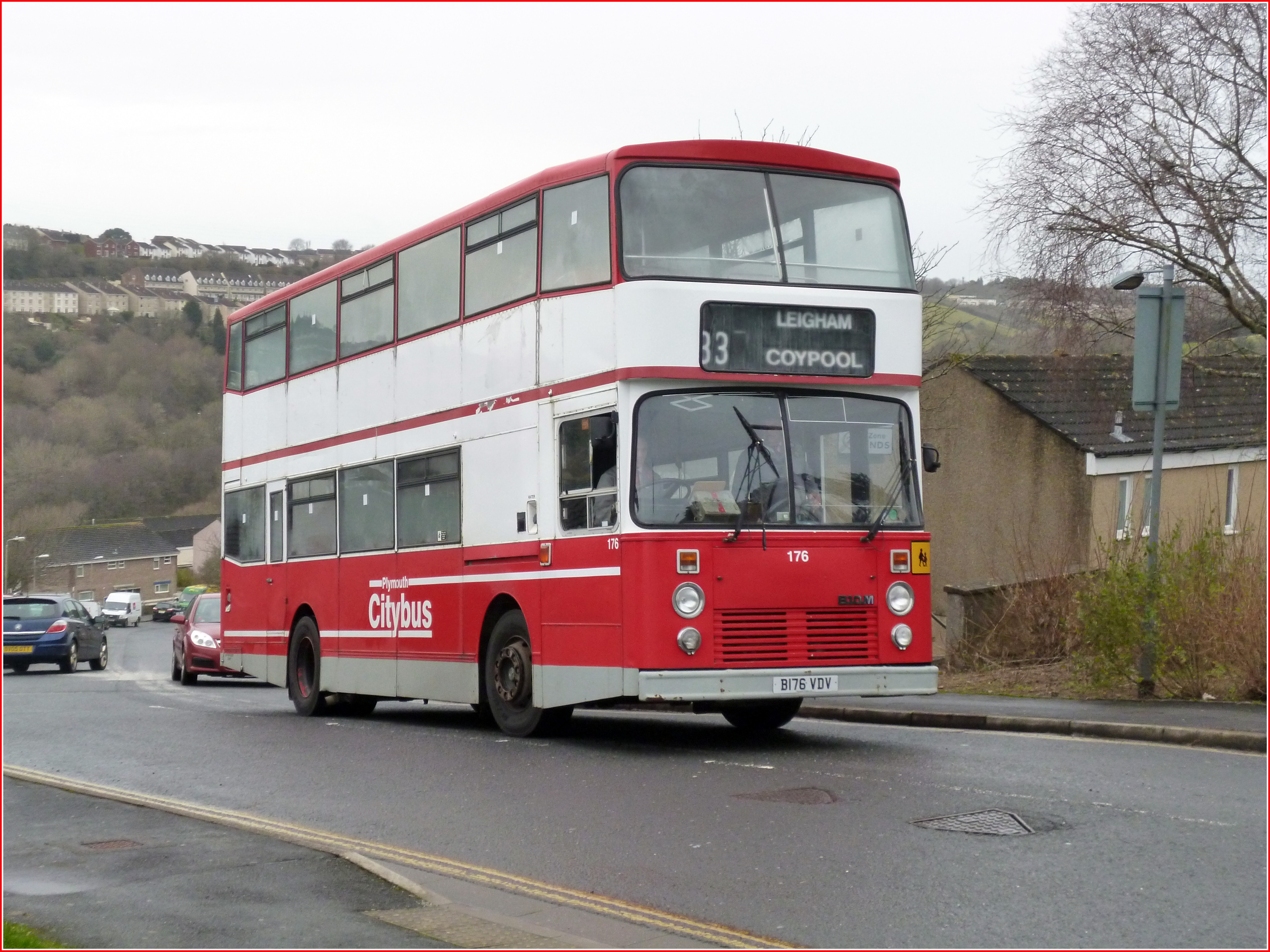
East Lancs 1984-style bodied Volvo Citybus in December 2012

== See also ==
- List of buses
