= London Buses Airbus routes =

London Buses Airbus routes describes the dedicated routes run by London Buses and its successors to Heathrow Airport. The routes have the prefix letter A. Currently only one route exists, route A10, with four others having been withdrawn.

== Former routes ==
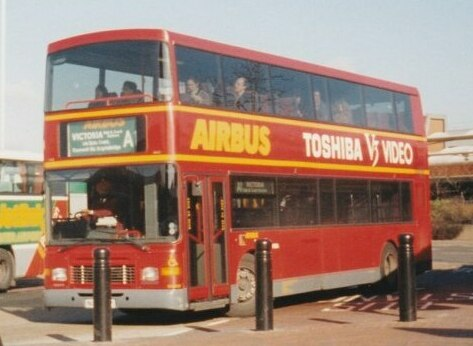
London United Airbus Alexander Royale bodied Volvo Olympian at Heathrow Airport in October 1996

In 1981, two Airbus routes, routes A1 and A2, were introduced. Route A1 ran to Victoria and route A2 to Kings Cross via Marble Arch. An attempt was made to launch a route A3, running from central London to Stansted Airport, but this was quickly abandoned, as was a second attempt in 1992. The routes were operated by 16 new MCW Metrobuses, later increasing to 24.

The Airbus services were taken over by London United when London Buses was split into subsidiaries in 1991. London United were reportedly unhappy with their profitability, and considered transferring the routes to the London Coaches operation which was then up for sale, but this did not take place. In 1995, the 36 Metrobuses were partially replaced by 12 new Volvo Olympians fitted with air conditioning.

Also in 1995, a new route called Airbus Direct was launched. This linked Heathrow to nearby hotels, operating on request to a hotel on any reasonable route using 16 early Dennis Darts displaced from other routes.

Following the introduction of the Heathrow Express train service in 1998, the routes' popularity fell, and route A1 was withdrawn. The surviving routes A2 and Airbus Direct were sold to National Express in February 2000. The A2 was rebranded as a National Express Airport service in 2002, but withdrawn in late 2004 as passenger numbers fell once more. Airbus Direct continued, and was rebranded Hotelink and later Dot2Dot, but was sold to Corot plc in early 2009 and finally withdrawn later in the year.
