= Dennis Dominator =

Step-entrance double-decker bus chassis

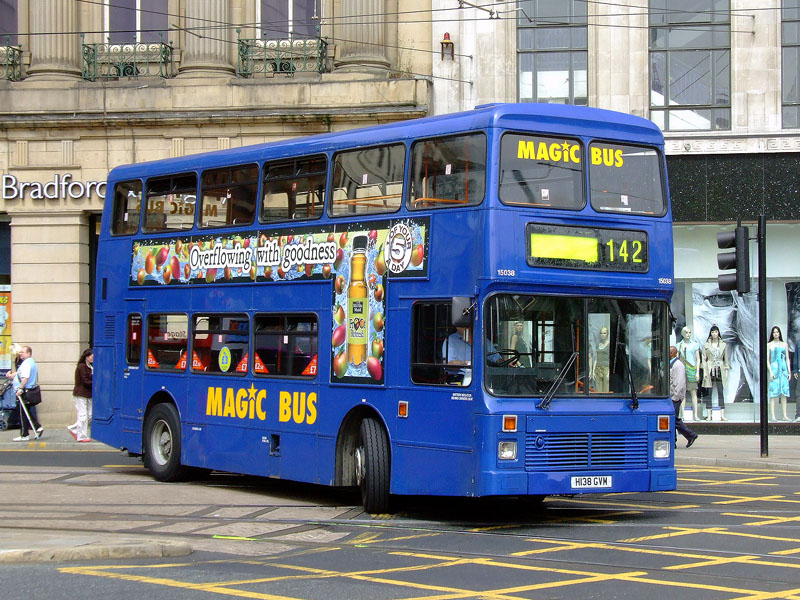
- Stagecoach Manchester Northern Counties Palatine bodied Dominator crossing tram lines near Piccadilly Gardens in June 2006

Overview
- Manufacturer: Dennis
- Production: 1977–1996

Body and chassis
- Doors: 1-2
- Floor type: Step entrance
- Related: Dennis Dragon; Dennis Domino

Powertrain
- Engine: Gardner 6LXB; Gardner 6LXCT; Gardner LG1200; Rolls-Royce Eagle; DAF DK1160; Cummins L10
- Transmission: Voith D851; ZF Ecomat 4HP-500

Dimensions
- Length: 9.5m or 10.3m

Chronology
- Successor: Dennis Arrow

The Dennis Dominator was Dennis's first rear-engined double-decker bus chassis. It was launched in 1977.

== History ==
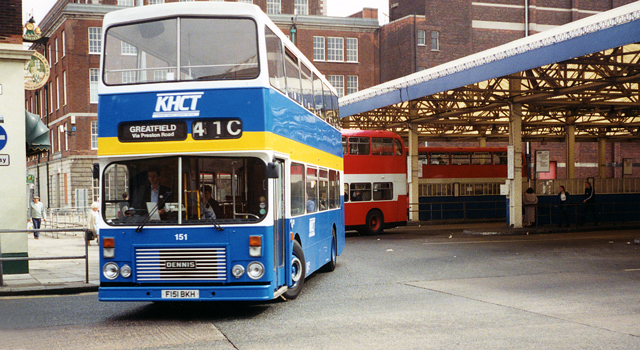
Kingston upon Hull City Transport East Lancs E Type bodied Dominator at Hull bus station in May 1995

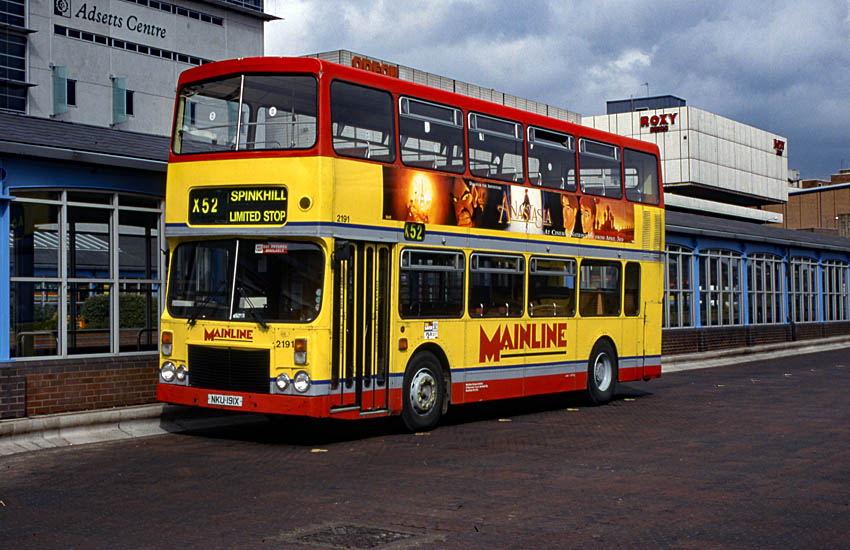
Mainline Dennis Dominator with Alexander body in 1998

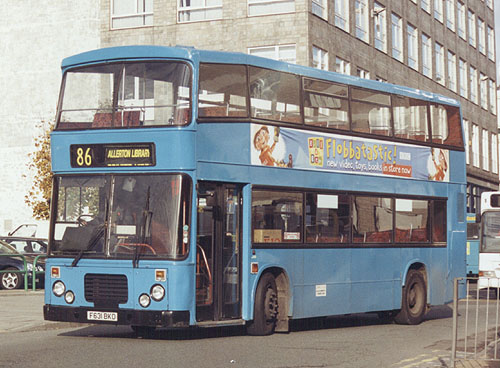
Citybus East Lancs bodied Dominator in Liverpool in March 2002

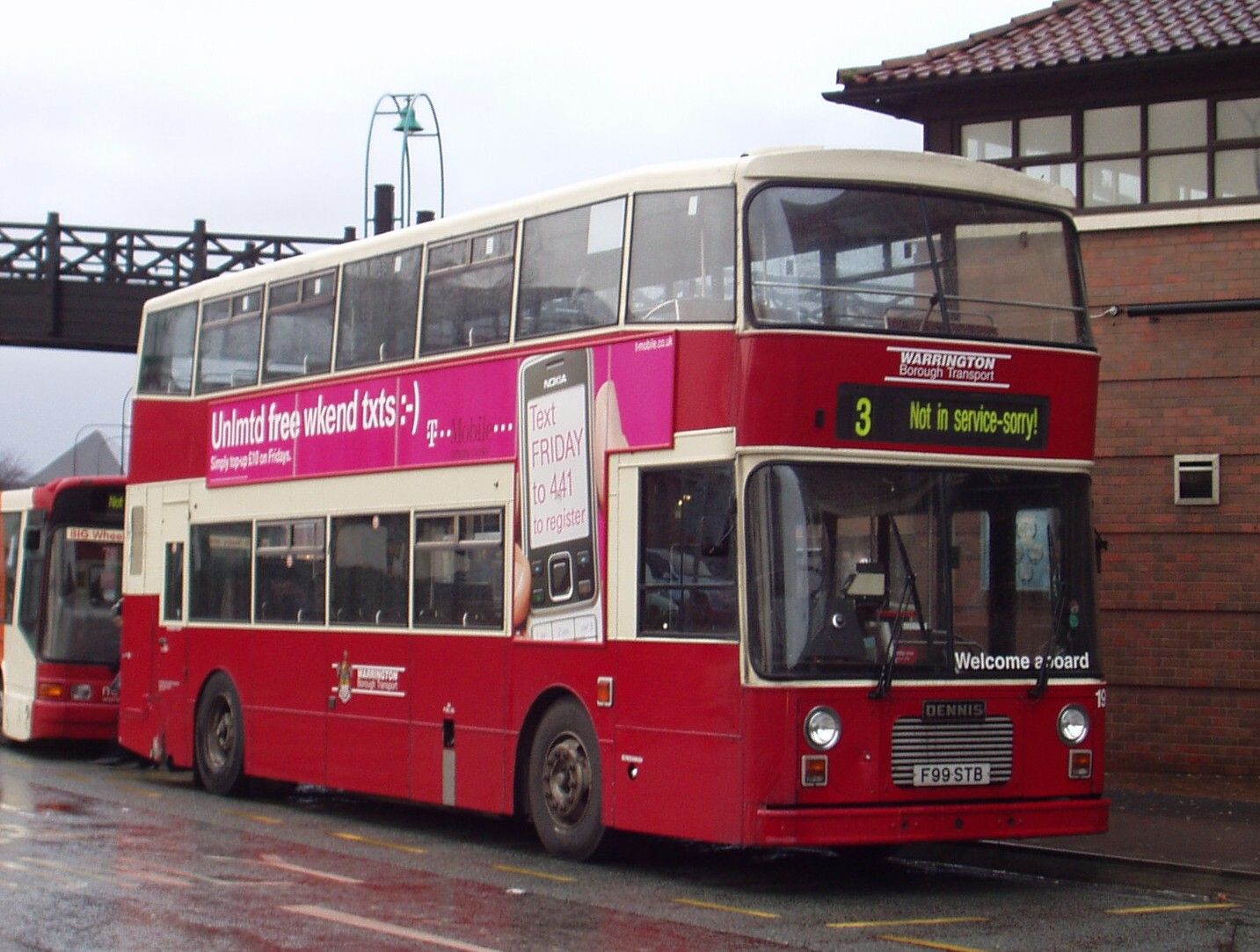
Warrington Borough Transport East Lancs bodied Dominator in December 2007

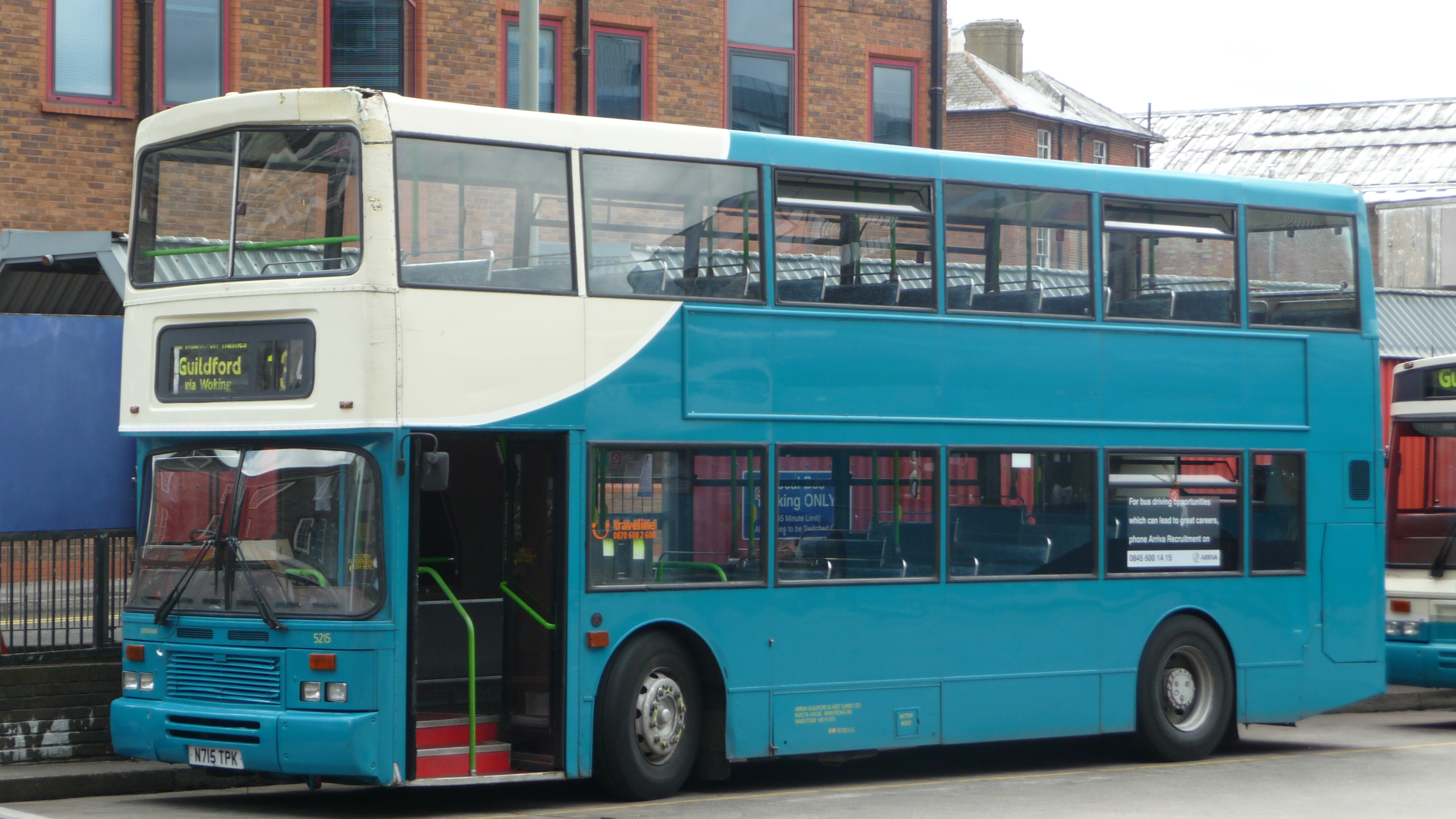
Arriva Southern Counties East Lancs bodied Dominator at Guildford bus station in June 2009

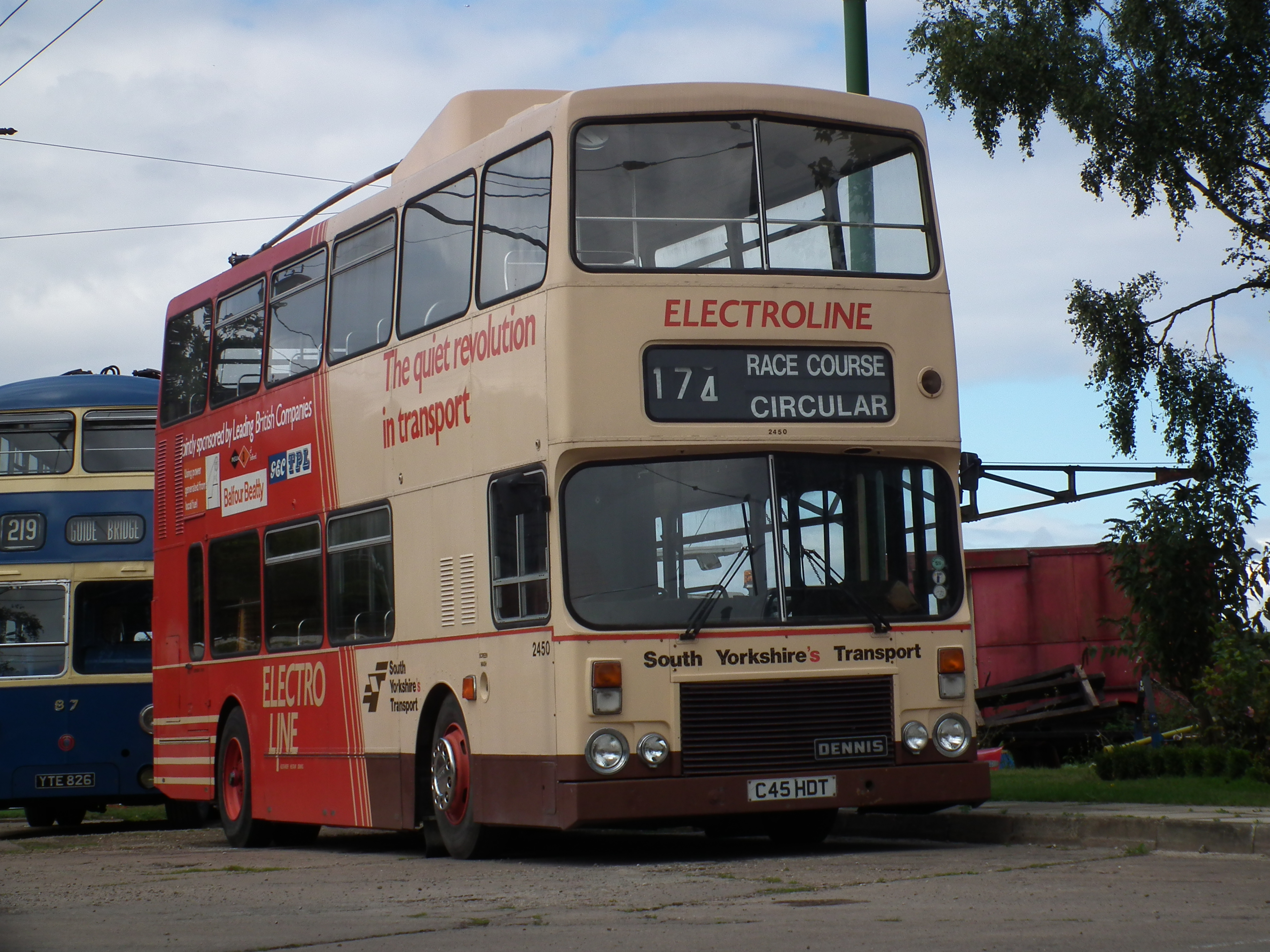
Preserved Alexander RH bodied Dominator trolleybus in August 2011

Dennis had been absent from the bus manufacturing market since the last Lolines were produced in 1967. The Dominator was described as bespoke, with numerous options. To some extent it was considered a successor to the Daimler/Leyland Fleetline.

The Dominator was different from the Fleetline in that the radiator was located at the front instead of the offside of the engine compartment.

It was intended to be sold mainly with the Gardner 6LXB engine coupled up to a Voith DIWA transmission and a drop-centre rear axle, but hub-reduction rear axle and other engine options including the Rolls-Royce Eagle, the Cummins L10, the turbocharged Gardner 6LXCT and DAF engines were also available.

== United Kingdom ==
The largest British customer of the Dennis Dominator was South Yorkshire PTE, with a total of 318 buses being delivered to the company. These included one trolleybus which was built in 1985 for test and evaluation. Many had Rolls-Royce Eagle engines and hub-reduction axles. Most of the SYPTE vehicles received Alexander RH bodywork, these being delivered from 1981 to 1987, though some were bodied by East Lancs and Northern Counties.

The SYPTE Dominators were delivered in phases to replace Daimler Fleetlines, Leyland Atlanteans, Volvo Ailsa B55s, some of which dated to the early 1970s. The final batch of Dominators delivered to Sheffield included 20 vehicles fitted with coach seats and were allocated to regionwide express services with distinctive Fastline branding. The high standard of engineering led to the last Dominators in South Yorkshire remaining in service in Doncaster until July 2006.

The Dominator also appealed to municipal operators such as Leicester City Transport who from 1977 to 1989 bought 123, mainly with East Lancs bodies although seven had Marshall bodies, all of which were withdrawn from public service by 2005. It was also sold in reasonable numbers to Central Scottish and Western Scottish from 1981 with Alexander low-height RL-type bodywork. Other notable Dominator users included Greater Manchester Transport and its successor GM Buses, all of which had Northern Counties bodywork, Warrington Borough Transport with East Lancs bodies, Merseyside Transport with Willowbrook and Alexander RH bodies, and London Transport, who took three with Northern Counties bodywork for its Alternative Vehicle Evaluation (AVE) programme in the mid-1980s.

Production of the Dominator was less consistent after bus deregulation in 1986 with production being sporadic during the 1992–96 period. Eight were built in 1992; three in 1993 for a cancelled Strathclyde Buses order that was later sold to Mayne Coaches; none in 1994 or 1995; and a final four built in 1996, delivered to London & Country with East Lancs bodywork alongside a batch of ten double-deck Dennis Arrows.

London Pride Sightseeing were a considerable user for second-hand Dennis Dominators, operating 24 Dominators, all but four converted to open top buses. These were withdrawn in 2005. Some were transferred to The Original Tour during the transition in 2001.

=== Single-deck Dominators ===
The Dominator was conceived as a competitor to the Daimler Fleetline and initially customers were generally those who had previously taken double-deck Fleetlines, however the largest component of the all-single deck Darlington Corporation fleet was the single-deck Fleetline SRG6, the rest of its parc in 1977 consisted of 1967 Daimler Roadliners, new Leyland Leopards and 1974 Seddon Pennine RU. So, in 1978, it ordered a single-deck version of the Dominator with an extended-wheelbase, designed for 11-metre coachwork, this was bodied by Marshall and the style, dual door with 46 seats, when exhibited on the Dennis stand at the 1978 Motor Show at the National Exhibition Centre was named Camair 80.

David Cox, then engineering director of Merseyside PTE, reviewed it under his alias Midlander for Buses. He commented that the design was nothing like as stylish, but probably cheaper to produce than the original Marshall Camair. He felt that the side-facing bench seats over the front wheel arches, with their deep footstools, gave a rather tunnel-like aspect, and offered his ideas on a tidier layout, but praised the principle of using the same chassis for double and single-deck applications. Darlington took a further nine in the following year. Dennis designated all ten of these SD103A. They were the only customer to place a repeat order (in 1981) for eight outwardly identical vehicles coded SD128A. Darlington's next purchase was to be the only batch of Ward Motors Dalesman GRXI in 1984.

The next customer was the borough of Hartlepool, a neighbouring fleet and another that was all single-deck, they chose East Lancashire Coachbuilders to body their six. Unlike Marshall, East Lancs did not build over the engine compartment, giving an effect reminiscent of Birmingham's single-deck Fleetlines and Great Yarmouth's single-deck Atlanteans, which had been bodied respectively in 1965 and 1967 by Marshall. With dual-doors the Hartlepool buses sat only 43. Hartlepool had never operated Fleetlines of any sort, and had reluctantly switched from Leyland-engined Bristol REs with dual-door Eastern Coach Works bodies to Leyland Nationals before these buses, their first since the 1950s with Gardner engines. They were later to take Leyland National 2s and Dennis Falcons.

A number of chief engineers working for operators in the North of England met regularly at the time at gatherings sponsored by the Traffic Commissioner, as well as Tyne and Wear PTE, United Automobile Services, Northern General Transport Company, Trimdon Motor Services, Cleveland Transit, Darlington and Hartlepool these included Barrow in Furness Borough Transport. They also were all-single deck at the time, but contemplating future double deck orders. So their numbers 18 and 19 carried similar bodies to the Hartlepool buses, but with only a front entry/exit door and 46 seats. These two batches shared the same SD115 type code, and chassis numbers for the two batches comprised a single series. Barrow had a batch of five East Lancs bodied single-deck Fleetlines delivered in 1971, which were 50 seaters with seating above the engine, but since those Barrow Borough Transport had switched to the locally-built Leyland National, it was problems with the Leyland 510 engines on these as well as standardisation with prospective double deckers that led to Barrow's purchase of Dominators. Barrow were to order double deckers in 1984, but these turned out to be Leyland Atlanteans.

The fourth customer was Merthyr Tydfil Transport, another all single-deck fleet, like Hartlepool, no Fleetlines were operated. The fleet consisted of East Lancs-bodied Leopards, Bristol REs with East Lancs and Eastern Coach Works bodies, Leyland Nationals and a batch of Metro-Scanias. Hartlepools single-deck Dominators had its first East Lancs bodies, Merthyr Tydfil's their first Marshall bodies. Their six (coded SD116) had single-door 50 seat Camair 80 coachwork. Like Hartlepool Leyland National 2s followed. Later in life, these buses were sold to the City of Chester, whose general manager had previously worked at Darlington.

The penultimate customer took their single-deck Dominator, the sole SD130A, some months after the final new customer's batch was delivered but this was no surprise as the job involved was a lot more complex than a bus body. EBB846W was to the bespoke specification of the Tyne and Wear Metropolitan Fire Brigade and the vehicle was constructed by fire-appliance specialists Angloco, it was the fire brigade's number 319, and it was comprehensively fitted-out as a control and communications centre for major incidents. The body was low and angular, looking to be over the bus maximum width of 2.5m. It had two outward-opening doors on the nearside and a single 'passenger' window in mid wheelbase. It was liveried in fire-engine red, the grille was an unadorned mesh affair in an otherwise flat front, featuring a divided flat-glazed windscreen.

The final customer for the single-deck Dominator was Swindon based Thamesdown Transport. A proportion of the fleet had to be single-deck because of low railway bridges. Thamesdown's numbers 1-4 (FAM1-4W) were the only short-wheelbase single-deck Dominators, type SD132B, they had 40 coach seats in 10-metre single-door Marshall Camair 80 bodies. Unlike the other customers, Thamesdown later took substantial numbers of double-deck Dominators.

Only 37 single-deck Dominators were built, all but the show bus in 1979–81. None are known to survive. The Camair 80 body also went on four 1970 Fleetlines for Tayside, Strathclyde PTE's single deck Ailsa, a number of Dennis Falcons and in a unique demountable-body version on Dodge Commando, again for Strathclyde PTE.

G.G. Hillditch, who had been one of the inspirations behind the Dominator and, at the time as general manager of Leicester City Transport, was the launch customer for the type, had earlier (when general manager of the Halifax Corporation, Halifax Joint Committee and Todmorden Joint Committee fleets) been one of the customers requesting the SRG6 Fleetline single-decker, but when Leicester required further single-deckers from 1980 instead of ordering the Dominator he commissioned the Dennis Falcon H.

== Export orders ==
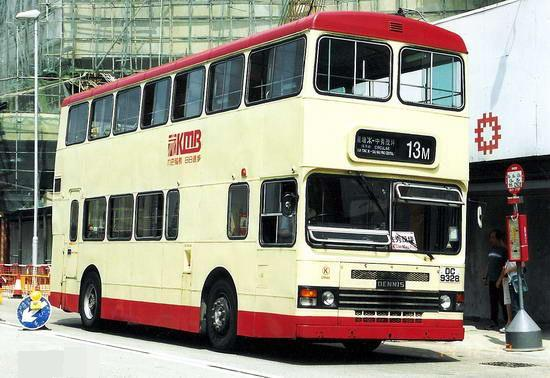
Kowloon Motor Bus Duple Metsec bodied Dominator in August 2001

The Dominator was also sold to Hong Kong. China Motor Bus put the first Dominator (with East Lancs body) into service in 1979, being followed by six with Alexander RL-type body in 1982, primarily for its route 15 (Central-The Peak). Kowloon Motor Bus bought 40 Duple Metsec bodied Dominators between 1983 and 1984.

One Dominator with East Lancs body and DAF engine was exported as demonstrator for Singapore Bus Service in 1982. It was shipped to Hong Kong after the trial and entered Kowloon Motor Bus' training fleet in 1986.

== End of production ==
After a production run of 1,007 examples for the UK and export markets, the Dominator was replaced by the short-lived longitudinal-engined Dennis Arrow in 1996, which itself was replaced by the more popular low-floor Dennis Trident 2 in 1997.

== Dominator variants ==
=== Dennis Falcon ===
In 1980, Dennis developed the Falcon single-deck bus with longitudinally-mounted rear engine. The Falcon H variant had a horizontal Gardner engine with the Voith gearbox mounted ahead of the rear axle, the later Falcon HC had the Voith transmission mounted behind the rear axle and close-coupled to the Gardner engine. The Falcon V variant had vertical engines.

=== Dennis Dragon/Condor ===
In 1982, a tri-axle version was developed for the Hong Kong market, known as the Dennis Dragon which was sold to Kowloon Motor Bus. The same model was sold to China Motor Bus, but was known as the Condor. They were usually bodied by Duple Metsec. Some were purchased by Stagecoach for its Kenyan and Malawi operations.

Some of these were repatriated to the UK through dealer Ensignbus. They are used for school runs and sightseeing since they have high-capacity.

=== Dennis Domino ===
In 1984, Dennis introduced a midibus chassis which was a scaled down Dominator, it could be fitted with Perkins T6.354 and Avon Maxwell transmission.

It was only sold to two customers, Greater Manchester Transport and South Yorkshire Transport. The Dominos for Greater Manchester Transport were Northern Counties bodied, and South Yorkshire Transport ones were bodied by Optare.
