= Harris Bus =

Bus operator in Essex and London, England

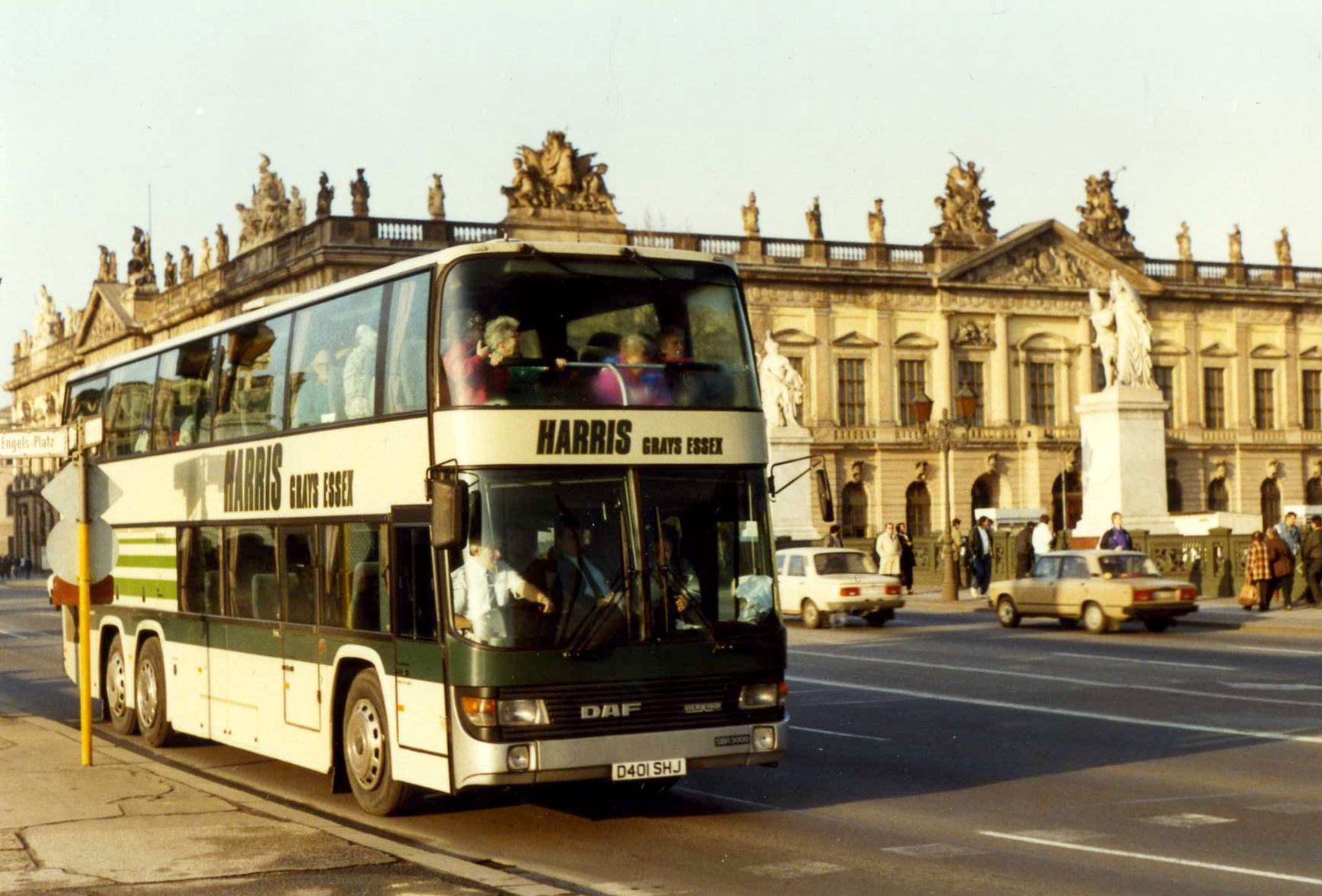
- DAF coach in East Berlin in January 1990
- Parent: Frank Harris
- Founded: October 1986
- Ceased operation: December 1999
- Headquarters: Grays
- Service area: Essex; London

Harris Bus was an English bus operator that operated services under contract to Transport for London.

== History ==
Harris Bus was established in October 1986 as bus and coach operator in Grays. In 1997 it diversified, operating routes under contract to London Regional Transport winning tenders to operate routes 108, 128, 129, 132, 150 and 180.

In December 1999, Harris Bus was placed in administration, with its London services taken over by London Regional Transport's East Thames Buses subsidiary.
