= GM Buses =

Former major bus operator in Greater Manchester

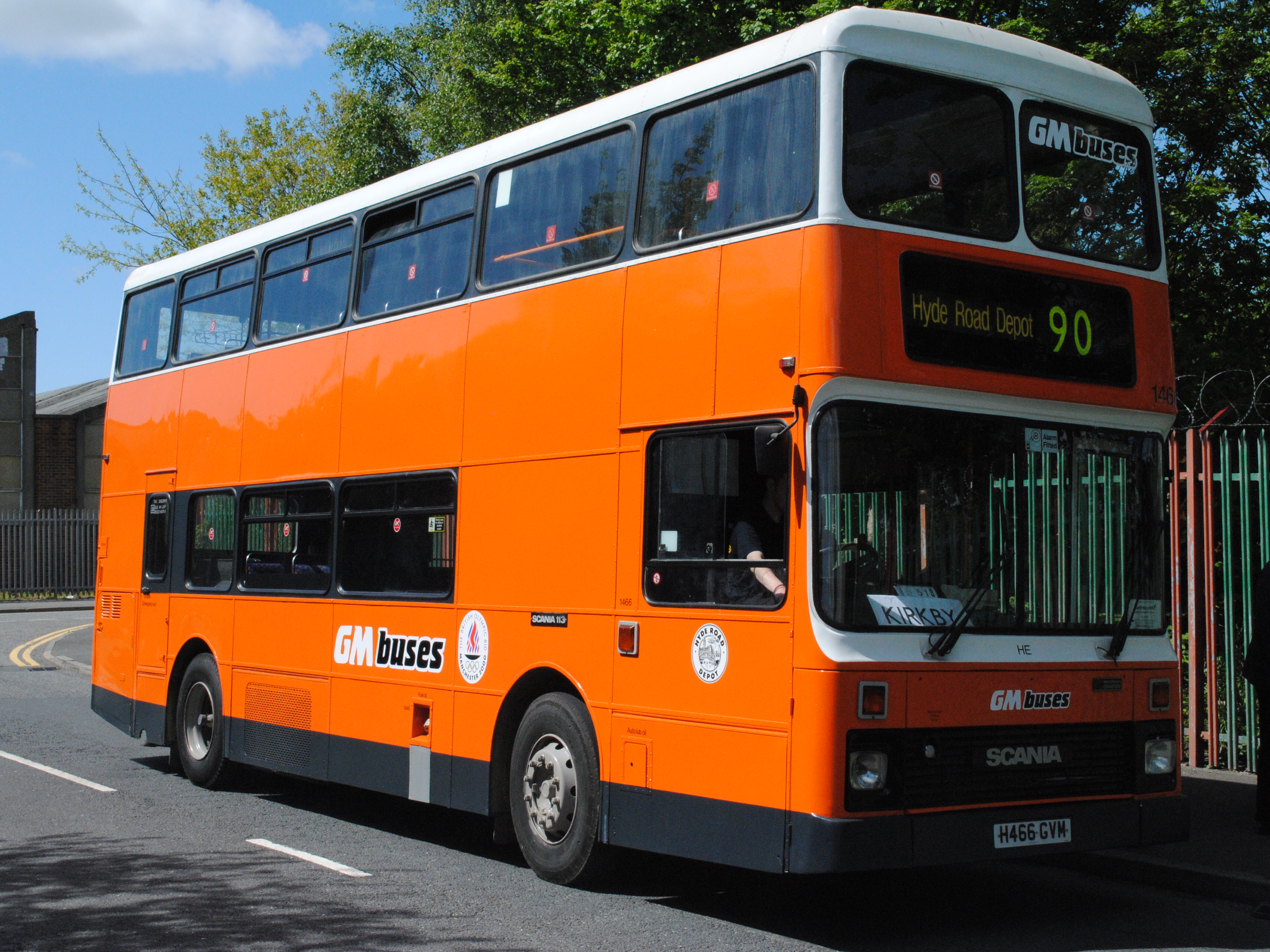
- Preserved GM Buses Northern Counties Palatine bodied Scania N113DRB in Kirkby in 2013
- Parent: Greater Manchester Passenger Transport Executive
- Founded: 27 February 1986; 40 years ago
- Defunct: 1996; 30 years ago
- Headquarters: Ardwick, Manchester
- Service area: Greater Manchester; Merseyside
- Service type: Bus operator

GM Buses was a major bus operator serving the ten metropolitan districts of Greater Manchester in North West England. The company was formed in February 1986 by the Greater Manchester Passenger Transport Executive prior to deregulation on 26 October. In December 1993, it was split into GM Buses North and GM Buses South in order to increase competition for services in the area, before they were sold to the FirstGroup and Stagecoach respectively.

== History ==
=== SELNEC and Greater Manchester Transport ===
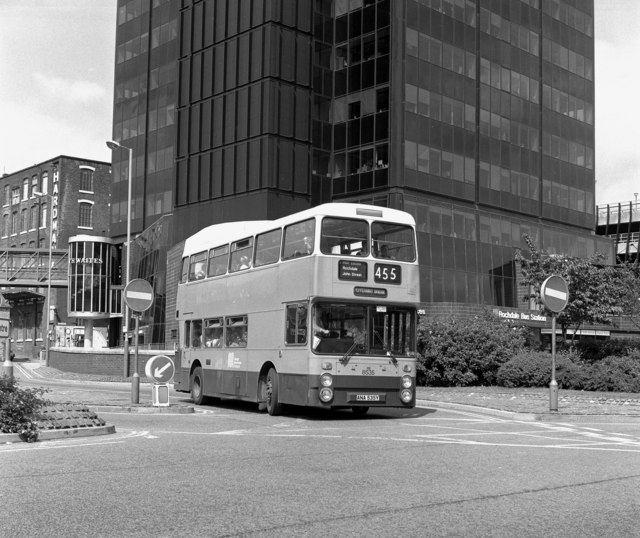
Greater Manchester Transport Northern Counties 'Standard' bodied Leyland Atlantean in Rochdale in 1984

The Transport Act 1968 resulted in several bus companies run by local authorities around Greater Manchester merging to create a central organisation. It consisted of companies operating in the following areas:

- Ashton-under-Lyne
- Bolton
- Bury
- Leigh
- Manchester
- Oldham
- Rochdale
- Salford
- Stalybridge, Hyde, Mossley & Dukinfield (operated by the SHMD Joint Board)
- Stockport
- Wigan

The new central organisation was named SELNEC, the South East Lancashire North East Cheshire Passenger Transport Executive, and commenced operations on 1 October 1969. SELNEC introduced a standard fleet livery of orange and white, with the company split into three zones: Northern, Central and Southern.

From 1 April 1974, the Local Government Act 1972 changed many of the UK's administrative areas and the county of Greater Manchester was created. As a result, SELNEC was renamed Greater Manchester Transport. In 1981, a new fleet livery of orange, brown and white was adopted. Also in the same year, Lancashire United Transport, based in Atherton, was absorbed into Greater Manchester Transport.

=== Deregulation ===
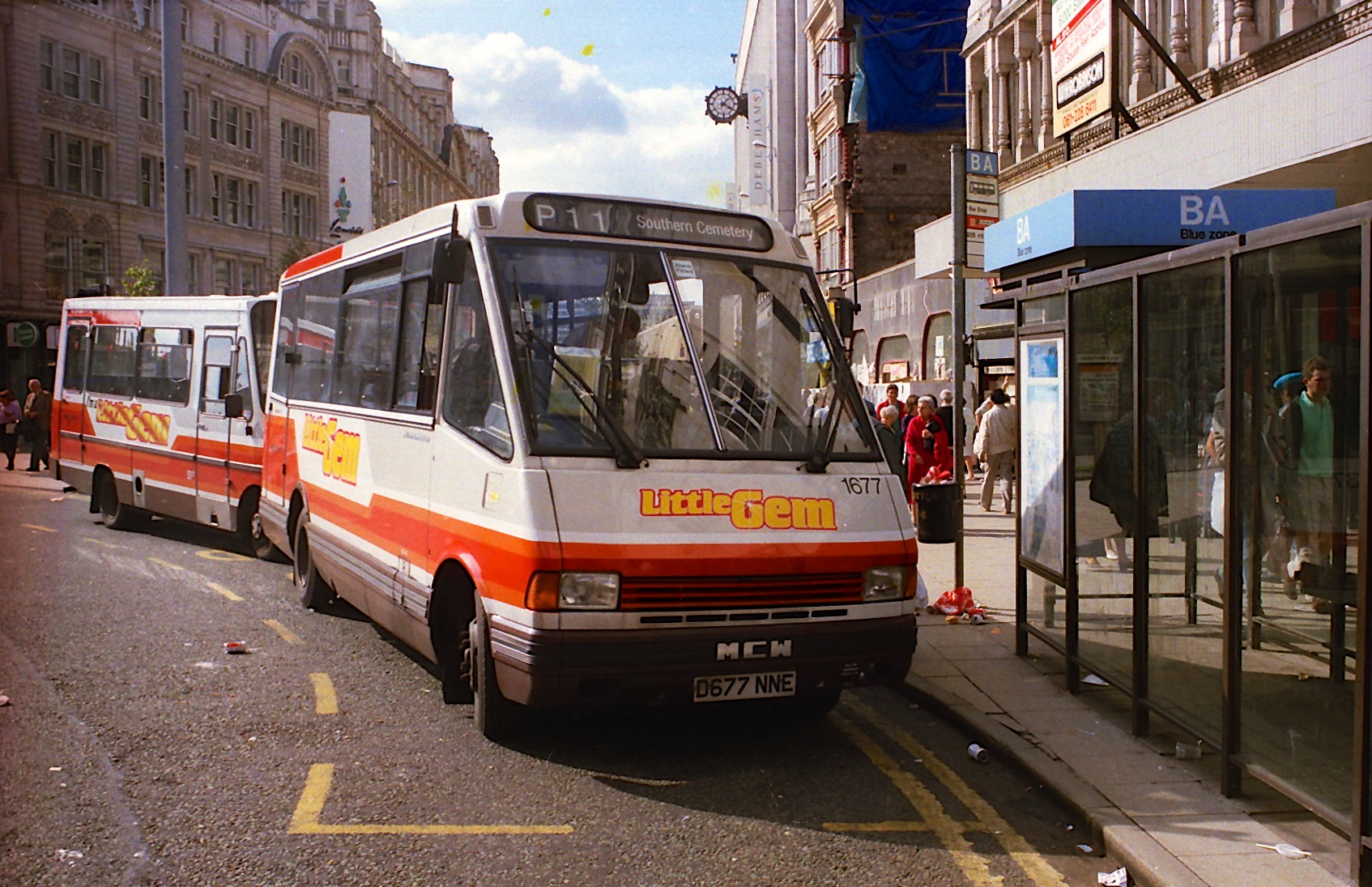
'Little Gem' MCW Metrorider in Piccadilly Gardens in 1987

On 26 October 1986, deregulation was introduced to bus services and Greater Manchester Transport was split into two. The management of service information and tendering, bus stations and stops would be run by the Greater Manchester Passenger Transport Executive (GMPTE). The bus operation would be named Greater Manchester Buses or GM Buses as it is commonly known, initially being split into North, East, South and West operational areas before these were merged into South, East and West areas in March 1987. Deregulation also saw competition introduced on several routes run by GM Buses; by March 1988, GM Buses was running 361 'Little Gem' minibuses in competition with other operators across Greater Manchester.

The competing operators included Bee Line Buzz Company, which ran several services along major routes across the Greater Manchester area; Wall's and Finglands Coachways, which introduced several services along the Wilmslow Road corridor; and Bluebird Bus & Coach and Citibus Tours, which launched several routes in the North Manchester area. Many of the companies that tried to compete with GM Buses failed, with most going out of business and some, such as Citibus Tours, being taken over by GM Buses or its immediate successors.

On 11 December 1993, GM Buses was split for sale as two separate companies, as the Government felt that they had a monopoly of bus services in the Greater Manchester area and wanted to increase competition. GM Buses was split into GM Buses North and GM Buses South. Both companies were purchased by their employees in separate employee buyouts in early 1994.

It had been hoped by splitting the companies up, GM Buses North and GM Buses South would compete against each other. However, as their names would suggest, the two companies would continue to operate mainly in their respective operating areas.

=== Competition with MTL ===
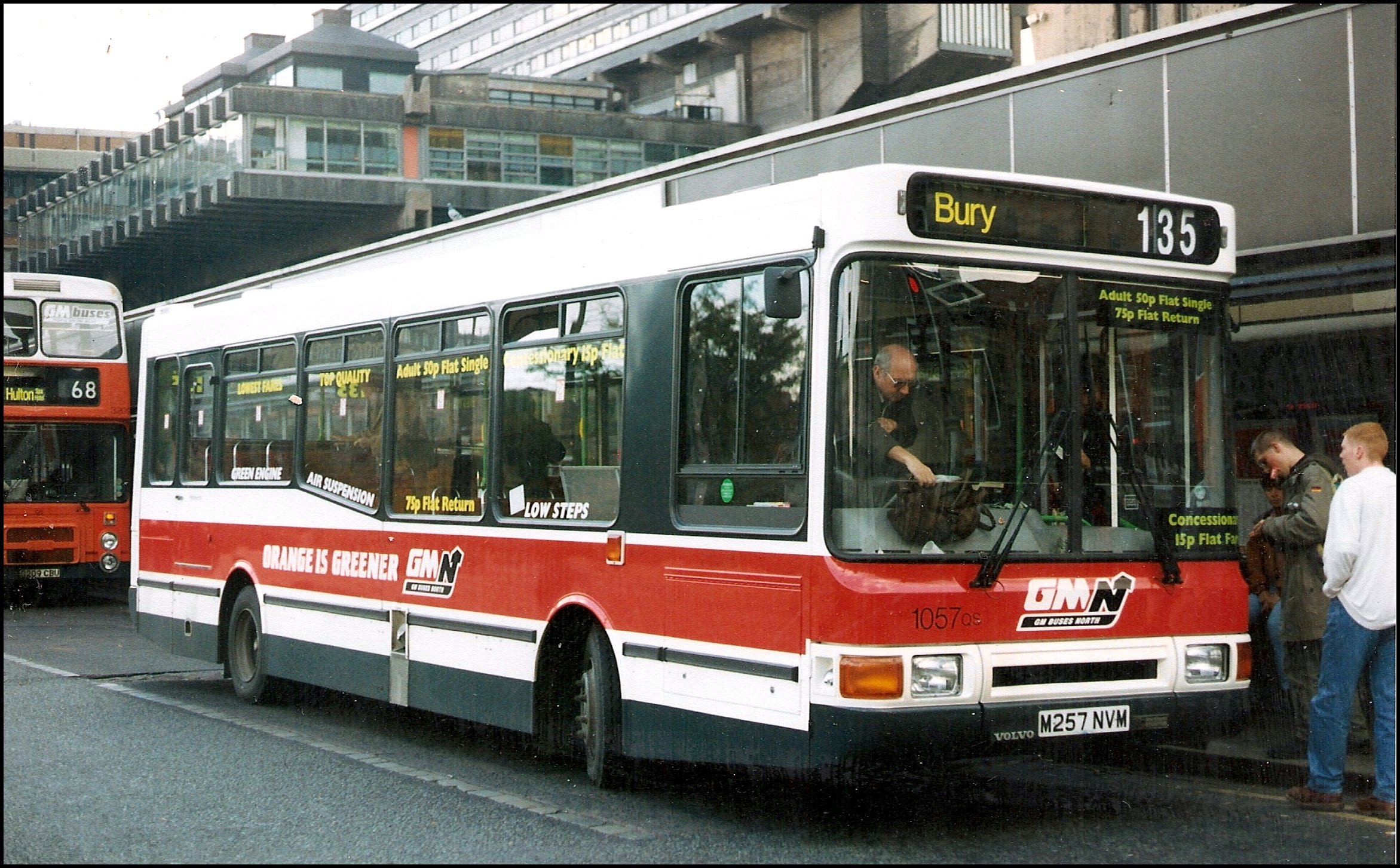
GM Buses North Northern Counties Paladin bodied Volvo B6LE at Piccadilly Gardens bus station, 1996

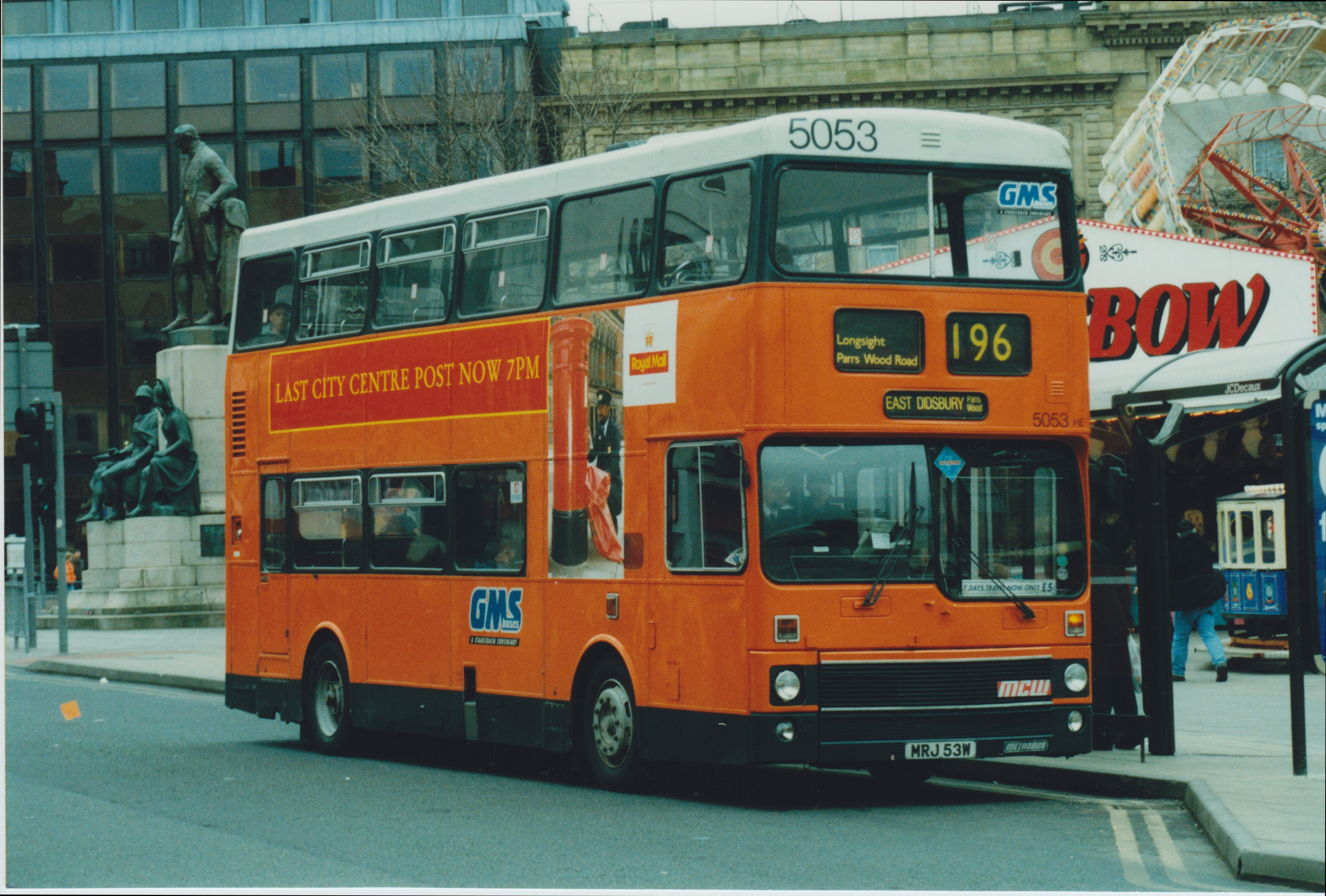
GM Buses South MCW Metrobus in central Manchester

Prior to the formation of the North/South GM Buses companies, Merseyside's dominant bus company MTL was in a phase of expansion and turned its attention to Greater Manchester. In the summer of 1993, MTL Manchester began operations from a depot in Miles Platting and added an extensive network of new or duplicated services to Manchester's already hotly contested bus market.

In October 1993, the Merseybus depot in St Helens was rebranded Lancashire Travel; a further series of new or duplicate services were introduced in the Wigan, Leigh, Bolton, Salford and North Manchester areas that Merseybus/MTL had been gradually increasing its profile in since the late 1980s. Finally, around 1993/94, MTL purchased Bolton Coachways and used their fairly substantial minibus network to further strengthen their position in the town against GM Buses North.

MTL's incursions into Greater Manchester sparked a bus war with GM Buses and predictably they retaliated with new services on Merseyside. At first, route 79 from Croxteth to Liverpool City Centre, one of Merseybus's most profitable routes, saw high-frequency GM Buses operation from September 1993 as a means to discourage further MTL expansion in Greater Manchester.

In the spring of 1994, GM Buses South formed Birkenhead & District from a depot at Cleveland Street in Birkenhead's docklands. The vehicles used a light blue and cream livery, that had slight echoes to a darker blue version used by Birkenhead Transport, and many of MTL's profitable services on the Wirral saw competition from Birkenhead & District. GM Buses North, almost besieged by MTL's Lancashire Travel operation, began further operations in Liverpool, Kirkby, Formby and Southport; it also opened a new depot, this time in Bootle, to assist its Atherton and Wigan depots in the operation of these new services on Merseyside. Furthermore, some standard GMPTE Leyland Atlanteans and Daimler Fleetlines, originally sold by GM Buses to Yorkshire Rider in 1987/88, were re-acquired by GM Buses North for use at the new depot at Bootle.

However by the summer of 1995, both MTL and the split GM Buses companies were making substantial losses. A controversial agreement was therefore signed between the three companies in June 1995. This saw MTL pull out of much of Greater Manchester, with the exception of services linking St Helens with Leigh and Wigan. Both GM Buses companies withdrew completely from Merseyside, including the long-established route 34 between Liverpool and Manchester via St Helens and Leigh, and route 320 from Liverpool to Wigan via St Helens, the latter of which had existed for decades and had origins with the Lancashire United operation.

=== Demise ===
In the first quarter of 1996, both GM Buses companies were sold by their employee shareholders. GM Buses South was purchased by Stagecoach Holdings for £40.7 million on 25 February, despite criticism from the Labour Party and protests from pensioners outside the Free Trade Hall. GM Buses South was rebranded as Stagecoach Manchester shortly after the sale, despite Stagecoach claiming that the GM Buses South brand would be retained. GM Buses North was then purchased in March by FirstBus for £47 million, later being rebranded as Greater Manchester FirstBus, with buses repainted into a deep orange livery featuring a blue stripe. By 1997, the company would be rebranded again as First Manchester, with the corporate FirstGroup livery soon being adopted.

While GM Buses South had only purchased 36 new Alexander-bodied Mercedes-Benz 811D minibuses and were leasing 20 Volvo B6 Alexander Dashes from Stagecoach at the time of their purchase, by comparison, GM Buses North had invested in 55 'Superbus'-branded Volvo B10B Wright Endurances, subsequently followed by five Volvo B10L Wright Liberators, delivered shortly after the company had been taken over by FirstBus.

In 2005, the GM Buses name was revived by UK North for use in its Manchester operations. The operator engaged in a bus war with Stagecoach Manchester on route 192, with excessive numbers of competing UK North and Stagecoach buses causing major congestion around Piccadilly Gardens bus station. Following several incidents, culminating in a UK North bus being involved in a fatal accident, the operator was banned from operating bus services in Manchester in December 2006. The directors of UK North were sentenced to 15 months in prison following an inquiry into the company's business practices, including overworking and poorly training their 130 drivers, a majority of whom had a limited understanding of English.
