= Foden NC =

Step-entrance double-decker bus chassis

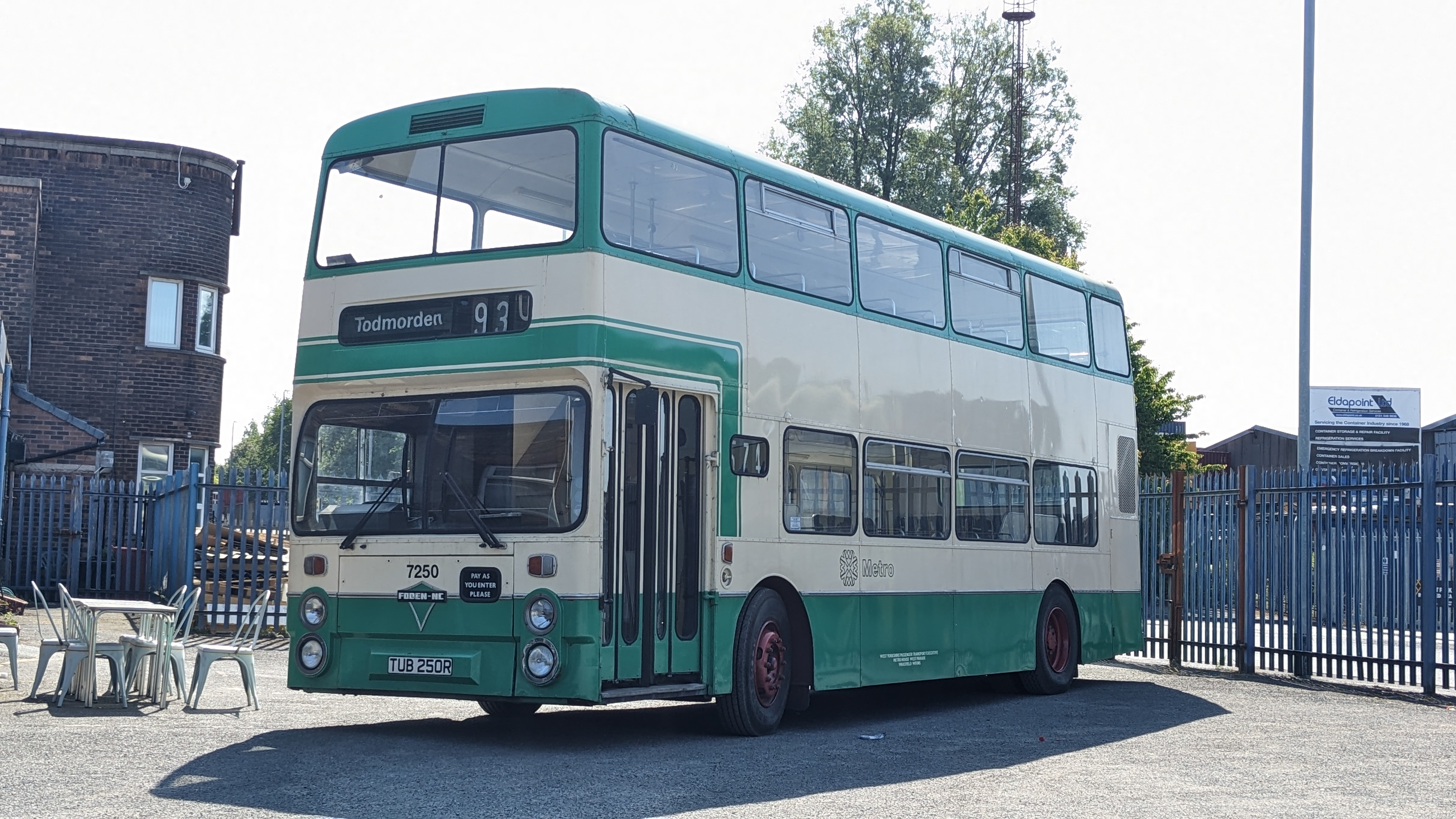
- Preserved West Yorkshire Passenger Transport Executive Foden NC in Kirkby in June 2023

Overview
- Manufacturer: Foden; Northern Counties
- Production: 1976–1978
- Assembly: Chassis; Sandbach, Cheshire, England; Body; Wigan, Greater Manchester, England

Body and chassis
- Doors: 1 or 2
- Floor type: Step entrance
- Chassis: Steel ladder frame

Powertrain
- Engine: Gardner 6LXB
- Power output: 184 brake horsepower (137 kW)
- Transmission: Allison MT640 Torque converter

Dimensions
- Length: 9.5 metres (31 ft)
- Width: 2.5 metres (8 ft 2 in)
- Height: 4.1–4.4 metres (13–14 ft)
- Curb weight: Around 10 tonnes (10,000 kg)

The Foden NC was a double-decker bus chassis built in partnership between Foden of Sandbach and Northern Counties of Wigan between 1976 and 1978.

== Background ==
Foden was primarily a truck manufacturer, although it had also built bus chassis as late as the 1950s, whilst Northern Counties was a bus body manufacturer actively building bodywork onto chassis produced by other companies. At the time of the Foden NC's conception, British Leyland had by far the largest share of the market for double-decker buses in the United Kingdom, with its Atlantean, Fleetline and Bristol VR models.

The Foden NC was intended to compete against these for a share of this market, with a joint venture being agreed between Foden and Northern Counties to develop the new vehicle. Northern Counties saw the Foden NC as a potential replacement for the Fleetline in the event British Leyland stopped supplying bus chassis and shifted production to the new integrally-bodied Leyland Titan.

== Design ==
The Foden NC was a semi-integral design, meaning that it has an underframe (chassis), but that the bodywork is also structurally load-bearing. Standard Northern Counties bodywork was similar to the GM Standard-style bodywork built on other rear-engined chassis, albeit being slightly longer and featuring a variant of Foden's 'kite' badge on the front panel, however the chassis was also made available for other manufacturers to body.

The Foden NC was designed with the intention for a long service life and for ease of maintenance. As standard, Foden NCs were equipped with Gardner 6LXB engines, Allison MT640 automatic transmissions and Ferodo retarders. However, the transmission proved to be a weakness, with the Foden transfer box being prone to failures and the Allison gearbox inefficient. Derby City Transport refitted its Foden NC with Voith transmission in an attempt to overcome the problems.

== Production ==
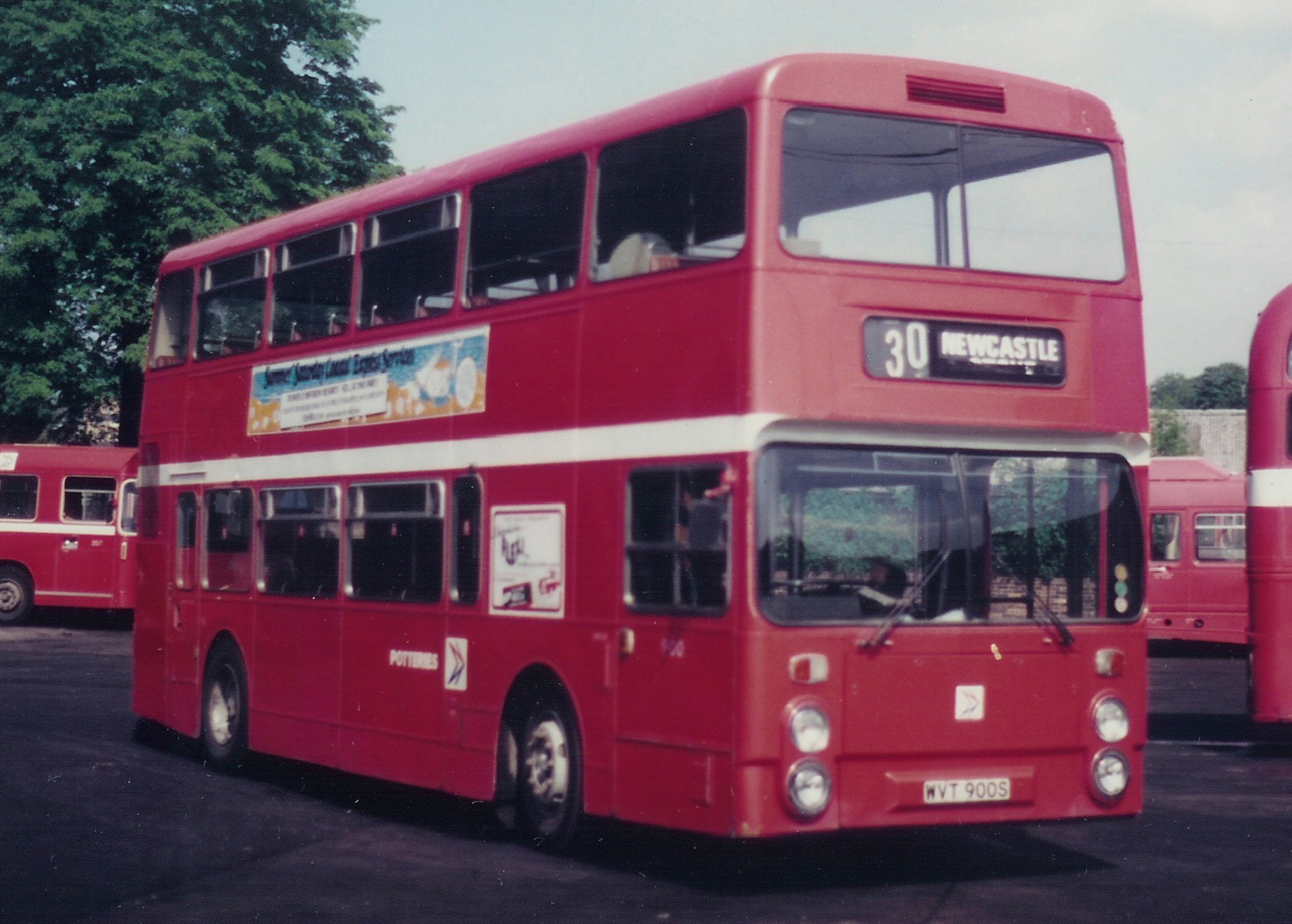
Potteries Motor Traction Foden NC, the only example built for a National Bus Company subsidiary

Only seven prototype vehicles were completed, with an eighth, partially completed bus used by Foden for testing alternative chassis types. The Greater Manchester Passenger Transport Executive purchased two, one of which had been used by Foden as an experimental testbed, while one each was delivered to three of Britain's passenger transport executives in West Yorkshire, the West Midlands, and South Yorkshire, the latter of which was the only Foden NC built with an East Lancs dual-door body. The other two buyers were municipally-owned Derby City Transport and National Bus Company subsidiary Potteries Motor Traction (PMT), each purchasing one. Ten were provisionally ordered by Cleveland Transit, however the deal fell through following Foden's takeover by Paccar, with Cleveland instead ordering Dennis Dominators.

Production of the Foden NC ceased around the time Foden Trucks entered receivership due to an economic downturn, which coincided with a crowded market for new double-decker chassis including products such as the Dennis Dominator, the Leyland Olympian and Titan, the MCW Metrobus and the Volvo Ailsa B55 and Citybus. Chassis manufacturing rigs and facilities initially retained by Northern Counties in the event demand for the Foden NC chassis arose. Most of the vehicles experienced shorter than average working lives, although the two supplied to the West Midlands and West Yorkshire PTEs still exist in preservation, while the sole NBC example was scrapped by PMT's successor First Potteries in late 2000 after a long period in outside storage.
