= MRM Health NV =

Belgian clinical-stage biopharmaceutical company

MRM Health NV is a clinical-stage biopharmaceutical company that develops microbiome-based live biotherapeutic products for the treatment of chronic inflammatory diseases and to augment immune-oncology therapies. Founded in 2020 as a carve-out from ProDigest and a spin-off from the Flanders Institute for Biotechnology (VIB) and Ghent University. MRM Health is developing MH002, a microbial consortium candidate for the treatment of ulcerative colitis, and operates a proprietary co-fermentation platform CORAL.

== History ==
The technology underlying MRM Health originates from microbiome research carried out in Ghent. ProDigest, founded in 2008 by Sam Possemiers and Massimo Marzorati, developed in vitro gut models and strain‑selection methods that informed the rational design of microbial consortia. MRM Health was established in 2020 as a carve-out from ProDigest and a translational spin‑off from VIB and Ghent University to advance these discoveries toward clinical development.

In 2020, the company completed a Series A financing round of approximately €14 million, with participation from Ackermans & van Haaren (AvH), DuPont Nutrition & Biosciences (now IFF), OMX Europe Venture Fund (comprising Korys and Merieux Equity Partners), QBIC II, VIB and company management.

In 2020 MRM Health entered a collaboration with DuPont Nutrition & Biosciences (later IFF) to explore microbiome solutions for metabolic disease programs.

In 2025, the company closed a €55 million Series B financing round led by Biocodex, with new investors also including Athos, SFPIM and BNP Paribas Private Fortis Equity. It announced a strategic development and manufacturing agreement with Biocodex to support clinical development and scale-up of its CORAL platform.

== Research and technology ==
MRM Health develops live biotherapeutic products composed of defined bacterial consortia that are intended to restore microbial balance, strengthen intestinal barrier function, and modulate immune responses. The company’s proprietary CORAL platform enables co‑fermentation of multiple bacterial strains in a single process, producing a homogeneous drug substance intended to be scalable and manufacturable to GMP standards.

=== MH002 ===
MH002 is MRM Health’s lead programme: a rationally designed six-strain microbial consortium developed for the treatment of ulcerative colitis. The product is intended to restore a healthy gut microbial balance, reinforce the intestinal barrier and rebalance immune activity without broad immunosuppression. Early clinical studies including Phase 2a trials in ulcerative colitis and the orphan condition pouchitis reportedly demonstrated a favorable safety profile and preliminary signs of efficacy. A 204-patient Phase 2b sutdy (STARFISH-UC) is currently running across US and EU to further confirm the efficacy and favorable safety profile of MH002 in ulcerative colitis patients.

=== Other programs ===
Beyond MH002, MRM Health is developing additional consortia for Crohn’s disease and metabolic disorders, and exploring applications to enhance cancer immunotherapies (immune‑oncology). The company also maintains research activities in animal health in collaboration with partners. Several preclinical and IND‑enabling programmes are reported to be in development.
