= Plaxton Prestige =

Low-floor bus body on DAF SB220 and Volvo B10BLE chassis

Plaxton Prestige Northern Counties Paladin LF
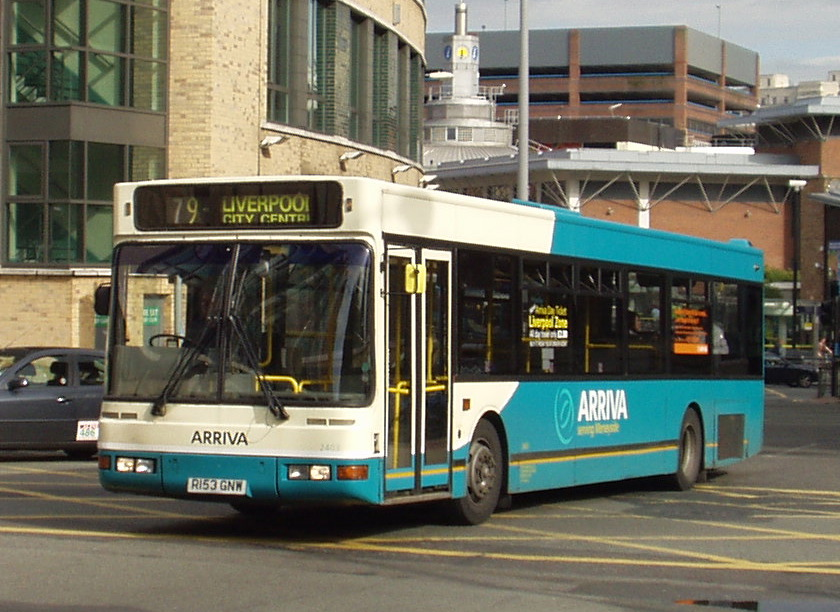
- Arriva North West and Wales Prestige bodied DAF SB220 in Liverpool in 2007

Overview
- Manufacturer: Northern Counties (1995–1997); Plaxton (1997–1999)
- Production: 1995–1999
- Assembly: Wigan, Greater Manchester, England (1995–1997); Scarborough, North Yorkshire, England (1997–1999)

Body and chassis
- Doors: 1 or 2
- Floor type: Low floor
- Chassis: DAF SB220; Volvo B10BLE

Powertrain
- Engine: DAF ATi 8.6L GS160M; Volvo DH10A-245 9.6L
- Capacity: 35 to 42 seated
- Power output: 218bhp (DAF); 245bhp (Volvo)
- Transmission: ZF 4HP500 (automatic); ZF 5HP500 (automatic)

Dimensions
- Length: 11.9 m (39 ft)
- Width: 2.55 m (8 ft 4 in)
- Height: 3.0 m (9.8 ft)
- Curb weight: 9,615 kg (21,197 lb)

Chronology
- Predecessor: Northern Counties Paladin
- Successor: Plaxton Pointer 2

The Plaxton Prestige (previously known as Northern Counties Paladin) is a low-floor single-decker bus body built by manufacturers Northern Counties and Plaxton between 1995–1997 (Northern Counties) and 1997–1999 (Plaxton).

== Design ==
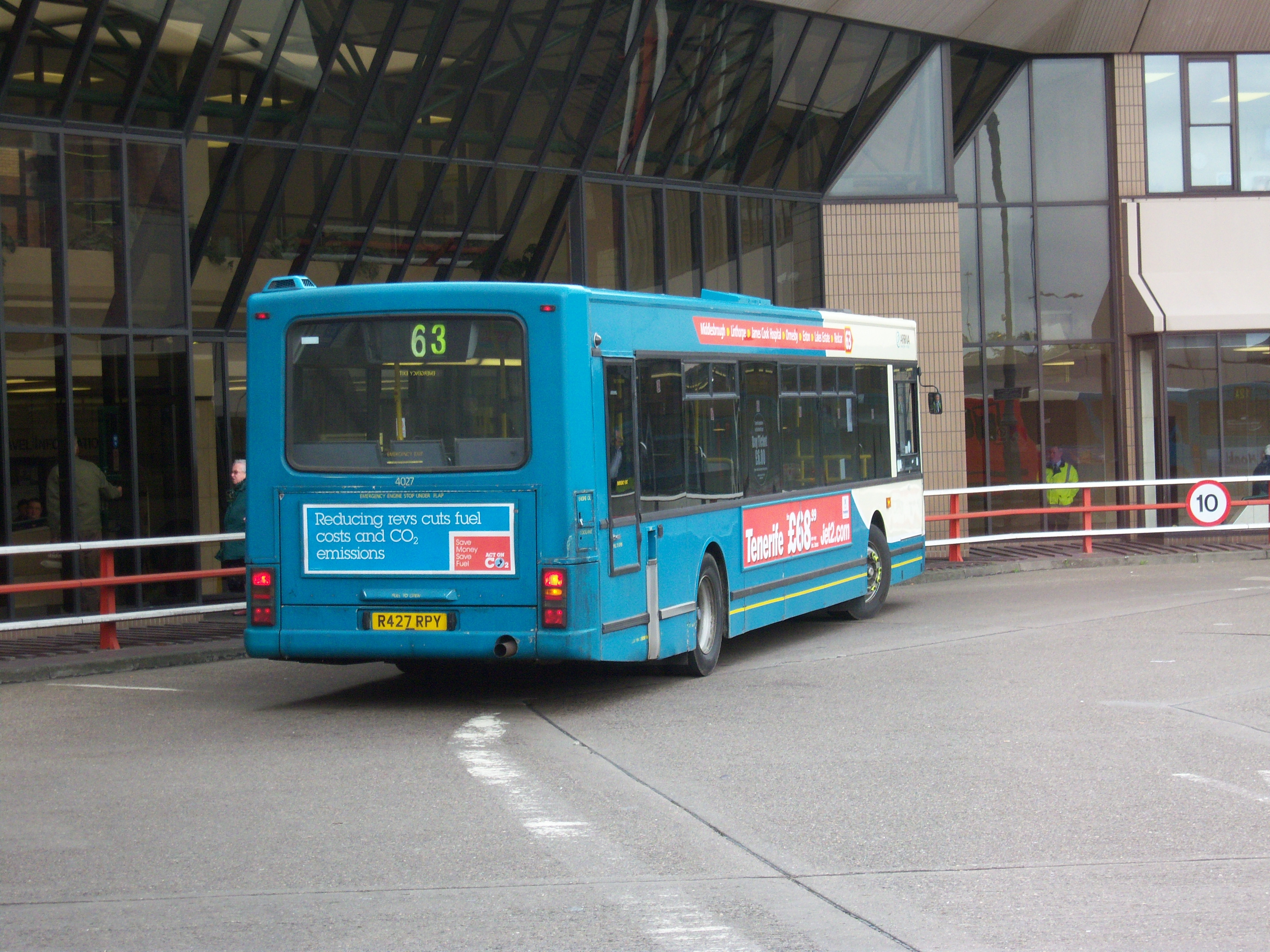
Rear of a Arriva North East Plaxton Prestige bodied DAF SB220 in Middlesbrough bus station in May 2009

Northern Counties, who had then been recently purchased by the Henlys Group, developed a body then known as the Paladin LF to be the low-floor successor to their step-entrance Paladin, with the bus first being unveiled at the Coach & Bus '95 expo by the manufacturer. Production of the Paladin LF transferred to Plaxton's Scarborough factory during 1997, with the model also renamed to the Prestige, a name that had earlier been briefly used for an export variant of the Plaxton Excalibur. In Plaxton's body numbering system, the letter H identified the Prestige, although not all Prestiges received a Plaxton body number, with early models being numbered in the Northern Counties series.

Some Plaxton Prestiges on DAF SB220 chassis were powered by liquefied petroleum gas (LPG) as part of early developments into the manufacture of zero-emissions buses. Storage tanks for the LPG fuel were located on the roof of the Prestige body. These LPG Prestiges were demonstrated by a number of operators, including Mainline Buses and East Yorkshire Motor Services, and though a handful of orders resulted, diesel-powered SB220s would be preferred throughout the Prestige's production run. Production of the Prestige ceased in 1999 in favour of the lighter Super Pointer Dart variant of the Plaxton Pointer 2, with only 150 Prestiges having been built.

== Operators ==
Two years after the Paladin LF was launched by Northern Counties, the first production models entered service with Stagecoach Manchester in March 1997, with five built on Volvo B10BLE chassis - the only Prestiges built on the chassis - being delivered to the operator.

The largest operator of Prestiges on DAF SB220 chassis was Arriva, with multiple examples delivered to the group's subsidiaries throughout the Prestige's production run, 54 of which entered service with companies today grouped under the Arriva North East name. Nine Prestiges equipped with coach seats also entered service with Arriva The Shires on Green Line service 724 in early 1998, while smaller numbers of Prestige bodied DAF SB200s entered service with Go North East.

Another large operator of Prestiges on DAF SB220 chassis was the National Express-owned Speedlink Airport Services, taking delivery of 19 dual-doored Prestiges equipped with extra luggage capacity in early 1998 for use on the temporary FastLink shuttle service between Heathrow Airport and the short-lived Heathrow Junction railway station.

== See also ==
- List of buses
