= Northern Counties Paladin =

Single-decker bus body

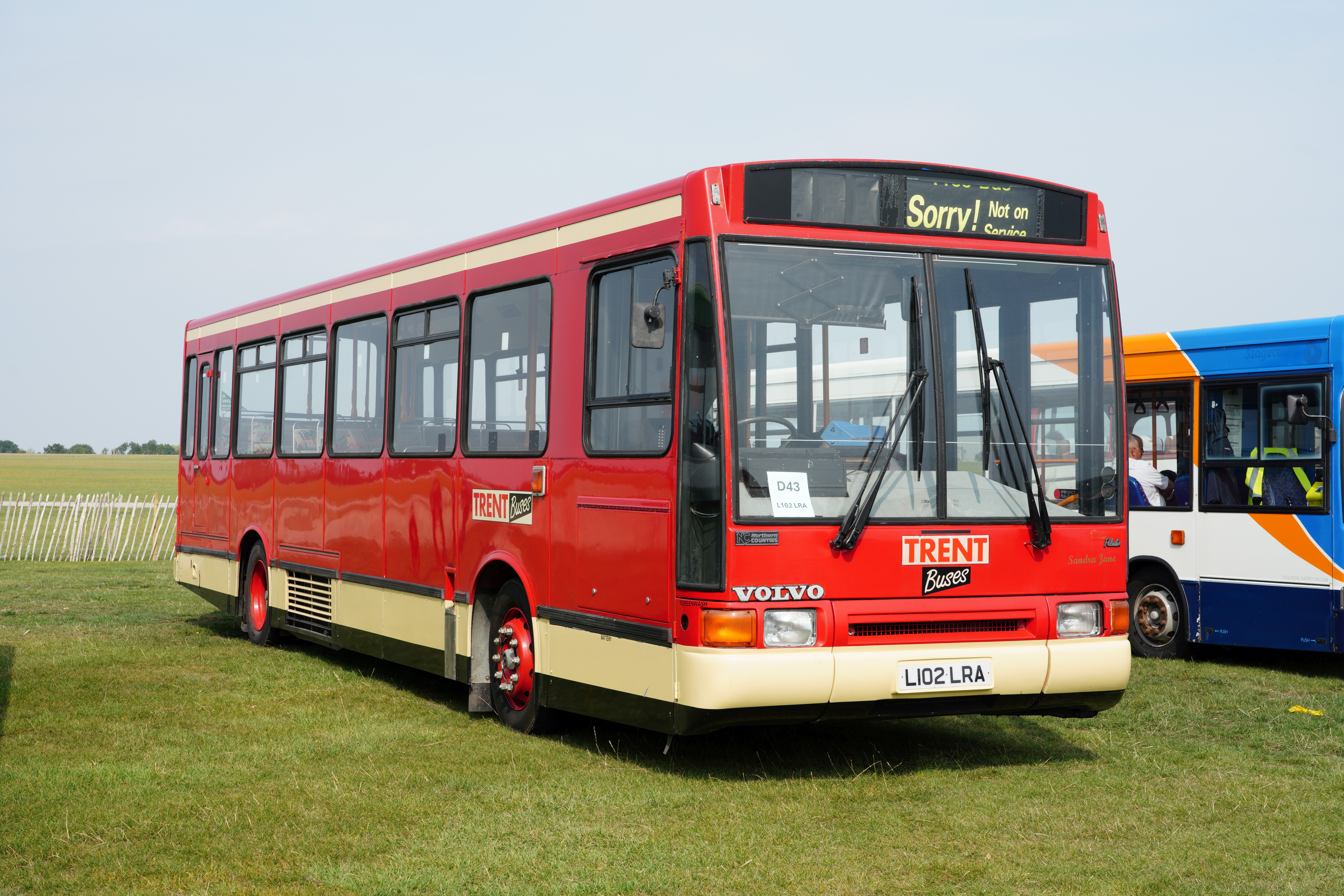
- Preserved Northern Counties Paladin-bodied Volvo B10B, former Trent Barton bus 102

Overview
- Manufacturer: Northern Counties; Plaxton
- Production: 1991–1998
- Assembly: Wigan, United Kingdom

Body and chassis
- Doors: 1 or 2
- Floor type: Step entrance
- Chassis: Volvo B10M; Volvo B10B; Volvo B6; Dennis Dart; Dennis Lance; Dennis Falcon; Scania L113; DAF SB220; Leyland Atlantean (rebodies)

Powertrain
- Capacity: 27 to 45 seated

Dimensions
- Length: 8.5m to 12.0m
- Width: 3.1m
- Height: 3.4m

Chronology
- Successor: Plaxton Prestige; Plaxton Pointer

The Northern Counties Paladin, also badged as the Plaxton Paladin towards the end of production, is a step-entrance single-decker bus body built by Northern Counties of Wigan, UK, between 1991 and 1998. The replacements for the Paladin are the Prestige and the Pointer as low-floor models for the Paladin LF.

== Description ==
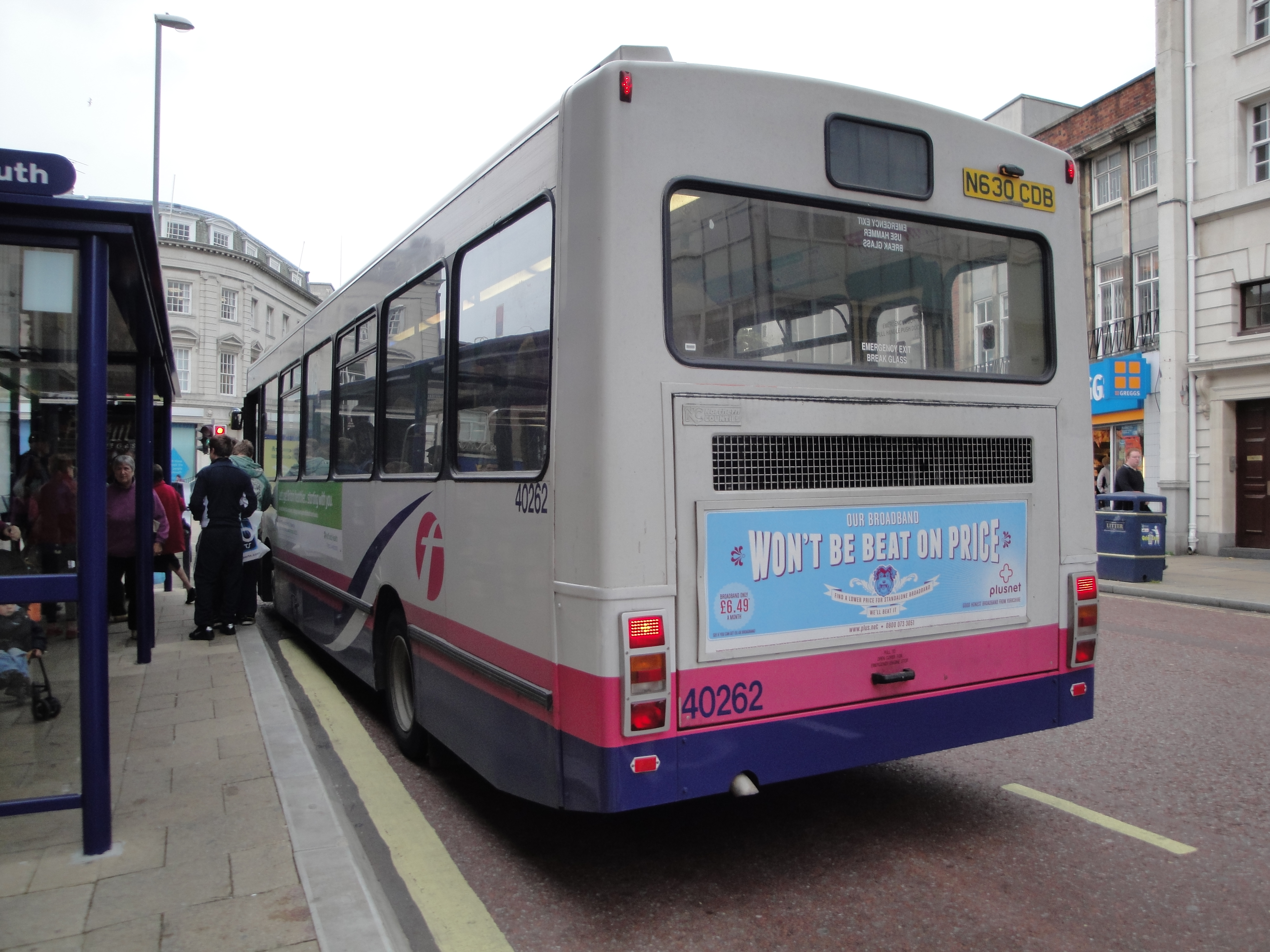
Paladin rear

Development of the Northern Counties Paladin commenced in 1990. Upon its launch in 1991, the Paladin could be bodied on the Dennis Dart and Lance, Scania L113 and Volvo B10M chassis; bodies for the Iveco TurboCity chassis were envisaged but not produced, while the DAF SB220, Dennis Falcon, Volvo B6 and Volvo B10B chassis were later added to the Paladin range. Some bodies built towards the end of production were given Plaxton body numbers, in which the Paladin was identified by the letter G.

In London, Metroline took delivery of 31 Paladin-bodied Dennis Lances and London General took delivery of 13 Paladin-bodied Volvo B10Bs for service on route 88 in 1993, receiving branding for "The Clapham Omnibus", followed by 19 Paladin-bodied Dennis Darts delivered to London Northern for service on 'Camden Link' route C2 in 1994.

Leicester Citybus were the only operator to take delivery of Northern Counties Paladin-bodied Dennis Falcons, taking delivery of three in 1992 and an additional four in 1993, which were the final Dennis Falcons produced.

A Paladin-bodied Volvo B6 was purpose-built by Northern Counties and fire engine manufacturer Saxon Sanbec as a £150,000 (equivalent to £283,000 in 2023) mobile command post for the Greater Manchester County Fire Service in 1997.

=== Leyland Atlantean rebodies ===
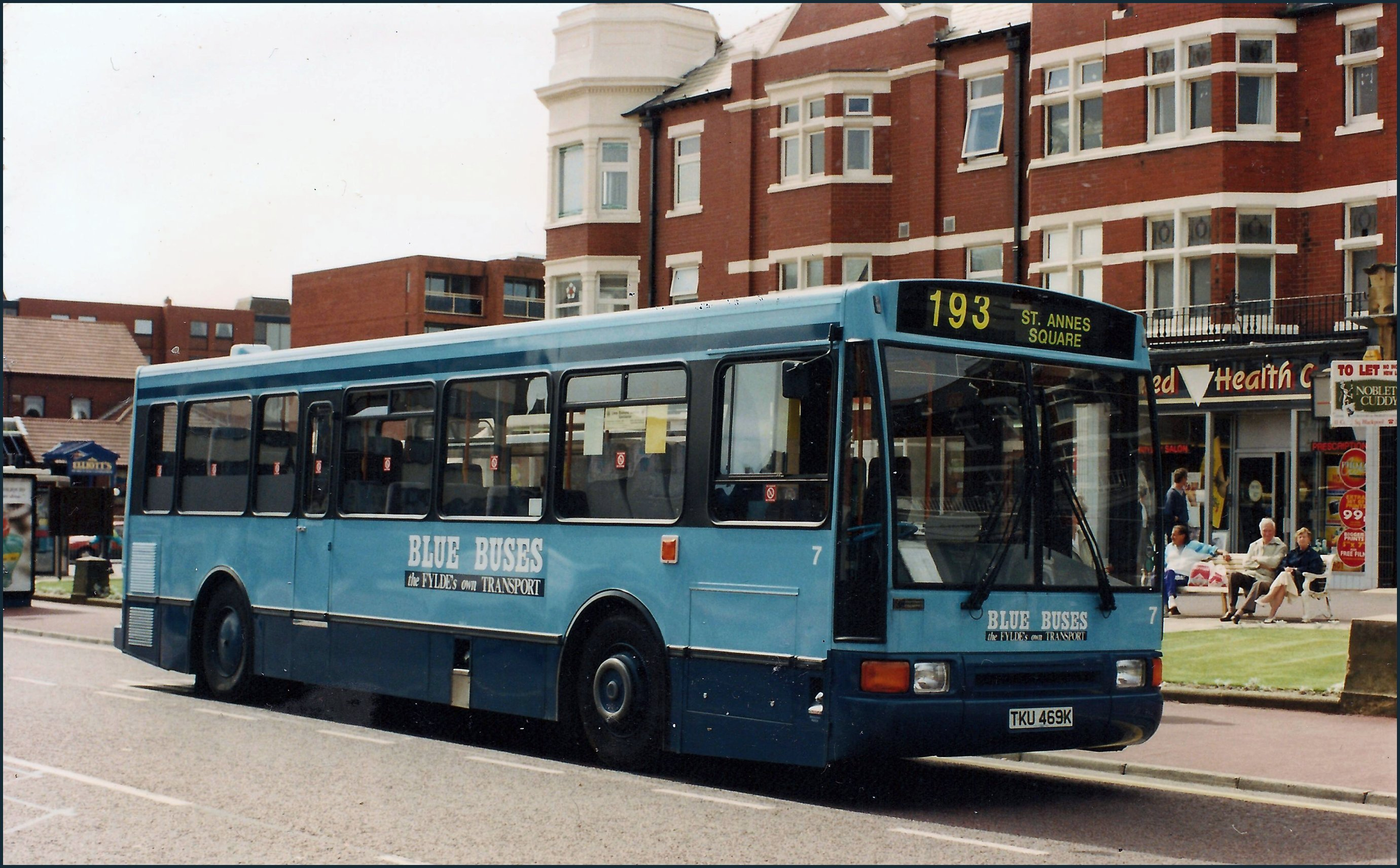
A Northern Counties Paladin rebodied Leyland Atlantean in Blackpool

Northern Counties received a contract from Fylde Borough Transport in 1993 to rebody four 33 ft (10 m) Leyland Atlantean double-decker buses new to the Bradford Corporation in 1971. After the buses were acquired from Kingston upon Hull City Transport, their double-deck bodies were removed at a scrapyard prior to the Atlantean chassis being fitted with custom-made Paladin bodies by Northern Counties. The front ends of the Paladin rebody were taken from the Volvo B10B bodies while the back ends were taken from the Dennis Dart bodies, and an emergency exit was relocated towards the middle of the offside to provide a maximum seating capacity of 42 passengers.

Fylde Borough Transport fitted new springs and brake drums to the Atlantean chassis, as well as reconditioning the engines, which were fitted with a custom-built 'turbocharger' consisting of two Clayton heater blowers that provided a continuous boost through the inlet manifold, boosting the acceleration of the bus at low revs. Radiators were moved to the front and replaced with units from Albion Clydesdale trucks. Spring-release handbrakes were also fitted, and the Atlantean's exhaust systems were rerouted across their engines and replaced by a system from Leyland Leopard coaches. The refurbishment of each bus, including the Northern Counties Paladin rebody, would cost up to £55,000 (equivalent to £113,278 in 2023).

=== Windscreen variants ===
Three different shapes of windscreen were fitted to Paladins. One was of gentle "barrel shaped" curvature, with deep quarterlights. This was used throughout the production run, being fitted to both the earliest vehicles and to the last batches built. An upright "wrap-around" screen was used on the majority of midi-sized Paladin bodies (on Dennis Dart and Volvo B6 chassis), whilst a double-curvature screen was fitted to some Scania L113 and DAF SB220 full-sized vehicles.

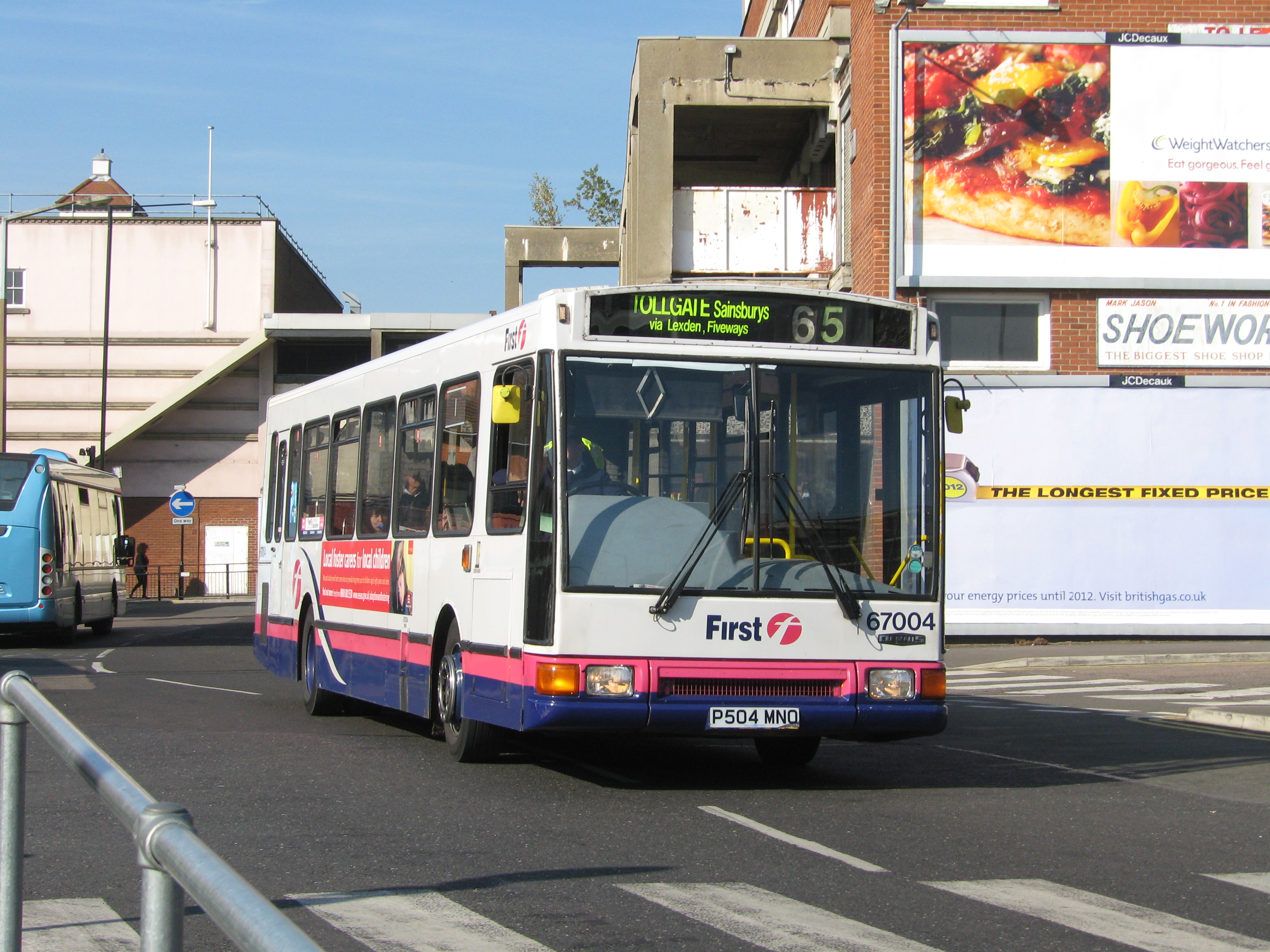
A Paladin body with the barrel screen and quarterlights, on Dennis Dart chassis.

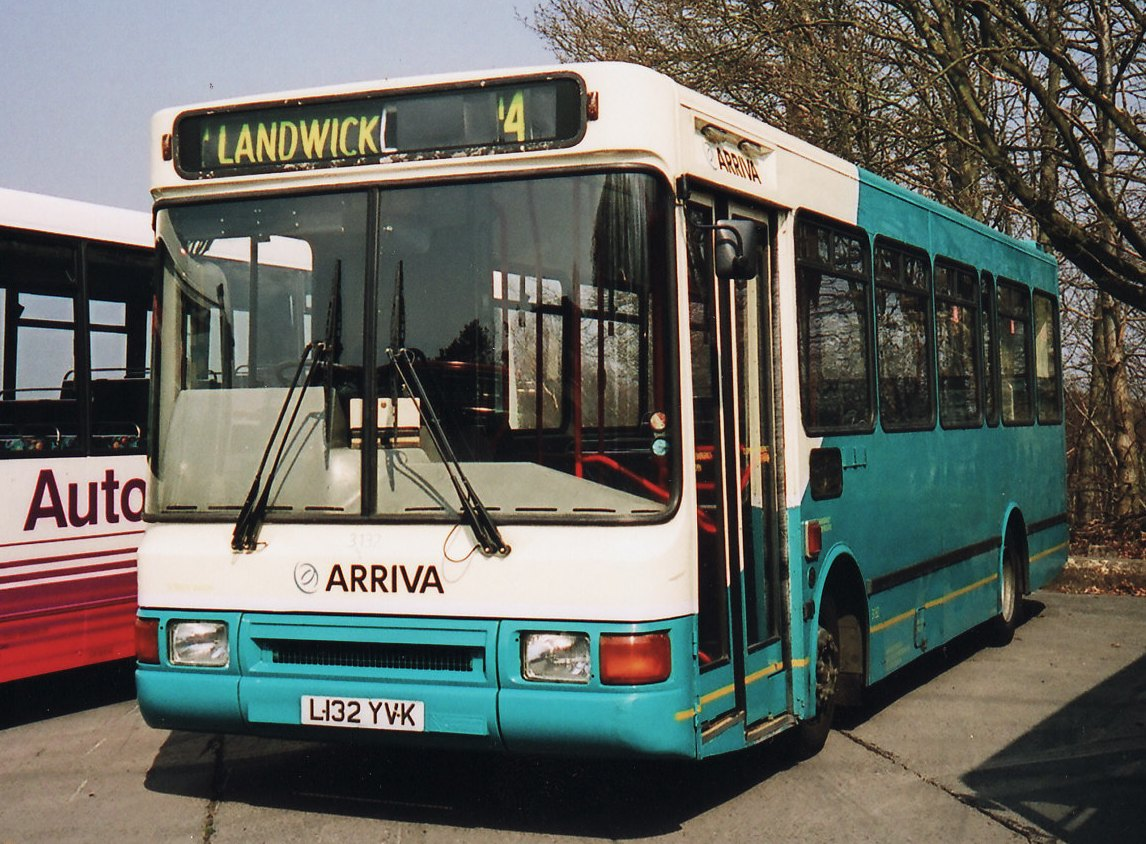
A Paladin body with the upright "wrap-around" screen, on Dennis Dart chassis.

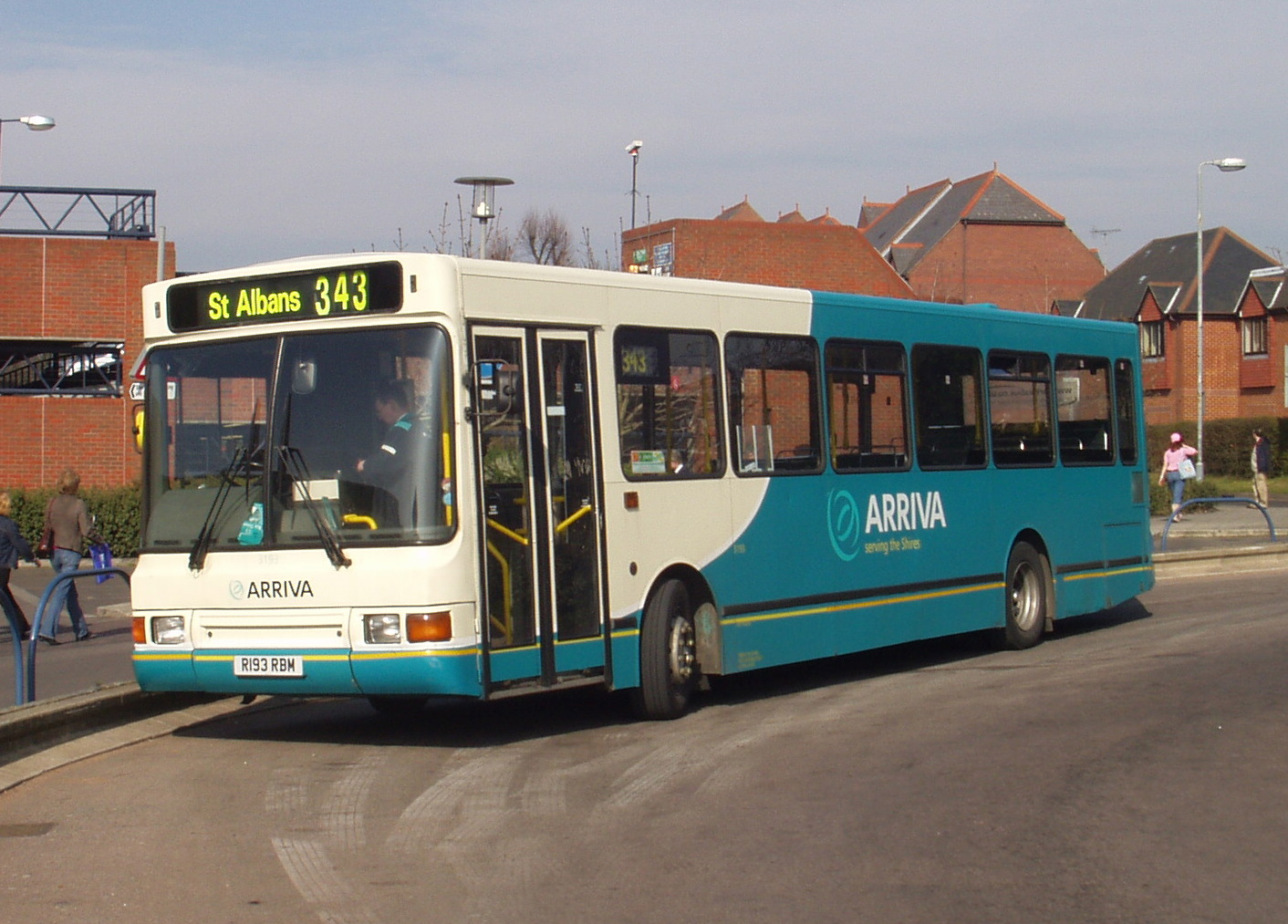
A Paladin body with the double-curvature screen, on Scania L113 chassis.

== See also ==
- East Lancs EL2000, a similarly versatile single-deck body built on many chassis, including the Leyland Atlantean, by East Lancashire Coachbuilders
- List of buses
