= GM Standard double-decker bus =

Double-decker bus bodywork exclusive to Greater Manchester

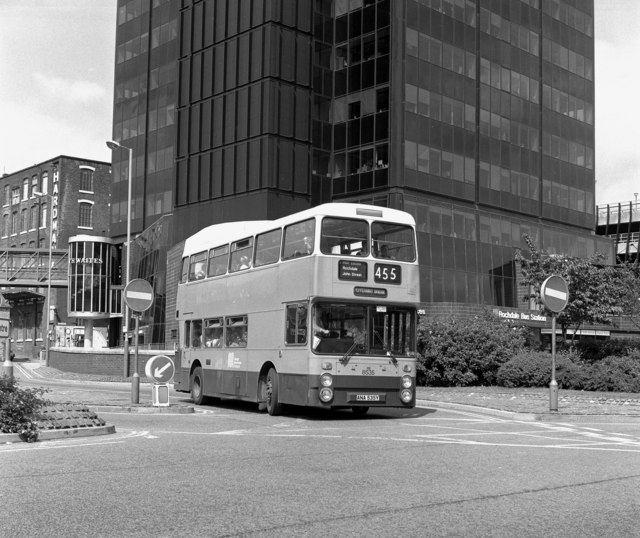
- Northern Counties GM Standard bodied Leyland Atlantean departing Rochdale bus station in 1984

Overview
- Manufacturer: Park Royal; Northern Counties

Body and chassis
- Doors: 1 or 2
- Floor type: Step-entrance
- Chassis: Leyland Atlantean; Daimler Fleetline

Dimensions
- Length: 9.0 to 10.6 m (29 ft 6 in to 34 ft 9 in)
- Width: 2.5 m (8 ft 2 in)
- Height: 4.4 m (14 ft 5 in)

The GM Standard double-decker bus, also known internally as the 7000 series, was a double-decker bus body designed by SELNEC PTE on the Leyland Atlantean and Daimler Fleetline chassis and operated by both SELNEC and Lancashire United Transport, as well as their successor, the Greater Manchester Passenger Transport Executive. Derived from the Mancunian double-decker bus design built for the Manchester Corporation on the same two chassis, no fewer than 1,231 standards were delivered to SELNEC, Greater Manchester Transport and Lancashire United.

The first prototype 'GM Standard', a Leyland Atlantean AN68 registered VNB 101L and numbered 7001, was delivered to SELNEC PTE with a body built by Park Royal Vehicles in 1972, accompanied by an order for 200 more by the operator. The bus featured a single entrance door operated by pedal and a front staircase behind the driver's cab, in contrast to the previous Mancunian design having two sets of doors and a central staircase, and also featured a 'periscope' for viewing the top deck. Provision was also made for the fitment of an internal public address system and a UHF two-way radio in the driver's cab.

In 1974, a new revision of the 'GM Standard', internally codenamed the '7000 1a', was launched by Greater Manchester PTE. This design, initially launched on a Northern Counties bodied Daimler Fleetline, saw the flat two-piece windscreen replaced by a raked design that curved to the top of the lower-deck in order to keep the front of the bus cleaner. Internally, the gear-changing and handbrake layout was rearranged to the right-hand side of the cab in the style of the Leyland National integral single-deck bus, tachographs were made available to be fitted, and an engine fire extinguisher, two-speed fans for the passenger heater and demister system, and sliding rear lower-deck windows were also specified.

Withdrawals of 'GM Standard' double-deckers began in 1986 following the creation of arms-length company GM Buses ahead of bus deregulation in Great Britain during October. Over 450 buses, including many 'GM Standards', became redundant as a result of deregulation, and many of the fleet were distributed second-hand to various operators across England, Scotland and Wales with the assistance of used commercial vehicle dealer Kirkby Central. The last 'GM Standard' Fleetline operated by a successor of GMPTE was withdrawn by First Manchester on 6 January 1999, with the last Atlantean following on 7 January 2002.

== See also ==
- Mancunian double-decker bus, the direct predecessor of the 'GM Standard' design
