= Northern Counties (bus manufacturer) =

Bus and coach bodywork company

Northern Counties Motor & Engineering Company
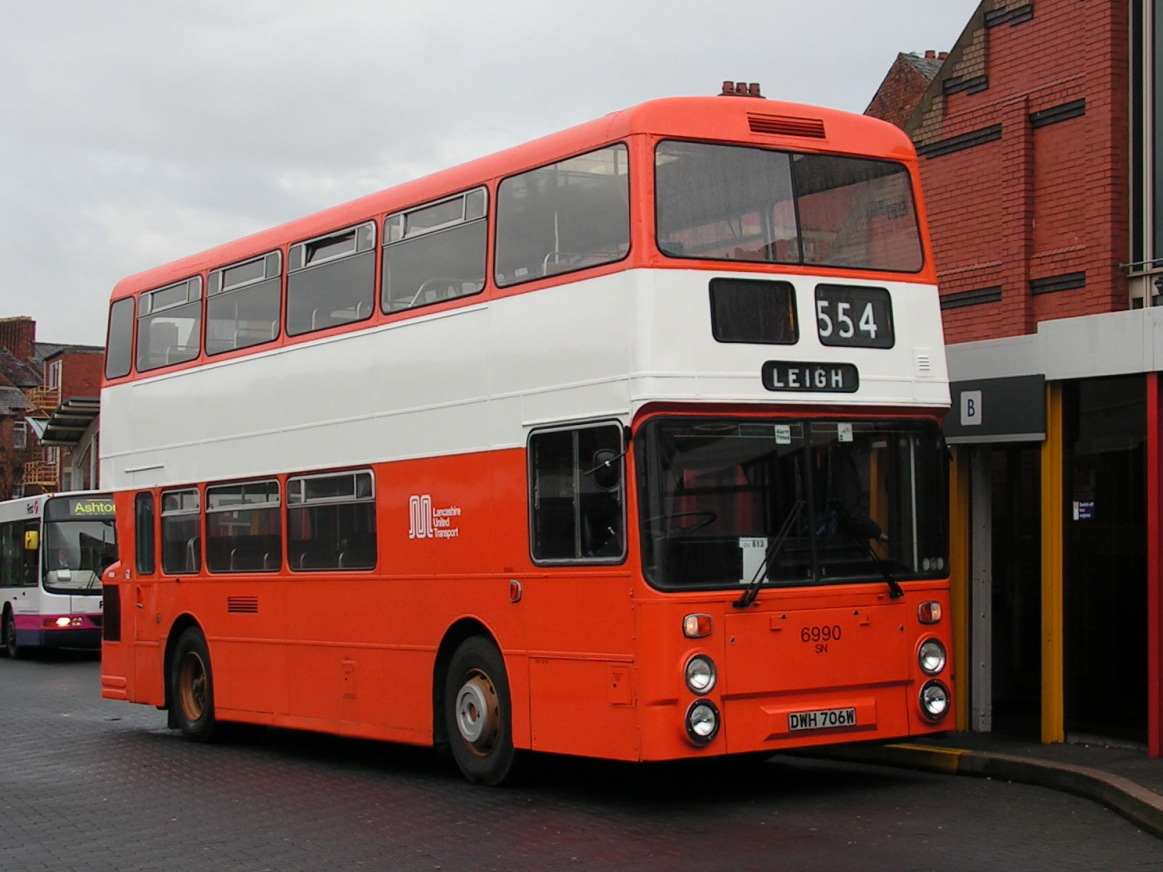
- Preserved Lancashire United Transport Northern Counties bodied Daimler Fleetline
- Company type: Private (until 1983); Subsidiary (1983–1999)
- Traded as: Northern Counties
- Industry: Bus manufacturing
- Founded: 11 November 1919; 106 years ago
- Founder: Henry Lewis
- Defunct: 1999; 27 years ago
- Fate: Merged into Plaxton
- Successor: TransBus International
- Headquarters: Pemberton, Wigan, England
- Parent: Greater Manchester PTE (1983–1991); Henlys Group (1995–1999)

The Northern Counties Motor & Engineering Company was an English builder of bus and coach bodywork based in Pemberton in Wigan, Greater Manchester.

== History ==
Northern Counties Motor & Engineering Company was founded in Wigan on 11 November 1919 by Henry Lewis. The Lewis family remained owners of the company until it was bought out over seventy years later. As was common at the time, early products were bodywork and repairs for private automobiles together with a tyre fitting service. By the early 1920s, the private automobile work had ceased and the manufacture of bodywork for service buses commenced. Bodywork was for both single and double deck vehicles. Very few coaches were produced.

During World War II, Northern Counties was authorised by the government to produce bus bodies to a utility specification, mainly using steel-framed construction.

Northern Counties established a loyal client base and reputation for quality construction in the post-war years. Notable clients included local operators SHMD Board, Manchester Corporation and Lancashire United Transport. Further afield, Barton Transport and Southdown Motor Services were among a number of regular customers.

=== 1960s ===
In 1967, fellow bodybuilder Massey Brothers, located in nearby Pemberton, was acquired and became a part of the Northern Counties operations. The Massey factory was retained and used as a paint-shop and for final completion of bodywork assembled at Wigan Lane.

The Transport Act 1968 merged the municipal corporations of Manchester, Salford, Bolton, Oldham, Stockport, Rochdale, Bury and Stalybridge, Hyde, Mossley and Dukinfield Joint Board (SHMD Board). The resulting conglomerate was known as the Southeast Lancashire Northeast Cheshire Passenger Transport Authority, commonly known as SELNEC. SELNEC was faced with a fleet of 2,500 vehicles consisting of a wide variety of types and manufacturers, reflecting the preferences of their former municipal owners. Northern Counties worked closely with SELNEC to develop a standard bus for fleet replacement.

=== 1970s-1991 ===
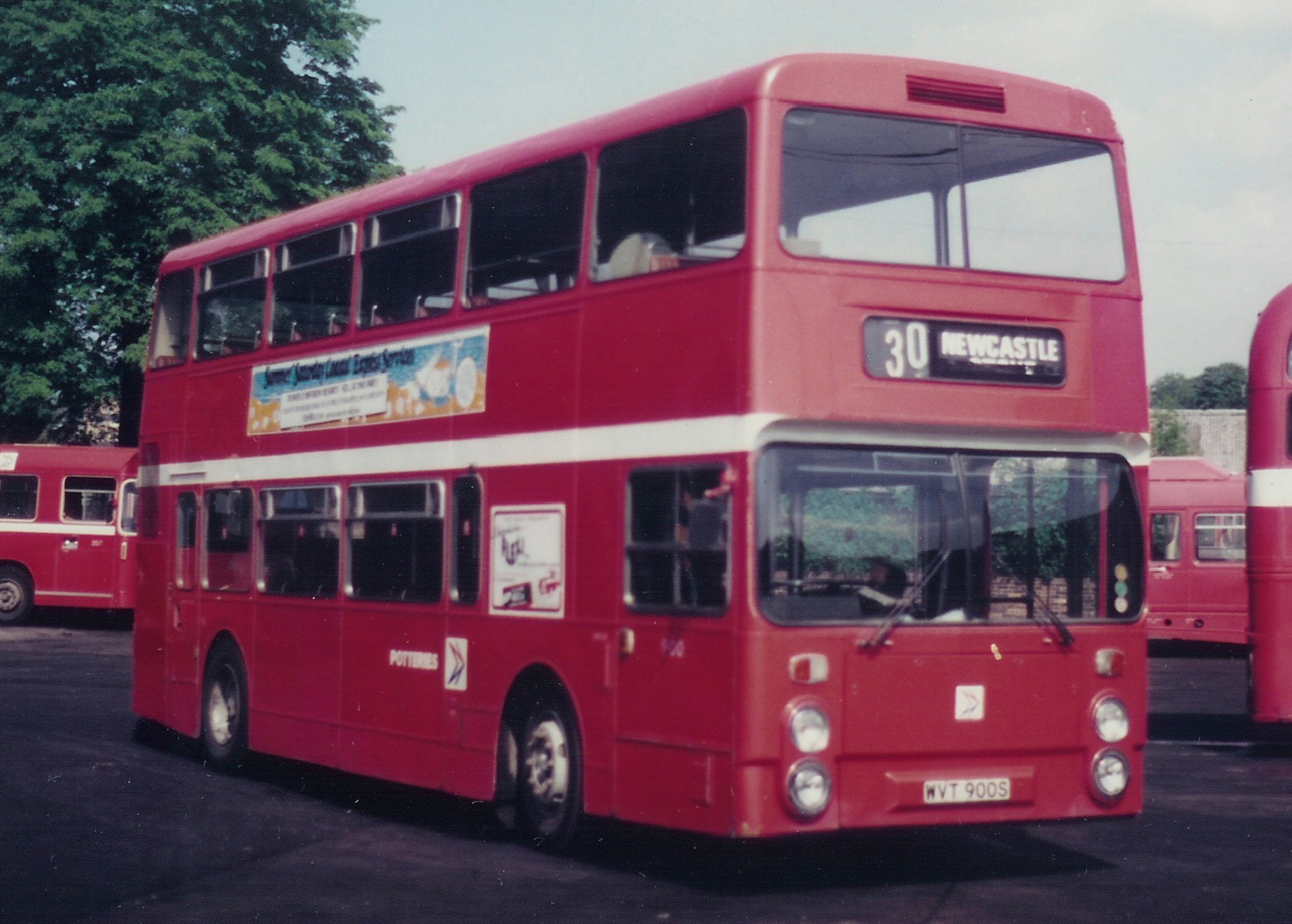
Potteries Motor Traction Northern Counties bodied Foden NC

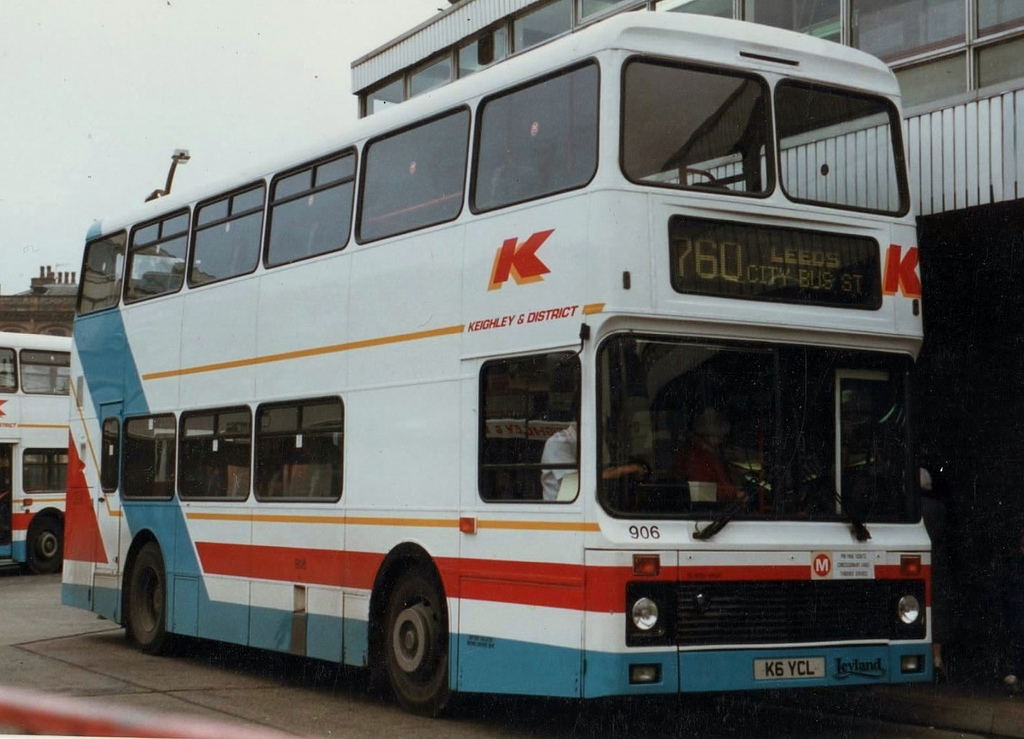
Keighley & District Northern Counties Palatine bodied Leyland Olympian

The Local Government Act 1972 came into effect on 1 April 1974. This reorganisation added Wigan Corporation Transport to SELNEC to create the Greater Manchester Passenger Transport Executive that was the largest bus operator outside London until privatisation in the late 1980s. A large proportion of Northern Counties production after this time was for the Greater Manchester fleet.

In 1975 the company collaborated with Foden, a well-known manufacturer of commercial vehicles, to produce a semi-integral double-deck vehicle named the Foden NC, intended to compete with chassis manufacturer Leyland. Leyland had merged with traditional rival Daimler and was experiencing production and quality problems. In the event, only seven Foden NCs were produced, going to the passenger transport executives of Greater Manchester, the West Midlands and West Yorkshire, Derby City Transport and National Bus Company subsidiary Potteries Motor Traction.

In June 1983, the Greater Manchester Passenger Transport Executive (GMPTE), a major customer of 'GM Standard' bodies for a double-decker fleet mainly consisting of Daimler Fleetlines and Leyland Atlanteans, purchased a 49% shareholding in Northern Counties.

=== Administration and management buyout ===
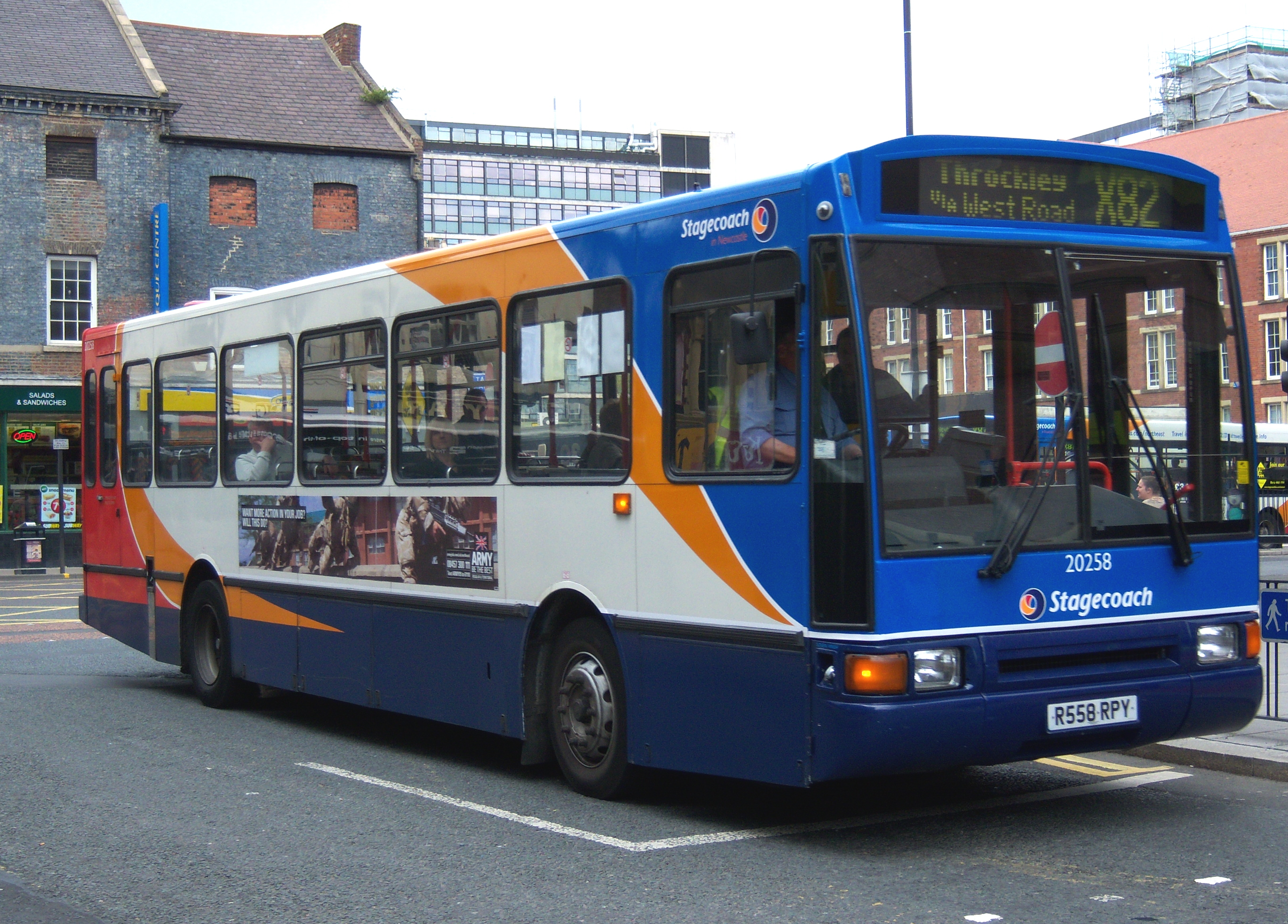
Stagecoach in Newcastle Paladin bodied Volvo B10M in May 2009

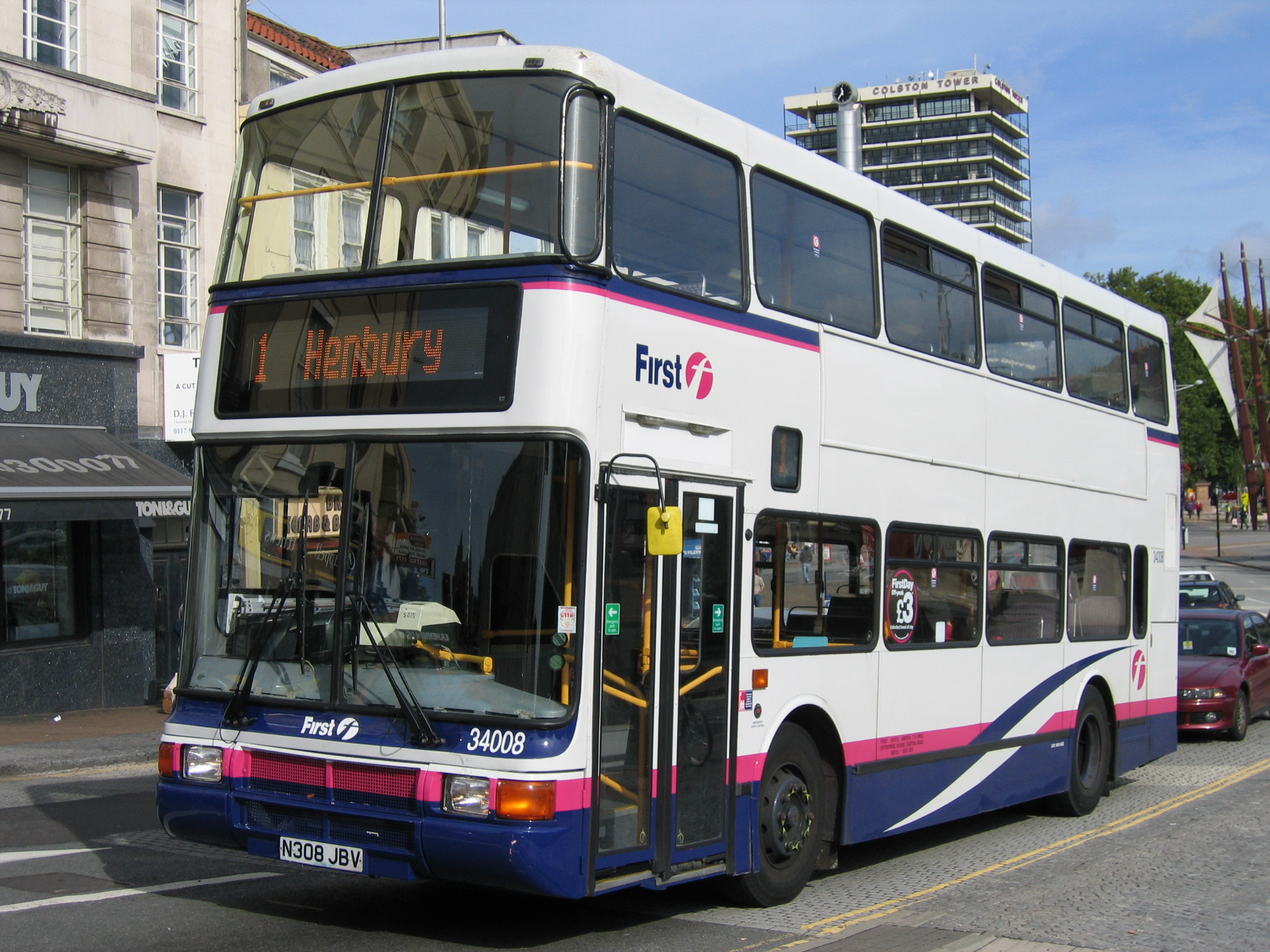
First Bristol Palatine II bodied Volvo Olympian in Bristol in September 2005

In May 1991, amid a severe downturn in bus and coach sales due to the early 1990s recession, a lack of customer confidence due to the after-effects of bus deregulation and the company exceeding its £500,000 overdraft, Northern Counties was placed into administration by GMPTE. Half of the 304 staff at the Northern Counties plant were made redundant within a week of administrators Grant Thornton being appointed, and it was estimated that the company would remain in business fulfilling existing orders until the following August. Following an advertisement being placed in the Financial Times newspaper, 50 bidders registered their interest in purchasing Northern Counties, and by September, with new orders still being placed for bodies by customers, the expected cessation of the company had been pushed back to March 1992 after the administrators had cut costs and reassured the company's 300 creditors.

By January 1992, Northern Counties had a full order book that included orders from London Regional Transport subsidiaries, had agreed outside contracts to respray vehicles owned by British Telecom, Post Office Limited and Lynx Express, and had launched the Countybus single-deck bus body (later renamed 'Paladin') at the Coach & Bus '91 expo, held at the National Exhibition Centre in Birmingham, with the company's largest ever show stand. After over a year in administration and with up to 100 employees previously laid off having been rehired, Northern Counties was sold by Grant Thornton in August 1992 to a management buyout worth £1.9 million (equivalent to £4,192,000 in 2025). Shortly after the buyout, Northern Counties revealed its restyled Palatine double-decker bus bodywork, known as the 'Palatine II'.

=== Demise ===
In May 1995, Northern Counties was purchased for £10 million (equivalent to £20,559,000 in 2025) by the Henlys Group, the parent company of Scarborough-based coach bodybuilder Plaxton. Following the purchase, Northern Counties launched the Paladin LF low-floor single-deck bus body at the Coach & Bus '95 expo, however production was moved to Plaxton's Scarborough factory in 1997 and the bus rebadged to the Plaxton Prestige. The Northern Counties name was dropped in 1999, however the company's factory was still maintained by Plaxton as a base for manufacturing the low-floor Plaxton President, itself a direct successor to Northern Counties' Palatine.

In 2000, Henlys entered a joint venture with the Mayflower Corporation, owner of bodybuilder Alexander and chassis manufacturer Dennis Specialist Vehicles, resulting in the formation of TransBus International. On 31 March 2004, however, TransBus International was placed into administration, resulting in administrators Deloitte making 72 workers at the Wigan plant redundant. Though TransBus International was successfully purchased by a consortium of buyers and restructured into Alexander Dennis, initially saving 200 jobs at the Wigan factory, on 26 January 2005, the former Northern Counties plant was closed by Alexander Dennis after completing outstanding orders of Plaxton President bodies for London bus operator Metroline.

== Products ==
=== Bus and coach bodies ===
Northern Counties mainly specialised on double-decker bus bodywork, although it began to diversify into single-deck bus bodies as well as minibus bodies on van-derived chassis, all named 'Countybus', following bus deregulation in Great Britain. From 1992, Northern Counties renamed their bodies:

- Palatine on various double-deck chassis (originally named Countybus/Countydec)
- Paladin on various single-deck chassis (originally also named Countybus)
- Pageant on van-derived minibus chassis
- Paladin LF on low-floor single-deck chassis (renamed Plaxton Prestige)

== See also ==
- Reeve Burgess, former bus body manufacturer also bought by Plaxton which ceased trading in 1991
