= Leyland Atlantean =

Rear engined double decker bus

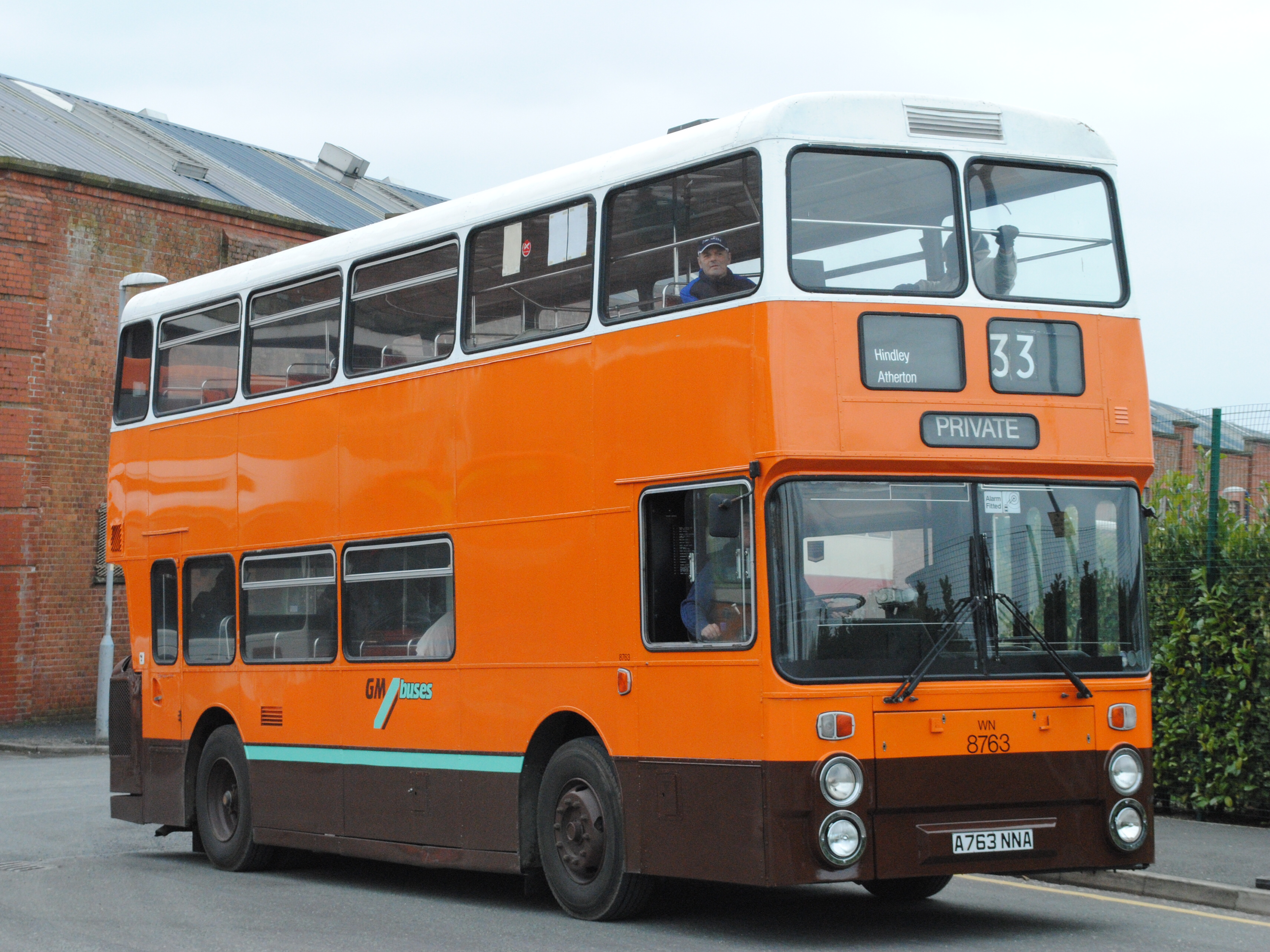
- A Northern Counties-bodied Atlantean seen at the Manchester Museum of Transport

Overview
- Manufacturer: Leyland
- Production: 1958–1986

Body and chassis
- Doors: 1-2
- Floor type: Step entrance

Powertrain
- Engine: Leyland O.600; Leyland O.680; Leyland O.690

Dimensions
- Length: 9.14–10.2 m (30 ft 0 in – 33 ft 6 in)
- Height: 4.1 m (13 ft 5 in)

Chronology
- Successor: Leyland Olympian

The Leyland Atlantean is a predominantly double-decker bus chassis manufactured by Leyland Motors between 1958 and 1986. Only 17 Atlantean chassis were bodied as single deck from new.

It pioneered the design of rear-engined, front entrance double deck buses in the United Kingdom, allowing for the introduction of one man operation buses, dispensing with the need for a bus conductor.

== The prototypes ==
In the years immediately following World War II, bus operators in the United Kingdom faced a downturn in the numbers of passengers carried and manufacturers began looking at ways to economise. A few experimental rear-engined buses had been produced before the war but none successfully made it beyond the prototype stage. The need to minimise the intrusion of the engine into passenger carrying space was a priority, leading to several underfloor-engined single-deck designs. However, such designs raised the height of the floor of the vehicle, forcing additional steps at the entrance. On double decker buses, these problems were amplified, causing either an increase in the overall height of the vehicle or an inadequate interior height.

In 1952, Leyland began experimenting with ideas for a rear-engined double-decker bus. A prototype was built, STF 90, with a body by Saunders-Roe, to the maximum permitted width of 7 feet 6 inches (2.29 m). It was fitted with a turbocharged version of the Leyland O.350 engine, which was transversely mounted at the rear of the sub-frame. The chassis was a platform-type frame of steel and light alloy with deep stressed side-members. An automatic clutch and self change gearbox were also fitted. The vehicle was designated the PDR1 (R for "Rear-engined").

In 1956, a second prototype was constructed, XTC 684, this time with a Metro-Cammell body and, again equipped with an O.350 engine fitted across the frame. It had a centrifugal clutch, Pneumocyclic gearbox and angle drive. This vehicle was 13 feet 2.75 inches (4.0323 m) in height, with a 16-foot-2.875-inch (4.94983 m) wheelbase and overall length of 29 feet 10 inches (9.09 m) and had a seating capacity of 78. Leyland christened this prototype the Lowloader.

Though two prototypes were thoroughly tested, the same problem of a front-engined bus remained, they had rear entrances with the space alongside the driver being wasted.

== PDR1/PDR2 ==
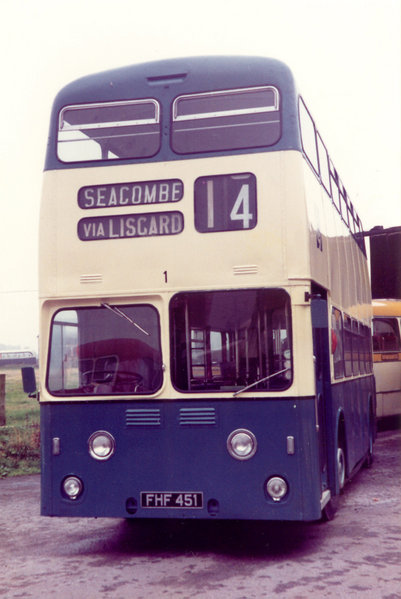
The first production Atlantean of Wallasey Corporation

An amendment to the Construction and Use Regulations in 1956 saw the maximum length for double-deckers increased to 30 feet (9.1 m), allowing a wider entrance to be located ahead of the front axle. This was initially to allow the driver to supervise boarding whilst the conductor collected fares, but quickly it became apparent that the design would allow for one man operation. Leyland took advantage of the new regulation to launch the first prototype Atlantean at the 1956 Commercial Motor Show at Earls Court Exhibition Centre. Though it featured the front entrance design that would redefine the bus industry, several factors prevented the bus going on the market. The main problem was the high level of engine noise inside the lower saloon, as the engine was still inside the body, with the compartment being used for bench seating.

Mechanically, the prototype Atlantean was similar to the Lowloader with an O.600 engine transversely mounted at the rear with a pneumo-cyclic gearbox situated in the rear offside corner providing drive in a straight line from the engine. The Atlantean had a light and strong fabricated frame. Light alloy floor plates were rivetted directly to the framework, fulfilling the dual purpose of reinforcing the frame and providing a foundation for the saloon floor. The platform-type sub-frame concept from the Lowloader was retained for the prototype. A drop-centre rear axle allowed the flat floor, only one step up from ground level, to continue for the full length of the bus.

The prototype was demonstrated around the country to various operators. It also had an unregistered sister vehicle, which was used as a testbed. Both were subsequently scrapped.

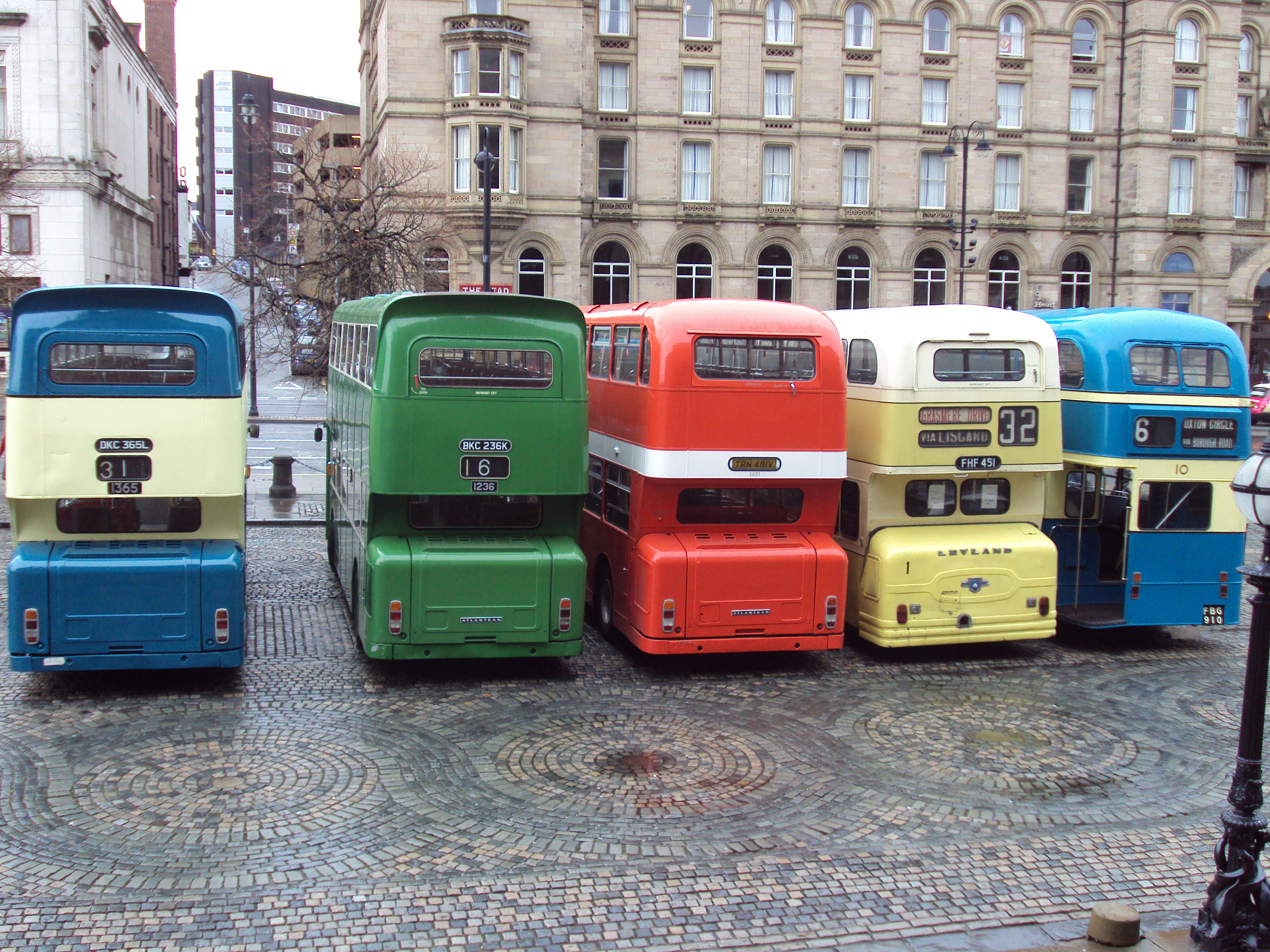
A distinctive feature (shared with the Daimler Fleetline) was the recess in the rear of the bodywork, required by the lift-up engine cover

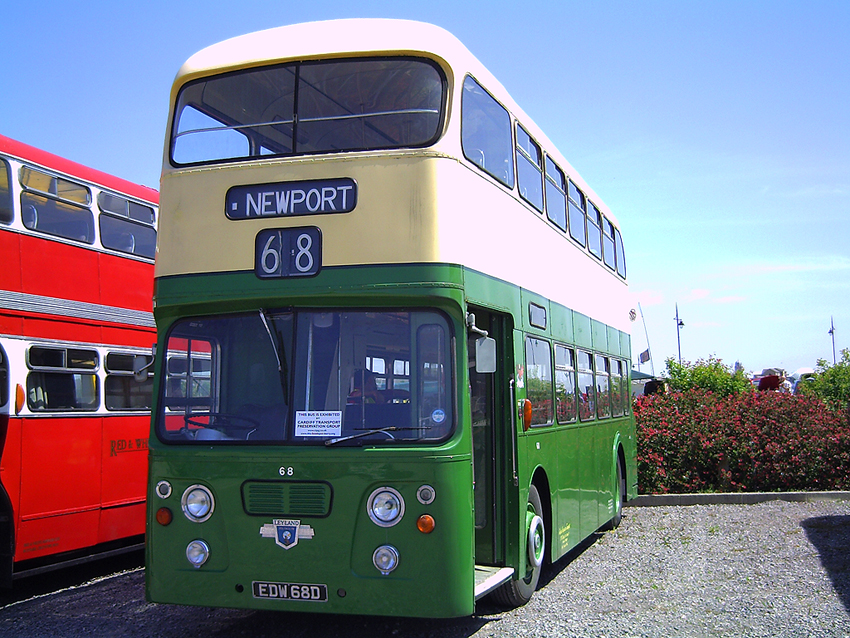
Preserved Newport Transport Alexander bodied Atlantean in 2004

By 1958, Leyland had overcome most of the problems and moved the engine to a rear-mounted compartment outside the main body and the first production Atlantean PDR1/1, with a 16-foot-3-inch (4.95 m) wheelbase, was launched at the 1958 Commercial Motor Show. It had simpler mechanical specification than the prototype, with conventional front and rear axles, leaf springs all round and a channel section frame. Glasgow Corporation, James of Ammanford and Wallasey Corporation each put their first example of the type into service in December 1958.

From 1964, a drop-centre rear axle was available as an option for the Atlantean; the Atlanteans with drop-centre rear axles became known as the Atlantean PDR1/2 and, for the later version, the Atlantean PDR1/3. In 1967, Leyland launched the Atlantean PDR2/1 which could be fitted with 33-foot-long bodywork (10 m).

In 1965, London Transport purchased a fleet of 50, initially operating on routes 7, 24, 67 and 271 before being transferred to Croydon.

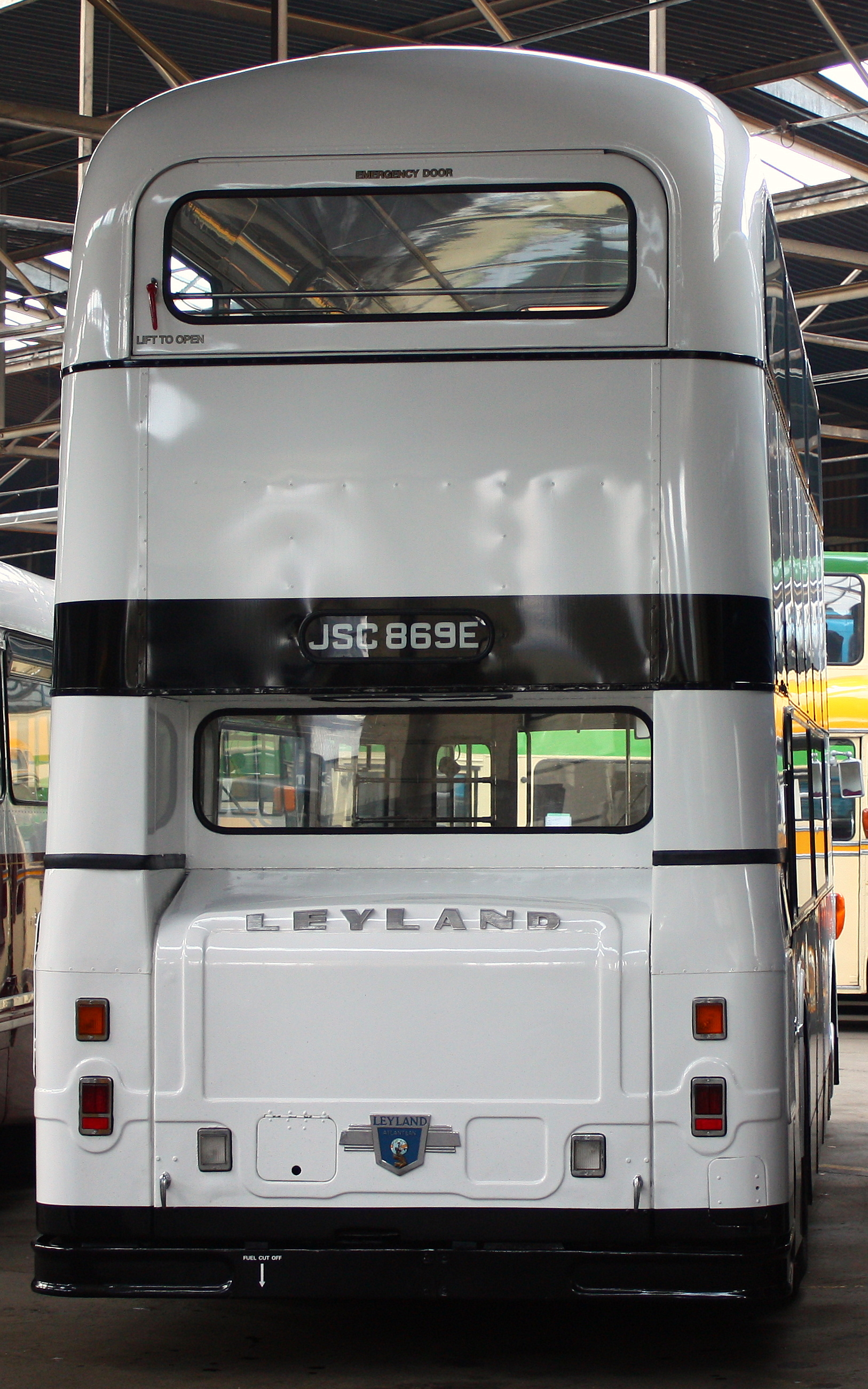
In some body designs the recess was not full-width

Though some operators initially continued to buy front-engined vehicles for reliability, the Atlantean gained multiple orders. Though the National Bus Company and the Scottish Bus Group favoured the Bristol VR and Daimler Fleetline respectively, the Atlantean was bought by many municipal operators. Aberdeen, Bournemouth, Glasgow, Edinburgh, Newcastle, Manchester, Liverpool, Newport, Nottingham and Plymouth Corporations purchased large numbers of the type.

In 1968, three Atlanteans were bodied by Marshall as single deck buses for Great Yarmouth Corporation. Portsmouth had 12 Atlantean chassis with single deck bodywork from Seddon Pennine, and lastly Birkenhead ordered three Northern Counties bodied single deck Atlanteans, albeit delivered to Merseyside in Birkenhead colours.

By 1972, over 6,000 Atlanteans had entered service.

== AN68/AN69 ==
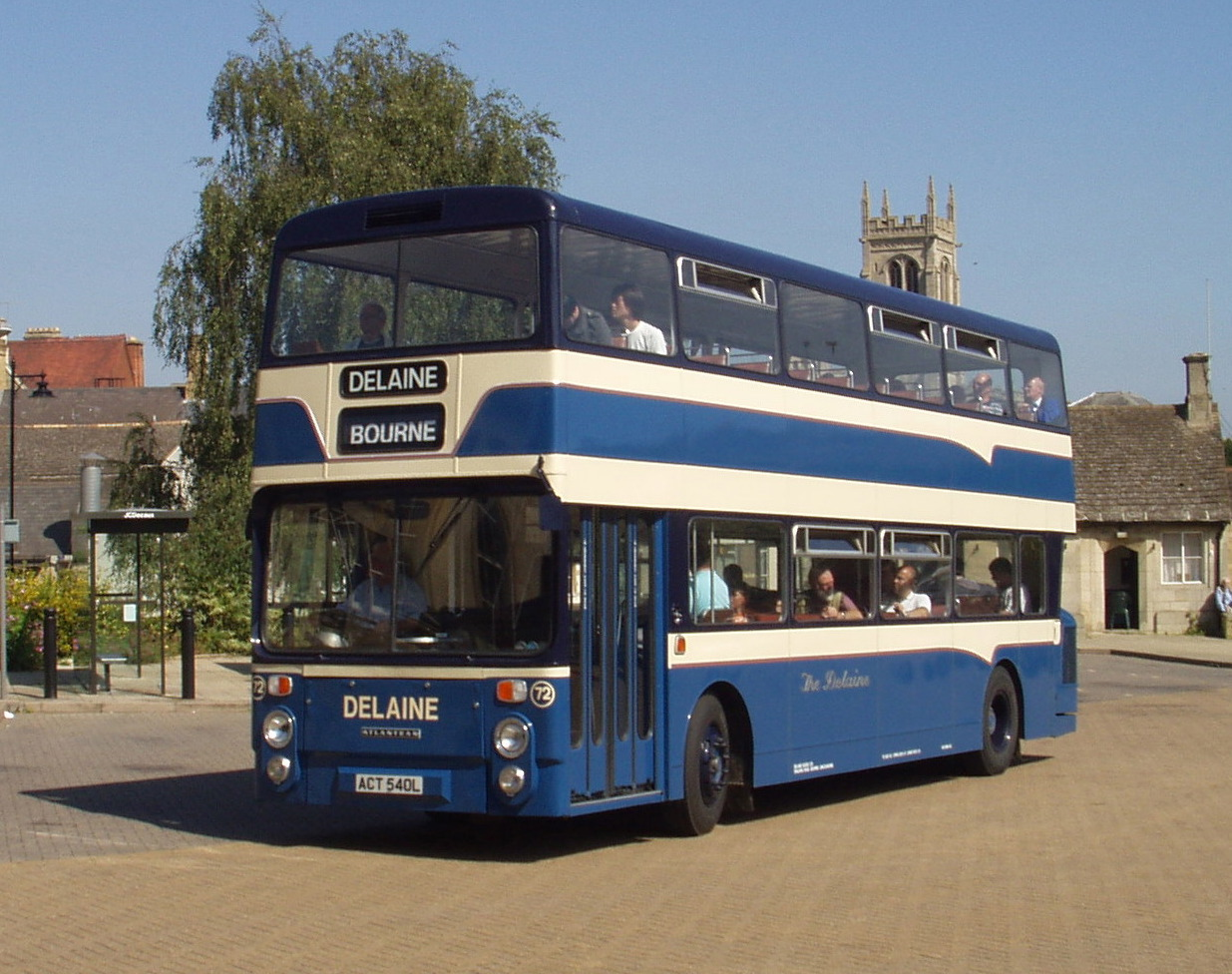
Preserved Delaine Buses Northern Counties bodied Atlantean in Stamford in August 2007

In February 1972, Leyland announced the AN68 series to replace the PDR1/PDR2. The new chassis provided a wider entrance and several new safety features were included. An audible and visible alarm discouraged engine overheating by giving the driver due warning. A fail-safe parking brake was introduced, while the steering box and brake controls were protected against damage from severe head-on collision and stainless steel air-piping gave greater resistance to corrosion.

Two models were offered: AN68/1R (9.4m in length) and AN68/2R (10.2m in length). Power assisted steering was standard on the AN68/2R and optional on the AN68/1R. The steering pump was power driven, which replaced the early belt driven system, while the only available engine was the Leyland O.680. A wide variety of body styles from various manufacturers continued to be offered, allowing the Atlantean to be tailor-made to requirements from operators ranging from the small independent to the large city corporation.

In 1978, Leyland started to offer the AN69 with Leyland O.690 (a turbocharged variant of the O.680 engine), all were sold to overseas operators. However one AN69 with the 0.690 engine ended up with now defunct operator J. Fishwick & Sons of Leyland, the vehicle having been intended for export to Baghdad.

The Atlantean continued to sell in large numbers, with many operators proving loyal to it. London Transport however, chose the Daimler Fleetline over the AN68 for its first large rear-engined double-deck order. Though over 2,000 Fleetlines would be purchased, reliability problems led to their very premature withdrawal.

The formation of British Leyland in 1968 saw rivals Daimler and Bristol merge with Leyland, bringing the two competing rear-engined chassis (Daimler Fleetline and Bristol VR) together with the Atlantean. Though the Bristol brand was retained, Daimler was dropped and products were re-badged as Leylands. After the re-organisation, Leyland set out to develop a new rear-engined double-deck bus for the London market to replace the troublesome Fleetlines. This new vehicle, the Titan B15 spawned a simpler, non-integral offshoot, the Olympian, which debuted in 1980. Though the Olympian was meant as a direct replacement for the VR, Fleetline and Atlantean, the venerable AN68 continued in production alongside the Olympian until 1986. The last Atlantean for the domestic market rolled off the production line in 1984, the last of a batch for Merseyside PTE, while the export version remained in production for a further two years, with deliveries to the city operator in Baghdad, Iraq.

By the end of production, over 15,000 Atlanteans had been built. Greater Manchester PTE (and its predecessors) was the largest operator of the Atlantean with 'Greater Manchester Standard' bodies from Northern Counties and, to a lesser extent, Park Royal. Second was Glasgow Corporation/Greater Glasgow PTE all of which were bodied by Walter Alexander. Third was Merseyside PTE who took approximately 800 Atlanteans mostly bodied by Walter Alexander and East Lancs although there were smaller batches with MCW and Willowbrook bodies.

== Exports ==
=== Singapore ===
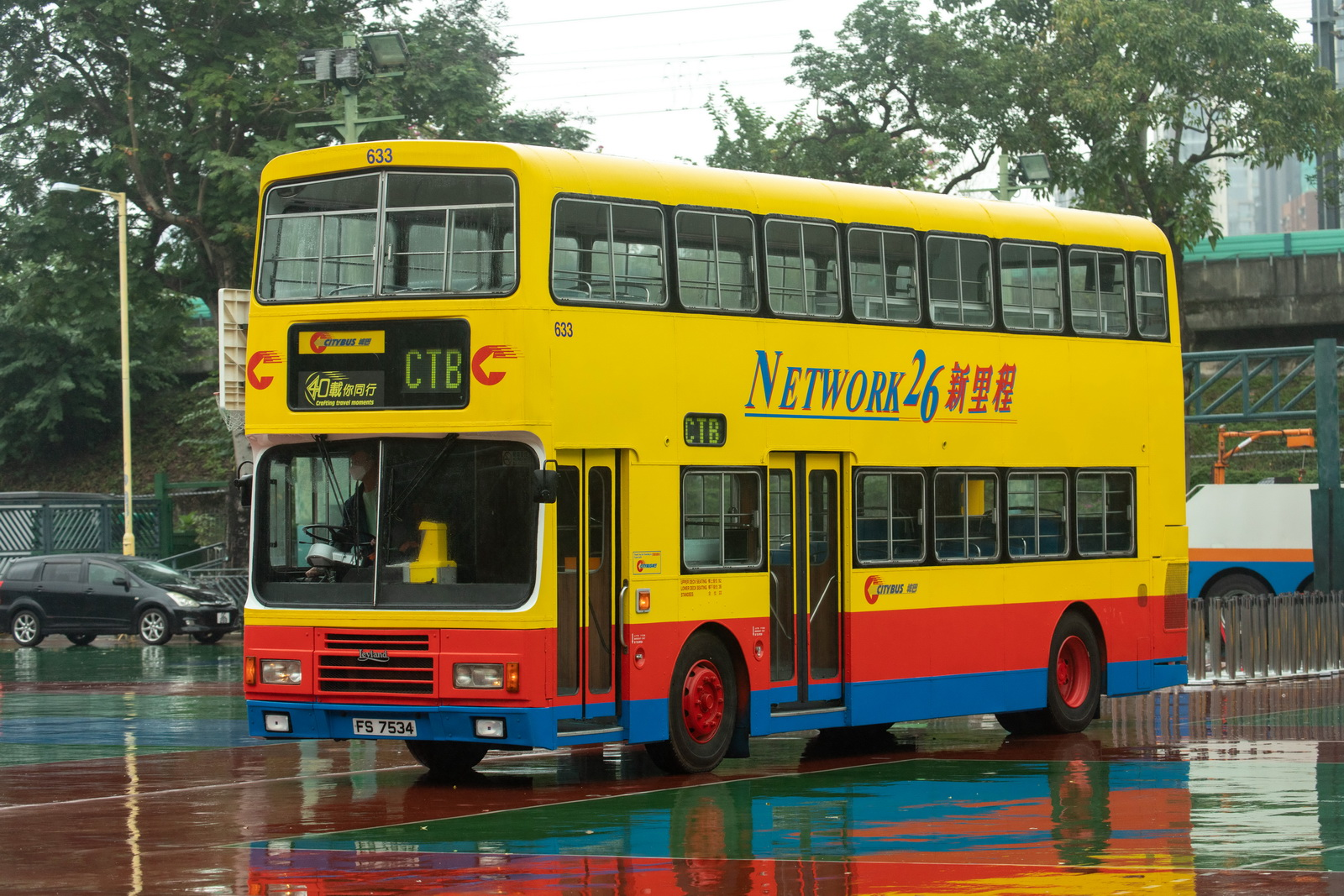
Preserved ex-SBS Transit Citybus Leyland Atlantean on Network 26 in November 2022

In 1977, Singapore Bus Services (SBS) received 20 Leyland Atlantean AN68s with BACo and Metal Sections bodywork on a trial to test their suitability on Singapore roads. These were Singapore's first double deck buses after an AEC Regent was deployed in 1953. They were first deployed on route 86, which plied between Hougang South and Shenton Way and thereafter redeployed to other routes. These buses were withdrawn and sold to China in 1990.

Satisfied with the trial, SBS ordered 200 Leyland Atlanteans in 1978. Half of this intake were fitted with a Metal Sections body by Soon Chow and the other half an Alexander L body by SBS Woodlands Depot. They were deployed between 1979 and 1980 and all units were retired by 1993. All 100 of the Alexander-bodied buses were sold to Citybus of Hong Kong for use on Network 26 and 37 of the Metal Sections-bodied buses to Shanghai, China, where they would continue revenue service. The Citybus' buses would be refitted with a modified Alexander R front and served as the bulk of their training fleet. These buses were scrapped by the mid-1990s, with a handful sold to South Africa. although one of them (Citybus fleet number A633) was a rare survivor and underwent restoration works in mid-2019.

In 1982, SBS ordered another 100 units of Leyland Atlantean, all of which were imported from the UK completely built up with the Alexander L bodywork although there was a cancelled plan to fit one of them with an Eastern Coach Works body. Some of these buses were equipped with blind changing advertisement boards, dubbed as "Flexvision". These buses entered revenue service that same year and 1983 and all units were withdrawn by 1995.

The final 200 Leyland Atlanteans were ordered in 1983. Equipped with the Alexander R bodywork, these buses were registered between 1984 and 1986. These buses had a vast improvement in specifications as compared to their older brethren, such as push door control buttons, a new dashboard layout, air circulation systems for use in inclement weather and fully automatic transmissions. Withdrawals began in 1996 and the last of these units retired in late 2000.

=== United States ===
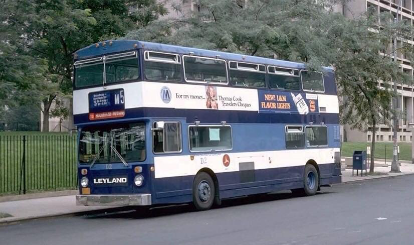
A Leyland Atlantean of the New York City Metropolitan Transportation Authority in 1976

A small fleet of eight Atlanteans also crossed the Atlantic, entering service in New York City after several delays. Negotiations to order the double-deckers began in 1971, but the first eight buses only arrived in August 1976, after several delays due to NHTSA not having approved them. MTA had assured Leyland that NHTSA would waive certain requirements, but this was not the case and the buses had to be returned to the factory from the docks in Liverpool at MTA's expense to be retrofitted with additional warning lights and emergency exits as well as changes to the transmission and air brakes. By this time, the Atlantean was nearing the end of production. After finally getting the NHTSA-certified buses from the docks, it was discovered that their height made them unsuitable for use on Fifth Avenue, and due to an underdimensioned air-conditioning system they could not be operated in the height of summer. They finally entered service in September 1977, but New York's heavily potholed roads took a toll and maintenance proved difficult; the Atlanteans spent most of their time being repaired before the fleet was quietly withdrawn in 1980.

=== Australia ===
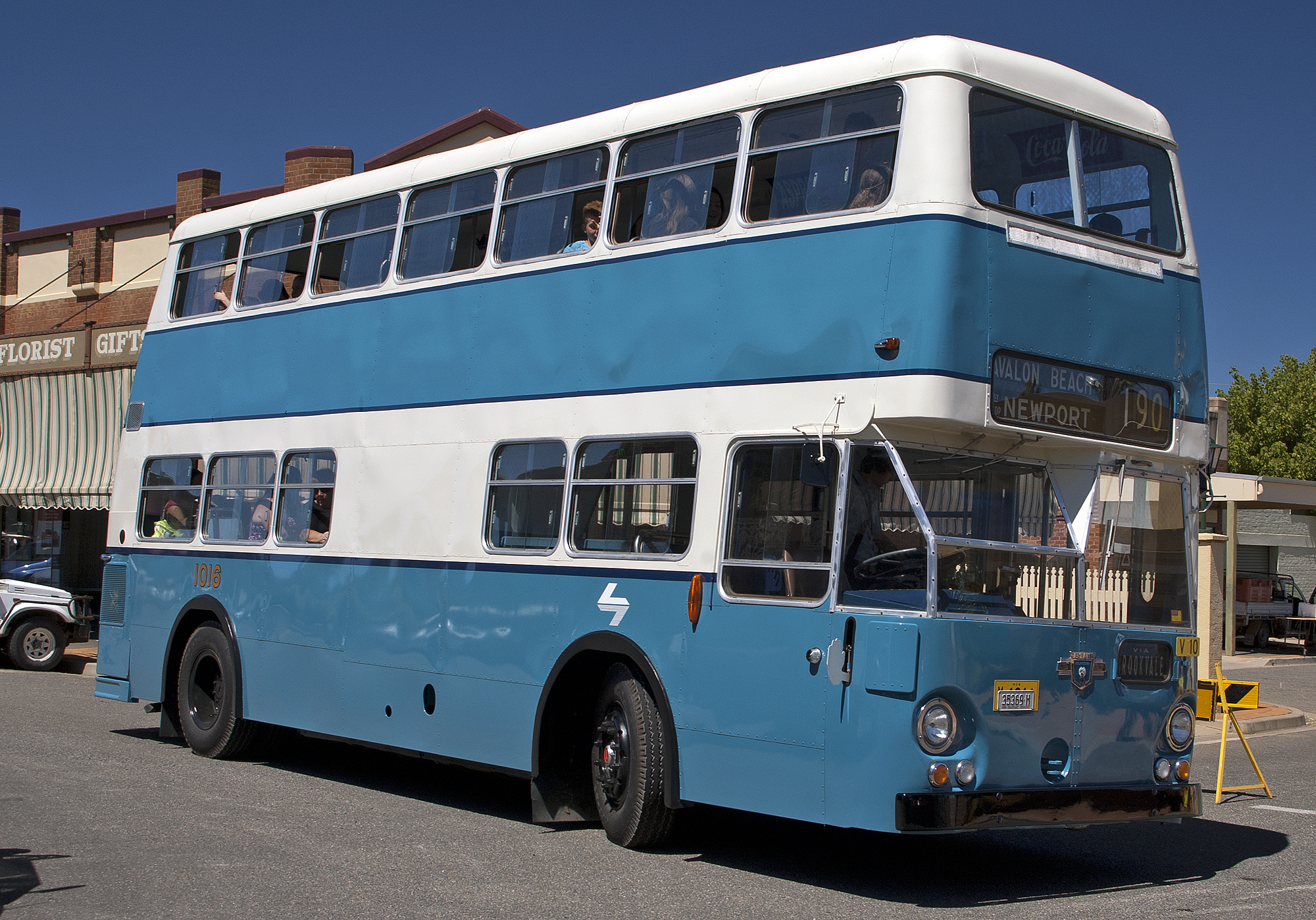
Public Transport Commission Pressed Metal Corporation bodied Atlantean in Junee in March 2011

In Australia, a fleet of 224 were bodied by Pressed Metal Corporation for the Public Transport Commission, Sydney between 1970 and 1973. Reliability and industrial relations issues plagued the fleet with withdrawals commencing in 1979. A deal was concluded to sell the fleet to China Motor Bus, however the incoming Government of New South Wales blocked the deal. The final examples were withdrawn in 1986, by which time they were concentrated on route 190 to Palm Beach. These were the first double deck buses bodied in Australia for 17 years, and would be the last until the Bustech CDi in 2011. Many would go on to have longer careers after being sold, and some still are in service today, often in open top configuration.

Many former municipal bus company Atlanteans were imported into Australia in the 1970s. Australian Pacific Tours, Kirkland Bros Omnibus Services of Lismore, Sita Buslines and Westbus of Sydney among the operators. In April 1974 a PDR1A/1 chassis originally intended for Southampton Corporation but fire damaged at East Lancashire Coachbuilders was bodied by Pressed Metal Corporation as a single deck bus for Seven Hills Bus Co.

=== Other countries ===
Atlanteans were also exported to Baghdad Passenger Transport Services (600), Córas Iompair Éireann (840), Jakarta (108), Kuwait, Manila (22), Portugal (130) and Storstockholms Lokaltrafik (50).

== Competitors ==
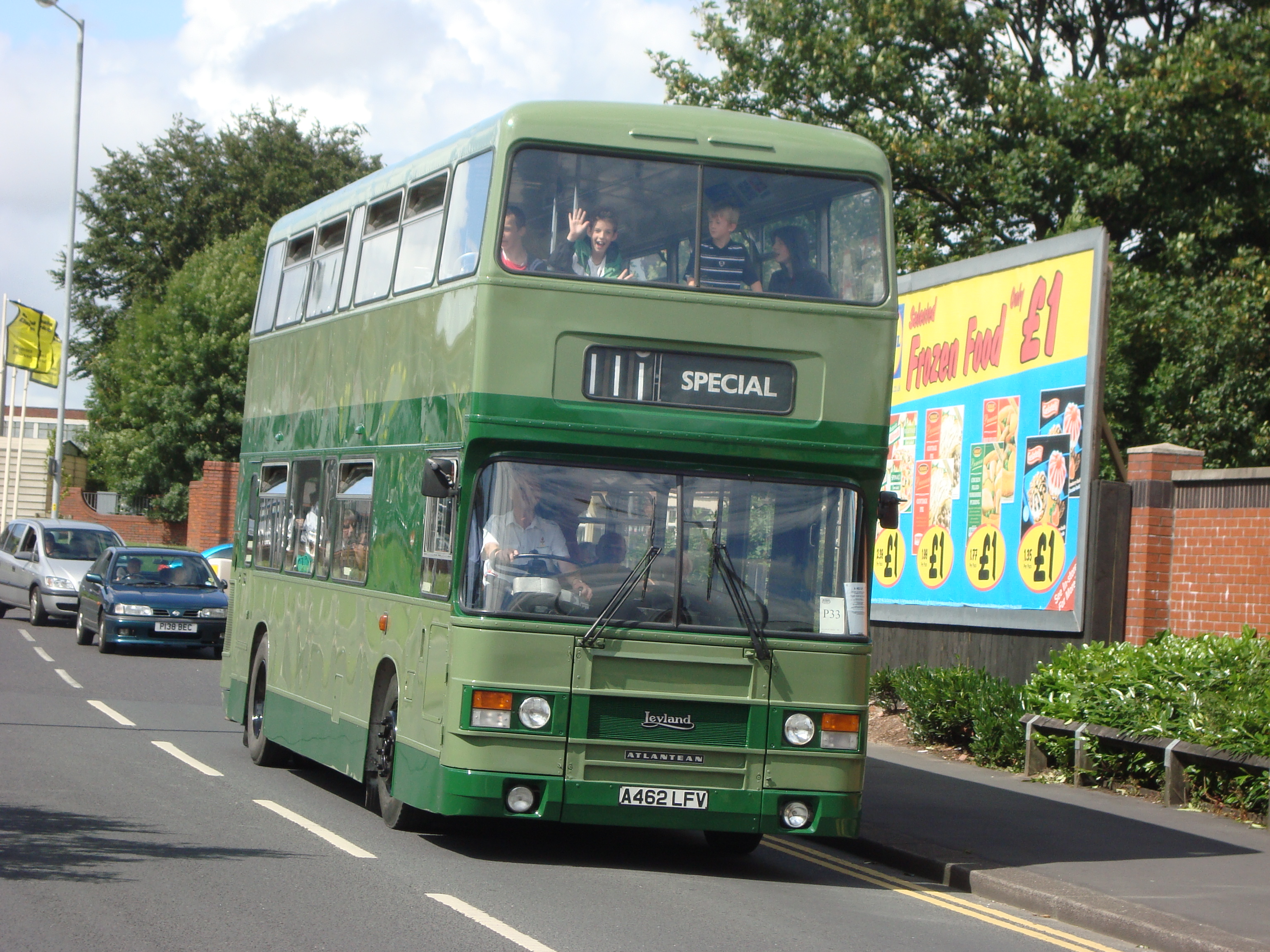
John Fishwick & Sons Eastern Coach Works bodied Atlantean AN69 in July 2009

Though the Atlantean was the first high-volume rear-engined double-decker on the market, Daimler was quick to catch up with its Fleetline model. Bristol followed several years later with its VRT.

The Bristol was favoured by the state-owned National Bus Company, several of whose predecessors had standardised on Bristol vehicles. Several early examples were also purchased by NBC's Scottish sister company, the Scottish Bus Group, where the front-engined Bristol Lodekka had proved popular. However, the Scottish customers did not share the same enthusiasm for the VR and the vehicles purchased were swapped for ex-NBC Lodekkas. The Scottish Bus Group then standardised on the Daimler Fleetline for its double-deck needs.

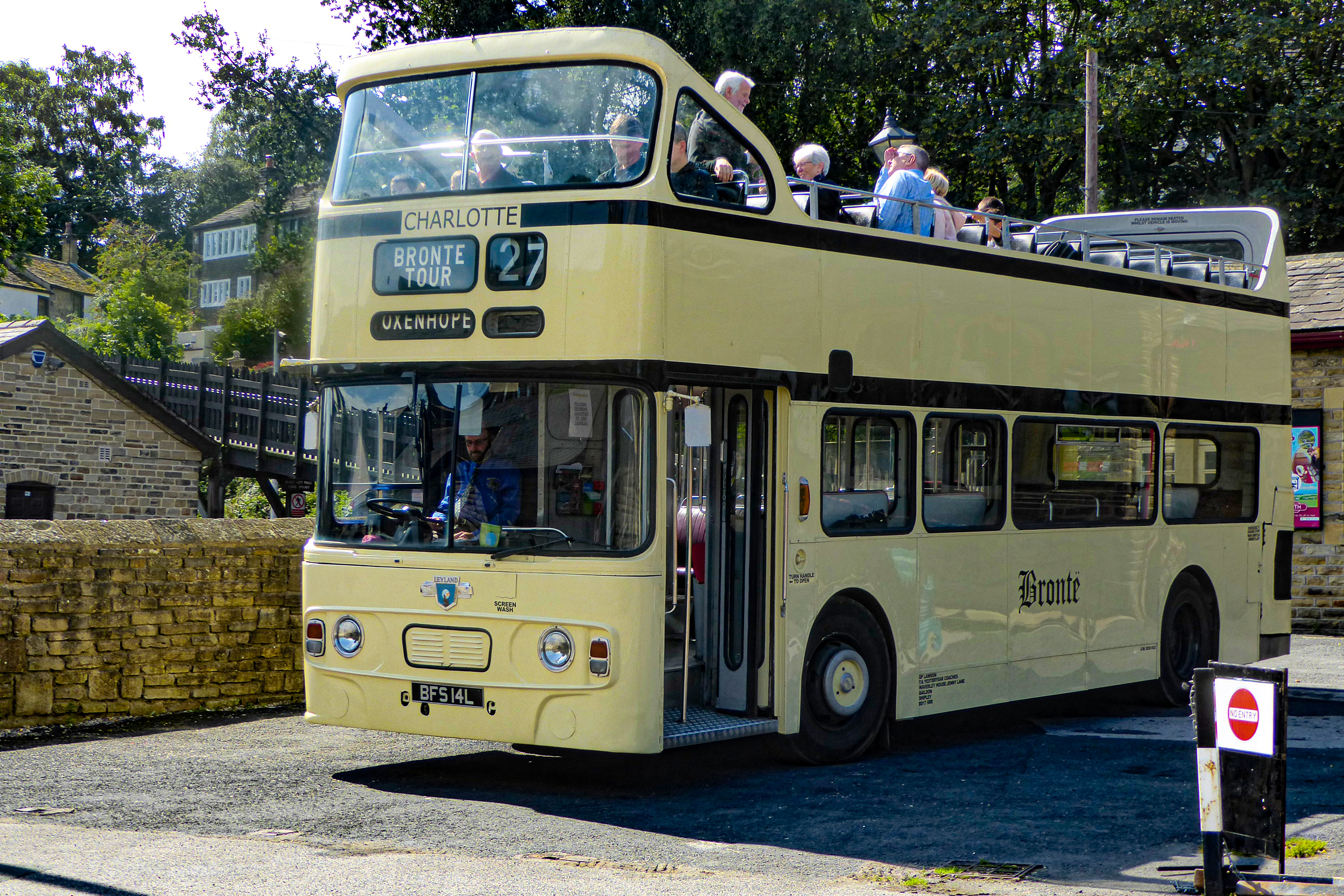
A Bristol VR Series 2 open-top bus on the Brontë Tour service, outside Haworth railway station

After the re-organisation of British Leyland, both VR and Fleetline became Leyland offerings and, when production of both ceased in 1981, over 6,400 VRs and 11,500 Fleetlines had been built. Frustrated at the lack of competition to Leyland, some operators turned to other manufacturers, who began to offer alternatives to the state-owned manufacturer. Supply problems at Leyland did not help matters and products such as the Scania Metropolitan and Dennis Dominator began to make small inroads into the rear-engined market, while the Volvo Ailsa B55 reintroduced a front-engined double-deck chassis, with a front entrance, with some success. The Scania/Metro Cammell Weymann partnership, which produced the Metropolitan, ended in the late 1970s and forced MCW to introduce its own rear-engined product, available as an integral or chassis, the MCW Metrobus. The success of the Metrobus, particularly with West Midlands Passenger Transport Executive and London Transport, would spur Leyland on to develop a new heavy-duty rear-engined bus, sealing the eventual withdrawal of the Atlantean from the market.
