= East Lancs Cityzen =

Double-decker bus body on Scania N113 chassis

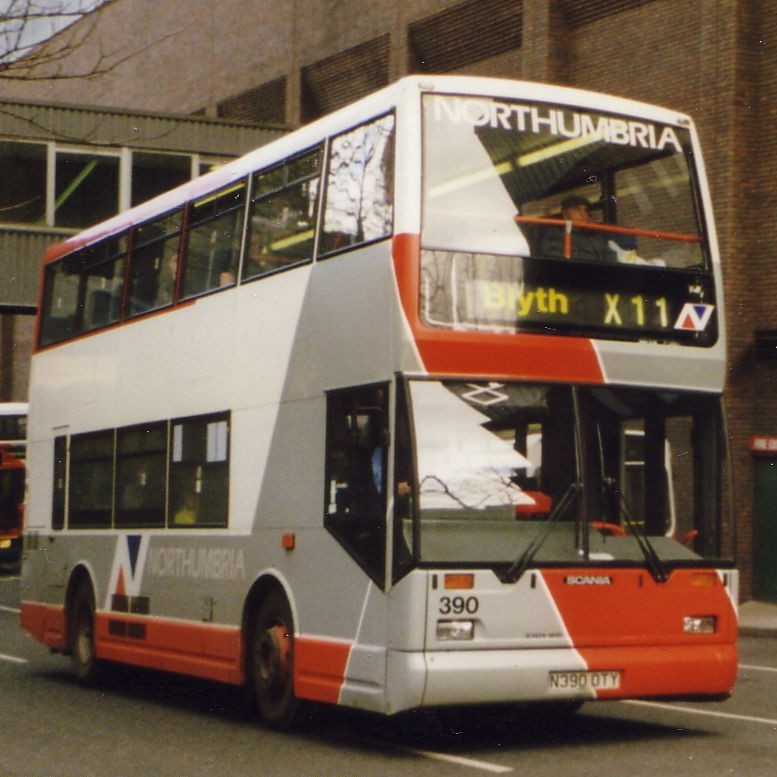
- A Northumbria Motor Services East Lancs Cityzen bodied Scania N113DRB in Eldon Square bus station

Overview
- Manufacturer: East Lancashire Coachbuilders
- Production: 1995–2000

Body and chassis
- Doors: 1 door
- Floor type: Step entrance
- Chassis: Scania N113DRB

Powertrain
- Engine: Scania

Dimensions
- Length: 10.2m or 10.8m
- Width: 2.5m
- Height: 4.2m

Chronology
- Successor: East Lancs OmniDekka

The East Lancs Cityzen is a double-decker bus body that was built on the Scania N113DRB chassis by East Lancashire Coachbuilders between 1995 and 2000. The name started East Lancs' tradition of using 'misspelt' product names.

== History ==
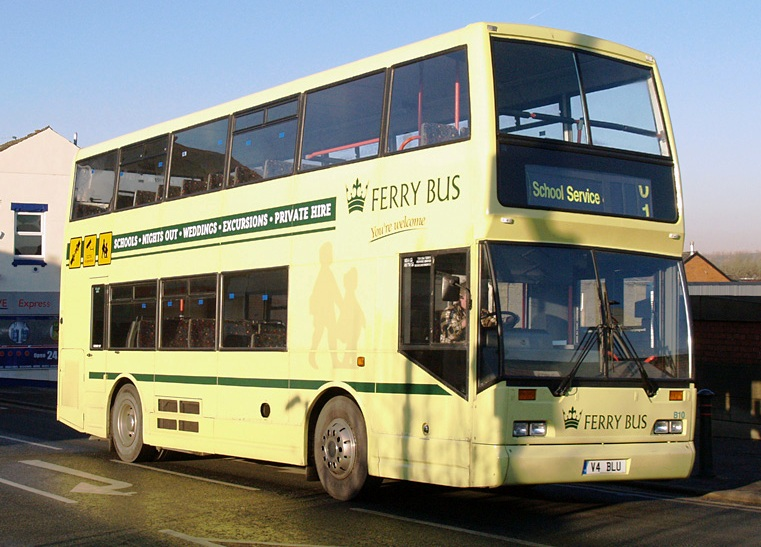
Courtesy Coaches Cityzen in former The Kings Ferry livery in Castleton, December 2007

The Cityzen was developed in partnership with Scania, and a total of 86 were built. Brighton & Hove was the biggest customer with 31, with the first ten being delivered in 1996 for services serving Sussex University, while Northumbria Motor Services took 13, and Mayne's of Manchester took eight.

The remaining 34 were sold to a large variety of small to medium-sized operators, among them Clayton Jones of Pontypridd, which took six, and Bullocks Coaches of Manchester, which had four.

From 1997, the Cityzen was complemented by the similar Pyoneer on the Volvo Olympian, B10M and the Dennis Arrow chassis.

The successor of the Cityzen was the OmniDekka, which was based on the low-floor Scania N94UD.

== See also ==
- List of buses
