= Scania N113 =

Swedish High-floor city Bus chassis made by Scania

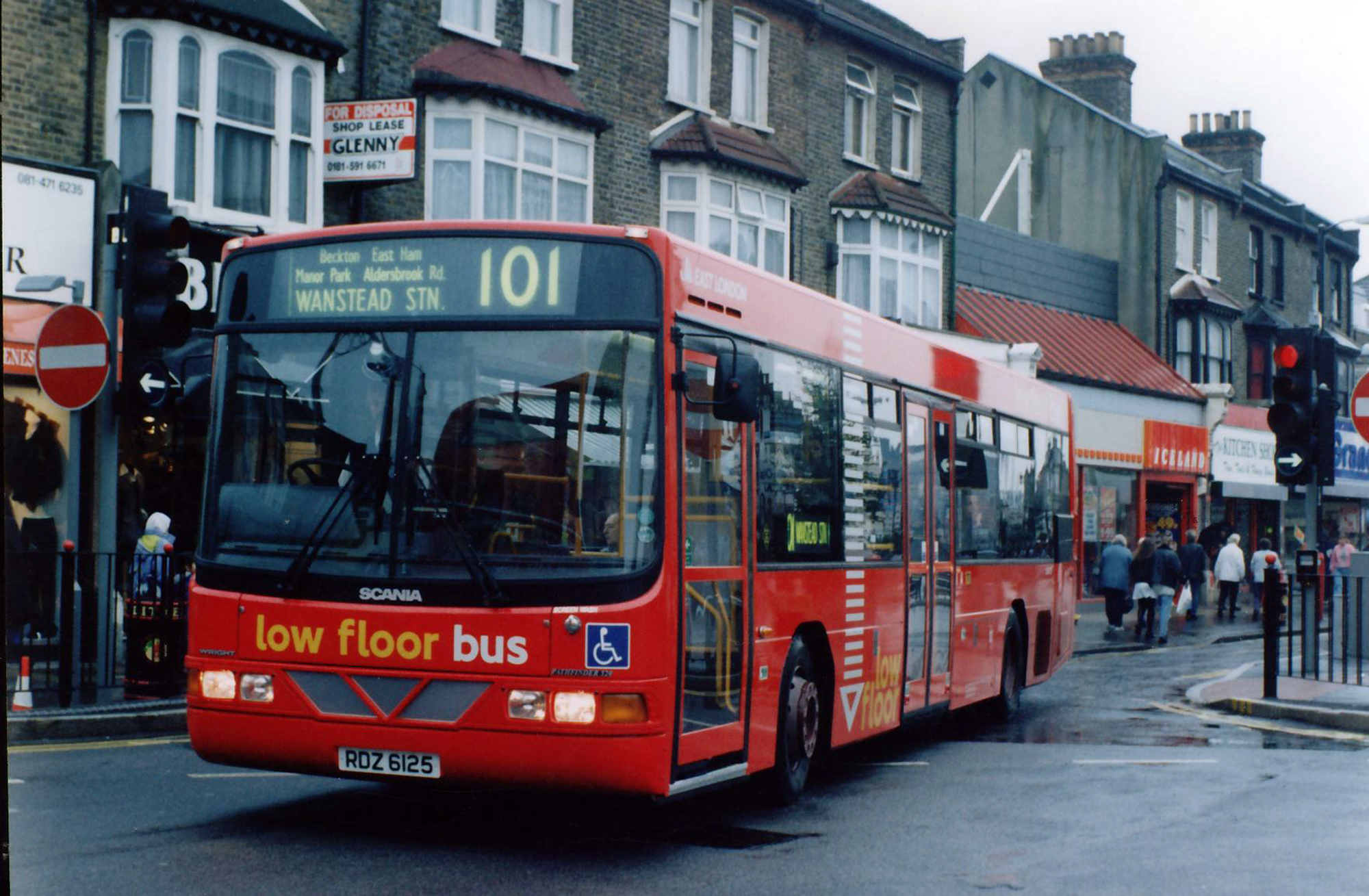
- London Transport Wright Pathfinder bodied Scania N113 on route 101 in October 1994

Overview
- Manufacturer: Scania
- Production: 1988–2000

Body and chassis
- Body style: Single-decker bus Single-decker articulated bus Double-decker bus
- Doors: 1, 2 or 3
- Floor type: Step entrance Low floor

Powertrain
- Engine: Scania DS11; Scania DSC11
- Capacity: 11 litres
- Transmission: Scania; Voith

Dimensions
- Length: 10.5, 11.3, 12.0 and 18.0 metres
- Width: 2.5m

Chronology
- Predecessor: Scania N112
- Successor: Scania N94; Scania K94UB

The Scania N113 was a transverse-engined step-entrance and low-floor city bus chassis manufactured by Scania between 1988 and 2000.

== History ==
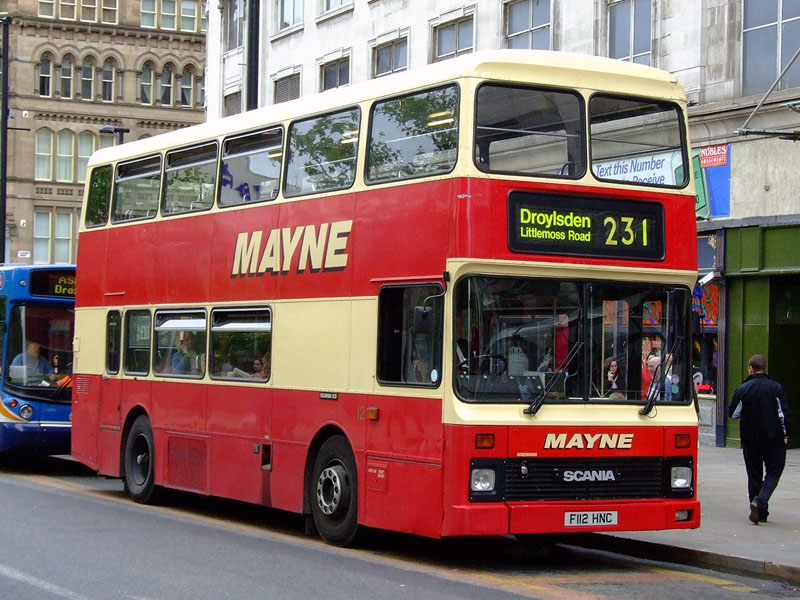
Mayne Coaches Northern Counties bodied Scania N113DRB in Manchester in June 2006

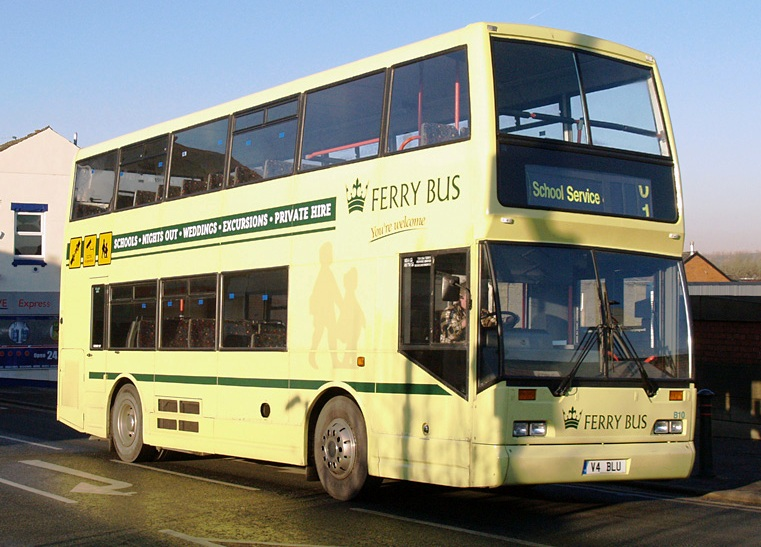
The Kings Ferry East Lancs Cityzen bodied Scania N113DRB in December 2007

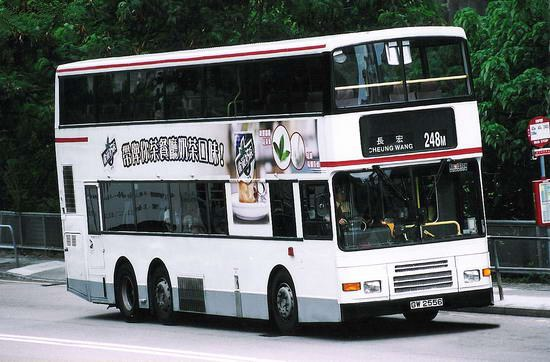
Kowloon Motor Bus 3-axle Scania N113 in November 2005

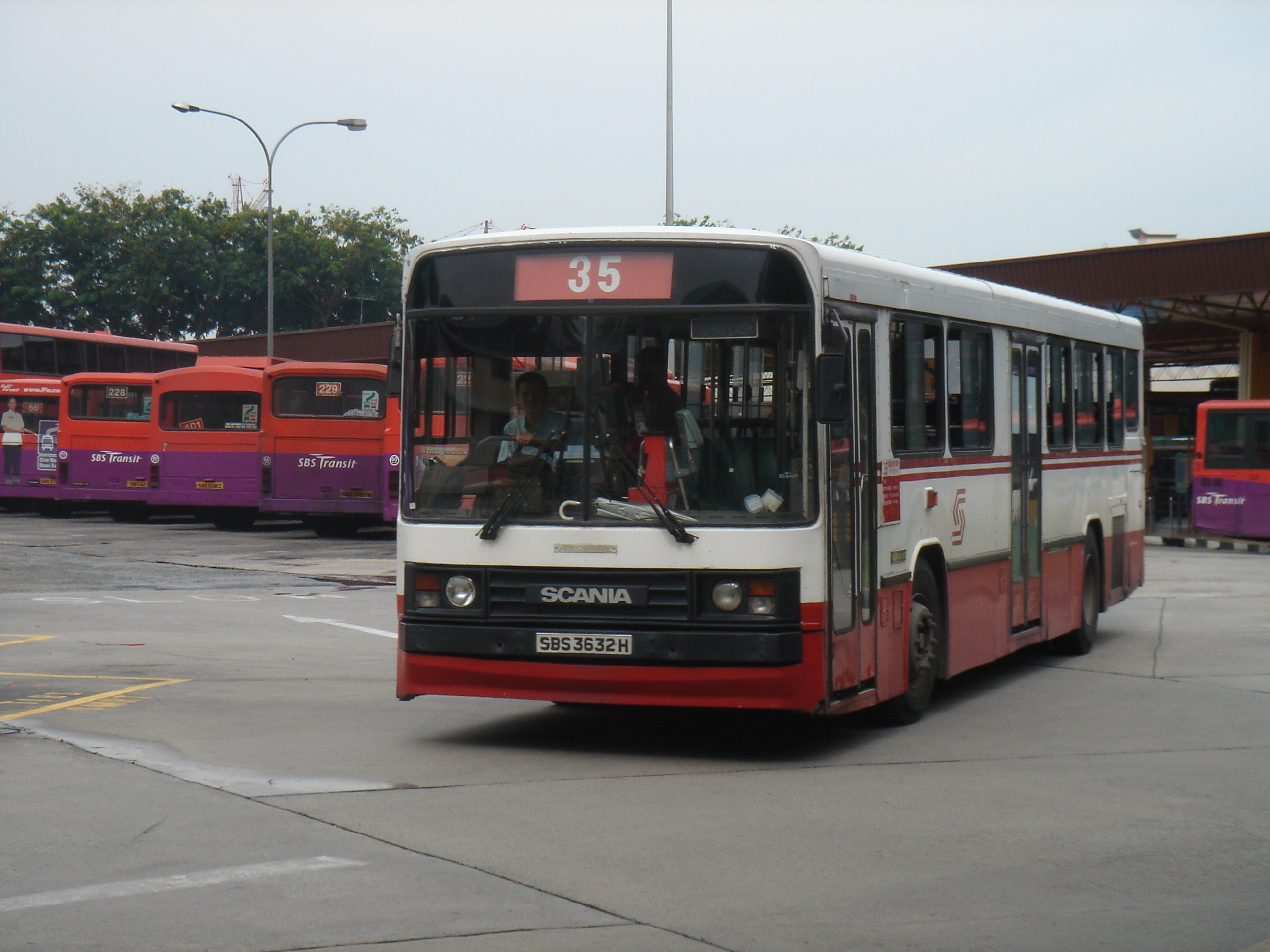
SBS Transit Alexander PS bodied Scania N113CRB at Bedok Bus Interchange

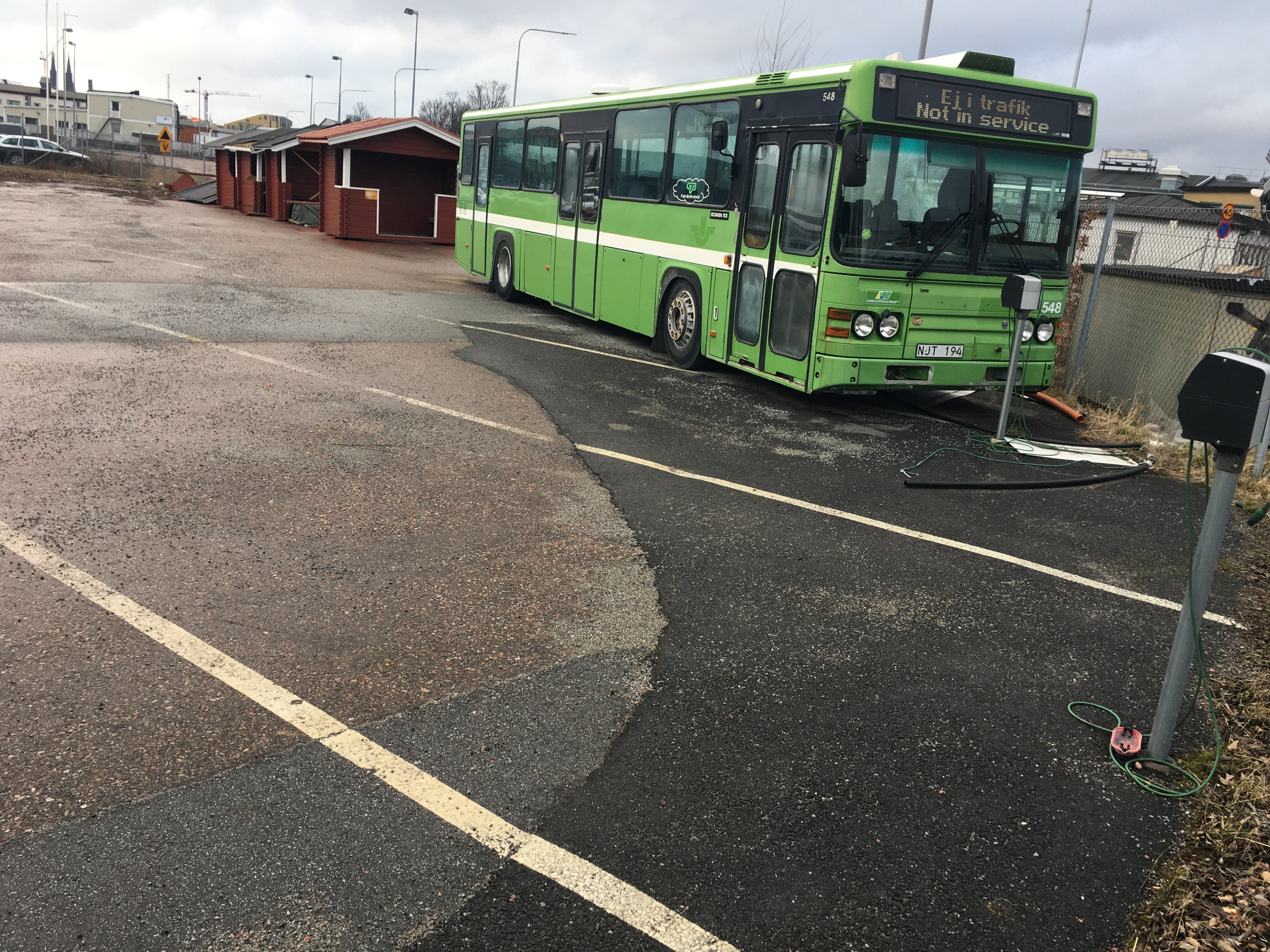
Scania N113 with Scania bodywork (Scania CN113) in Uppsala, Sweden

The Scania N113 was designed as a successor to the N112. Most of the single-decker buses and the double-decker buses have a double-curvature windscreen with an arched top. It had an 11-litre engine mounted at the rear, coupled to either a Scania or Voith gearbox. It was available as:

- a standard-floor single-decker bus (N113CLB/N113CRB)
- a low-floor single-decker bus (N113CLB-LG/N113CLL/N113CRL)
- a double-decker bus with two or three axles (N113DRB/3-axle N113)
- an articulated bus (N113ALB).

== United Kingdom ==
A total of 641 N113s were sold in the United Kingdom, this figure made up of 405 two-axle double-deckers, 194 standard-floor single-deckers and 42 low-floor single-deckers.

The double-deckers were offered with bodywork by Alexander, East Lancs and Northern Counties, while most of the standard-floor single-deckers were bodied by Alexander to their PS and Strider designs, though the Wright Endurance, Plaxton Verde and East Lancs EL2000 were also specified.

London Transport was to be the biggest UK customer for the double-deckers, taking 71 between 1989 and 1992 for its London Northern and East London subsidiaries. Of these, 29 were bodied by Alexander, the other 42 by Northern Counties. Brighton & Hove bought 51 between 1989 and 1998, all with East Lancs bodies. Yorkshire Rider took 42 in 1990 and 1991 (37 with Alexander bodies and five with Northern Counties bodies), while West Midlands Travel took 40 with Alexander bodies in 1990.

Nottingham City Transport would buy 23, while Midland Fox took 20, Mayne Coaches bought 16, and Kingston upon Hull City Transport took fourteen. There were also 13 for Northumbria Motor Services, 12 for Newport Transport, and ten each for Busways Travel Services (the former Tyne and Wear PTE undertaking), Cardiff Bus and Liverline of Liverpool. Other customers included Grey-Green, Borehamwood Travel Services, GM Buses, Midland Red North and Derby City Transport.

Busways was the first United Kingdom customer for the standard-floor single-decker in 1989, eventually taking 36, all with Alexander PS bodies. The biggest customer, however, was Yorkshire Rider, which bought 55 with Alexander Strider bodies in 1993 and 1994. Newport took 30 Strider-bodied versions between 1993 and 1997, while GRT Group took 26 with Wright Endurance bodies in 1994/95 for its Midland Bluebird and Lowland Scottish fleets. Cardiff Bus bought 14 with Plaxton Verde bodies in 1992 and a further seven with Strider bodies in 1994, while Nottingham took eight PS-bodied versions in 1990. Among other customers were Yorkshire Traction, Tayside Buses and Stevensons of Uttoxeter.

Of the 42 low-floor single-deckers, 30 Wright Pathfinder bodied examples were bought by London Buses in 1994 for trials at its East London and Leaside Buses subsidiaries. The other 12 carried an East Lancs body marketed jointly as the MaxCi, and of these, five went to Clydeside 2000, four to Midland Red North, and one to Tayside.

== Hong Kong ==
In 1993, Kowloon Motor Bus purchased two Alexander RH-bodied Scania N113 tri-axle double-deckers. The Alexander RH buses all have a double-curvature windscreen with an arched top. They were equipped with Scania DS11-74 engines (274 bhp) and Voith DIWA863 gearboxes.

Another 20 were purchased in 1996, but equipped with Scania's DSC11-24 engine instead of DS11-74. All were withdrawn between 2010 and 2014.

== Singapore ==
Singapore Bus Service took delivery of 200 Alexander PS bodied Scania N113CRBs in 1989 and 1990, 50 of which were air-conditioned and the remaining 150 non air-conditioned. Several of the non air-conditioned buses were retrofit with air conditioned in-between 1998 and 1999.

These Scania N113CRBs served mainly the eastern parts of Singapore and were predominantly under the control of the Bedok North Bus Depot, with a minority at Ang Mo Kio Depot, Braddell Bus Park and Hougang Bus Depot. They were transferred to SBS Transit on 1 November 2001 and progressive retired from 19 August 2008 to 1 May 2009. These buses were repainted between January 2004 until December 2007. Some of them were already replaced by Volvo B10M who in turn replaced by Scania K230UB. The N113CRBs operated on a majority of trunk, feeder and Townlink services in the East. They were powered by Scania DSC1104 engine (11,021cc), and some Scania GV680 or GAV781 transmissions. after these buses were refitted with Voith DIWA 863 3-speed gearbox will be replaced by their original Scania gearbox.

== Australia ==
Metro Tasmania purchased 147 Ansair bodied N113CRBs between 1989 and 1995.

== Replacement ==
In 1997, Scania introduced its 4-series range of buses, which utilised smaller and cleaner engines in order to comply with Euro2 emission limits. The N113 thus gave way to the low-floor, 9-litre-engined N94. However, N113 double-deckers continued to be sold in the UK until 2000, the last examples being a batch with East Lancs Cityzen bodies built for stock and sold to a variety of small operators. The N94 was eventually introduced to the UK in 2002, in both single-deck and double-deck forms.

For the Hong Kong market, Scania developed the low-floor Scania K94UB 6x2/4 double-decker bus, but only one prototype was built.
