= The Kings Ferry =

British coach operator in Kent, UK

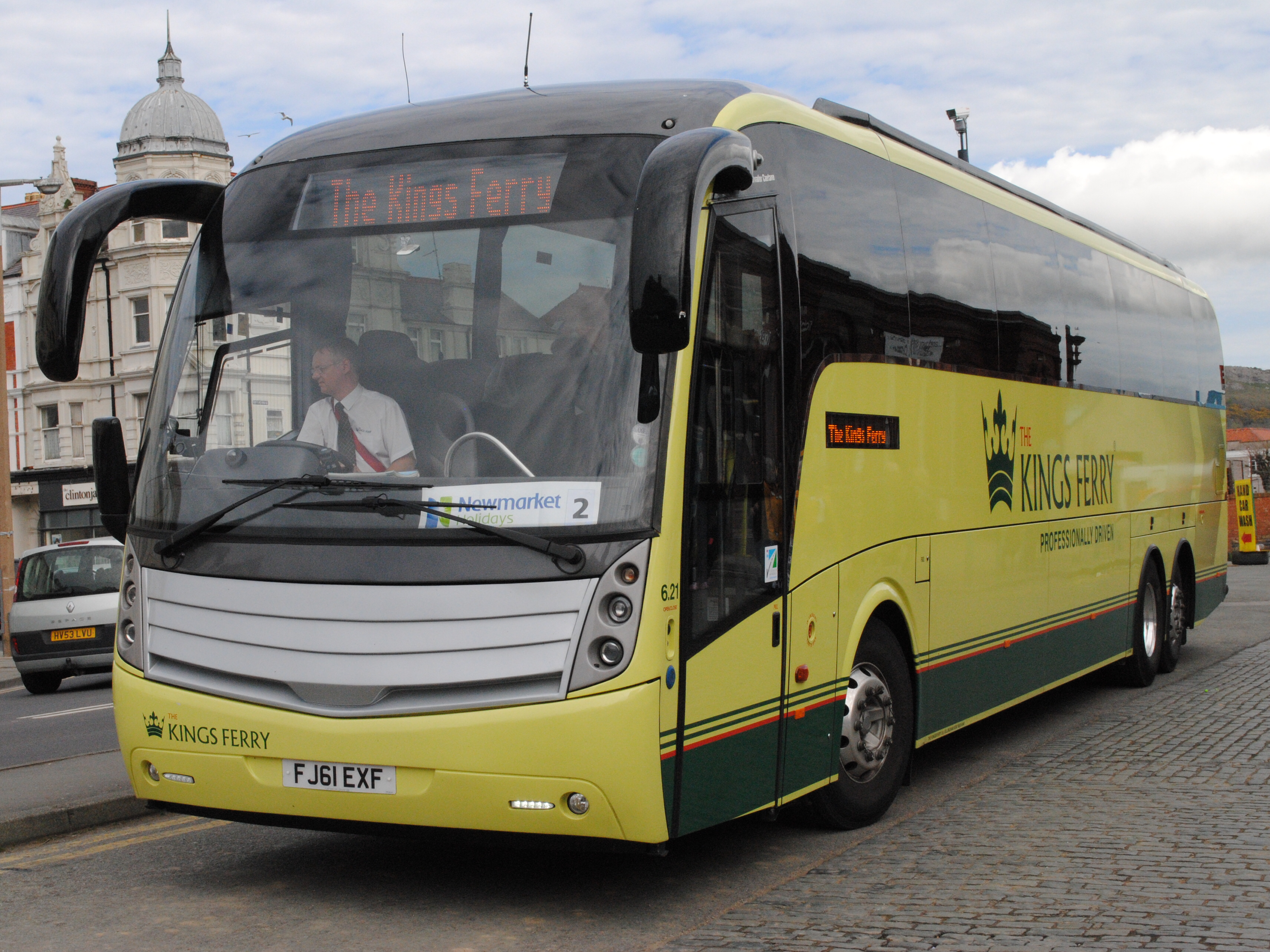
- Caetano Levante bodied Volvo B13R in May 2013
- Parent: The Coach Travel Group
- Founded: 1968
- Headquarters: Gillingham
- Hubs: Kent
- Website: thekingsferry.co.uk

The Kings Ferry is a coach operator based in Kent, England. Originally a commuter and private hire coach operator, under the new brand of The Kings Ferry Travel Group, the business expanded into VIP services, including car and helicopter hire and tourism services. In the main, the company operates base colour yellow with green striping coaches with a crown logo.

The Kings Ferry was established in 1968 by Peter O'Neill who remained as chairman until November 2007 when the Kings Ferry Travel Group was sold to National Express. In the late 1980s Peter was joined by his daughter and son, Vanessa and Steve, who helped him operate the business and to grow it to its peak of 85 vehicles operating internationally with its own coaches and worldwide with its Coach Hire Connections brand.

The Kings Ferry is named after the Kingsferry Bridge which links Swale with the Isle of Sheppey.

The company was sold to The Coach Travel Group in October 2025.

== Commuter services ==
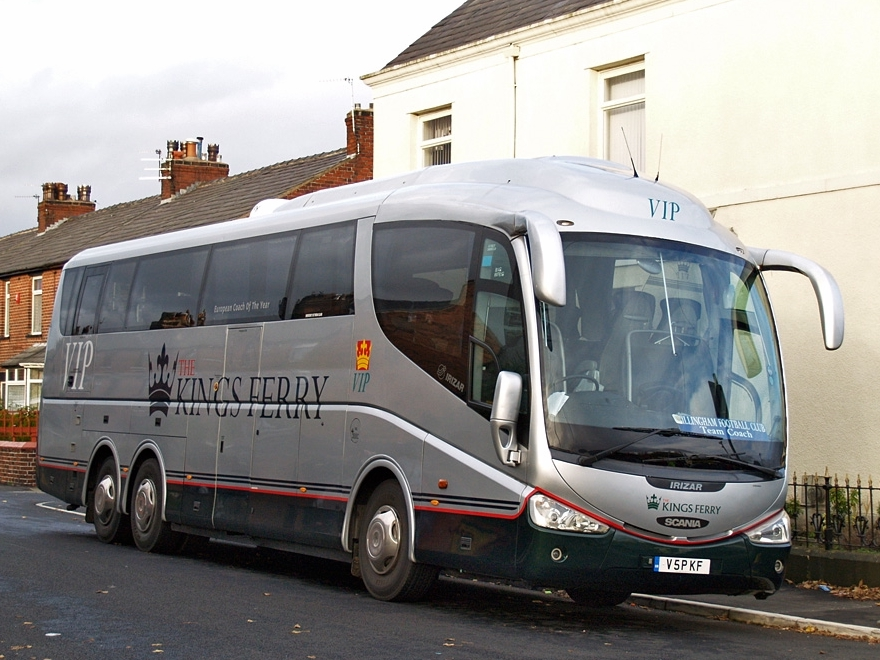
Irizar PB bodied Scania K124EB 6x2 in Kings Ferry VIP livery in November 2008

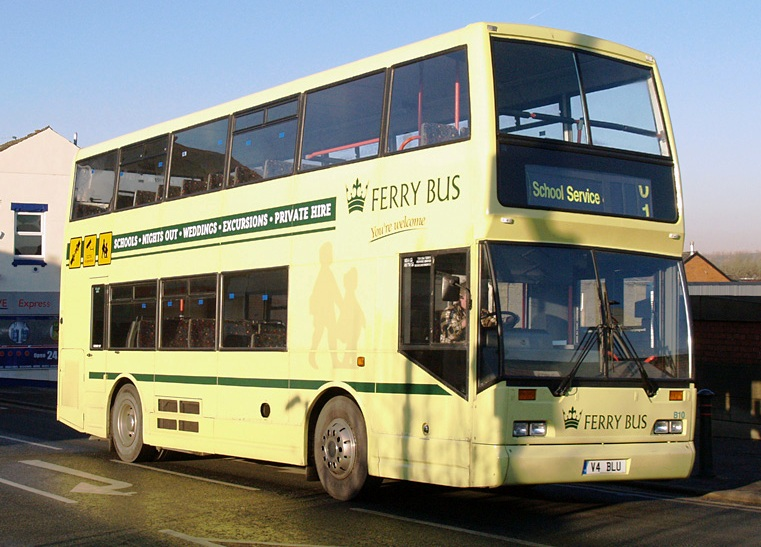
The former Ferrybus, an East Lancs Cityzen bodied Scania N113

The Kings Ferry brand is used on commuter services from the Medway Towns to Victoria Coach Station, London.

The Travel Link brand is used for commuter services from the Isle of Sheppey and Sittingbourne. Travel Link was created from a merger of the previous Travel Rite lower cost brand, and The London Link, a company established by the Kings Ferry in 1999.

From November 2013 until April 2016, Kings Ferry operated services in Bristol and South Gloucestershire under contract to North Somerset Council.

In October 2015, Kings Ferry commenced operating a service from Maidstone to London.

== The Coach Travel Group ==
In October 2025, it had been announced by Mobico Group that The Kings Ferry had been divested, joining former stablemates Lucketts Travel and Stewarts Coaches of Reading in the Tom Stables led company, The Coach Travel Group.

== Private hire ==
The Kings Ferry started in 1968 with one mini coach operating private hires and grew throughout the 1970s to a fleet of approximately 15 coaches. In 1982 after deregulation of bus services started commuter services from Medway to London. With constant upgrading of the fleet, The Kings Ferry was established as a premier operator in the coach sector. The Coach Hire Connections brand was launched linking The Kings Ferry with other worldwide operators to create a common gateway for coach hire, covering private hire up to executive corporate hire, using vehicles from 24 seat mini-coaches to 71 seat double-deckers.

== VIP services ==
The Kings Ferry gained experience of VIP travel service by providing coach services to such high-profile clients such as Premier League football clubs. Under the group's expansion, this has expanded into a separate VIP services division with the highest specification vehicles, from small mini-coaches to 35 seated full size coaches. The group also expanded into luxury car services and a helicopter hire operation.

== Bus services ==
The Kings Ferry purchased an open-top bus for promotional work. This bus was also used on a summer link up service in the Medway Towns.

The Kings Ferry has built up a small fleet of modern buses, for private contracts.

The Dockside Shuttle service used to operate from Chatham railway station to the Dockside Outlet Centre but this service seems to have been withdrawn in April 2012.
