= Arriva Northumbria =

British bus operating company

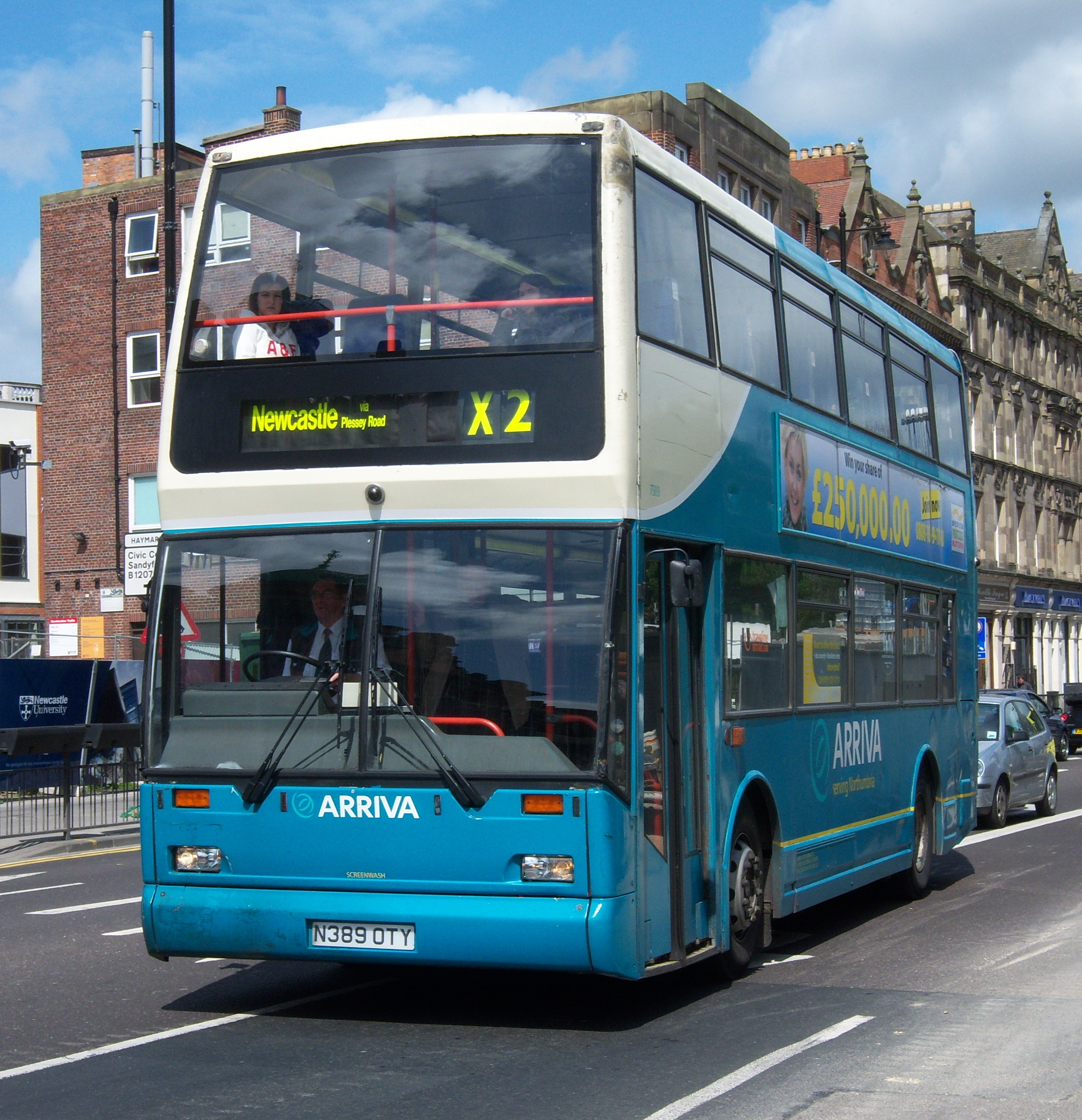
East Lancs Cityzen bodied Scania N113 in Newcastle upon Tyne in 2009

Arriva Northumbria operates in Northumberland, using the "Arriva serving Northumbria" name. They are considered now to have merged with Arriva North East.

== Brief history ==
United Automobile Services split into two parts in 1986, making it ready for privatisation. In October 1987 Northumbria was bought from National Bus Company by its management, using Proudmutual Group as a holding name. In March 1988 Proudmutual Group bought Kentish Bus. Moor Dale Coaches and Hunters were acquired. In 1994 the Proudmutual Group was bought by British Bus, and at the same time, Moor Dale Coaches was sold back to its former directors. British Bus was acquired by Cowie Group, and later renamed Arriva.

The point at which Cowie buys British Bus is where the history of Arriva North East gets involved.

== The fleet ==
The fleet comprised low-floor DAF single and double deck vehicles, Alexander Dennis E400 MMC and Wrightbus Streetlites based between two depots.

== Coach operations sale ==
In December 2006, Arriva North East – operating under the Arriva Northumbria banner – sold its national coaching operation to Classic Coaches, owned by Tellings-Golden Miller. Tellings-Golden Miller is now owned by Arriva.

The deal included 26 drivers and 7 coaches (Van Hool Alizée-bodied DAF SB3000 and SB4000), and routes:

- 032: London – Southampton
- 326: Newcastle – Cambridge
- 425: Ashington – Newcastle – London

== See also ==
- List of bus operators of the United Kingdom
