= Plaxton Verde =

Step-entrance single-deck bus body

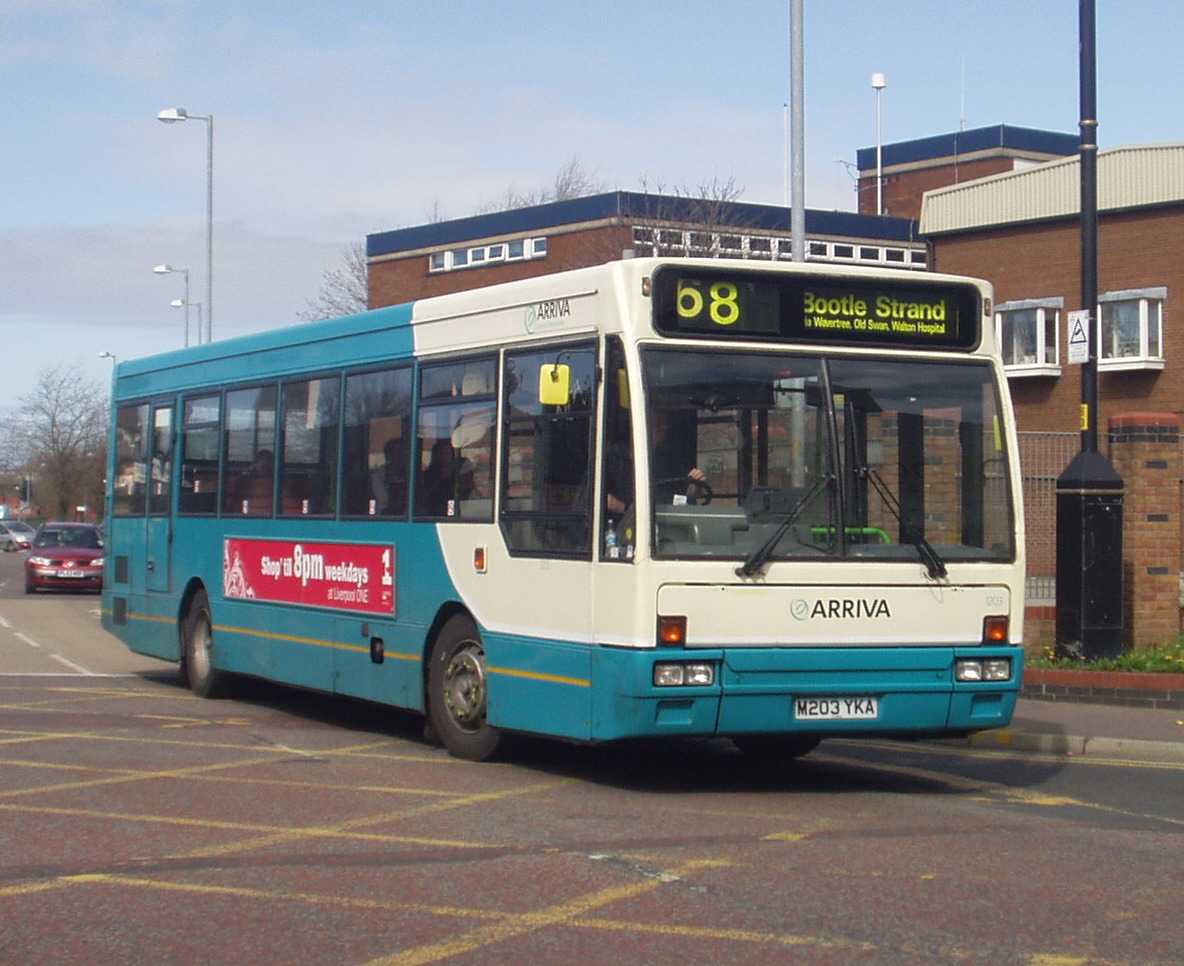
- Arriva North West & Wales Plaxton Verde bodied Dennis Lance in Bootle in April 2009

Overview
- Manufacturer: Plaxton
- Production: 1991–1997
- Assembly: Scarborough, England

Body and chassis
- Doors: 1 or 2
- Floor type: Step entrance
- Chassis: Dennis Lance; Volvo B10B; DAF SB220; Scania N113

Powertrain
- Capacity: 35 to 50 seated

Dimensions
- Length: 10.1–12.5 metres (33–41 ft)
- Width: 2.5 metres (8 ft 2 in)
- Height: 3.0 metres (9.8 ft)

The Plaxton Verde was a step-entrance full-size single-decker bus body manufactured by Plaxton between 1991 and 1997. It was built on a rear-engined chassis, the most popular of which was the Dennis Lance which accounted for over half of the Verdes built. The rest were on Volvo B10B, DAF SB220 and Scania N113 chassis.

== Design ==
Launched in March 1991 on the Scania N113 chassis as part of Plaxton's entry into city bus body manufacturing, with ambitions to export the model to Continental Europe, the Plaxton Verde, named in reference to the 'green' Scania DSC11 engine the bus was launched with, was built with an aluminium structure and has a flat-sided boxy shape, with the front of the bus featuring a distinctive two-piece "barrel-curvature" windscreen as well as four headlights as standard.

On early vehicles (primarily the Scania N113s and DAF SB220s), the side windows have rounded corners and the quarterlights extend below the windscreen. Later-built vehicles have square-cornered windows, an enlarged cab side window with an angled corner similar to the Plaxton Pointer, and the lower edge of the quarterlights level with that of the windscreen and of the cab window. Minor alterations were also made to the front dash panel. Verdes were identified by the letter L in Plaxton's post-1989 body numbering system.

== Operators ==
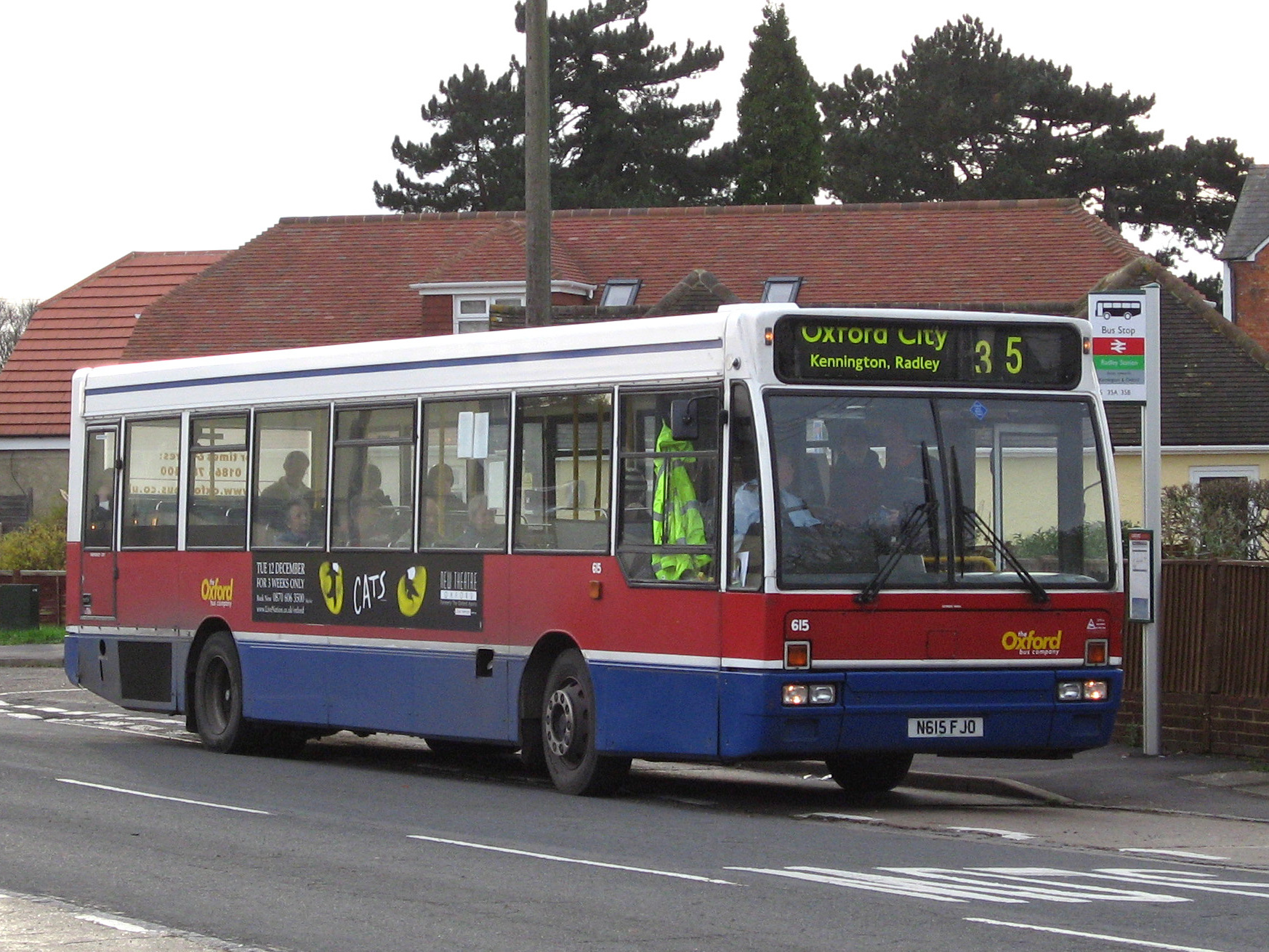
Oxford Bus Company Plaxton Verde bodied Volvo B10B in Radley in November 2006

Sales of the Verde body initially proved very slow, with only two demonstrators produced by Plaxton during 1991. A year after the Verde was launched, Cardiff Bus became the first bus operator in the United Kingdom to take delivery of the type, ordering 14 on Scania N113CRB chassis that were delivered in February 1992. These were followed in October 1993 by the delivery of ten Verdes on Dennis Lance chassis to South Wales Transport.

The first large operator to order Verdes was Dublin Bus, who took delivery of 40 dual-door Plaxton Verdes on DAF SB220 chassis in 1992 to introduce a new high-frequency brand known as 'CitySwift'. These Verdes received a number of modifications, mainly centred around the cab layout and overall strength, in order to be certified to Irish and European Economic Community standards. Throughout their service life, however, Dublin Bus' Verdes were plagued with structural problems and would return to Plaxton's Scarborough factory more than once for remedial treatment.

Other large purchasers were Yorkshire Rider (78), Midland Red West (56), Oxford Bus Company (43), Badgerline (16), Cleveland Transit (12), Clydeside 2000 (10) and North Western (10). London Buses subsidiary Selkent's Catford garage took delivery of twelve dual-door Verdes on Dennis Lance chassis in 1994 for use on route 208. Over 330 were built.

== See also ==
- List of buses
