= Mayne Coaches =

Coach operator in Manchester and Warrington

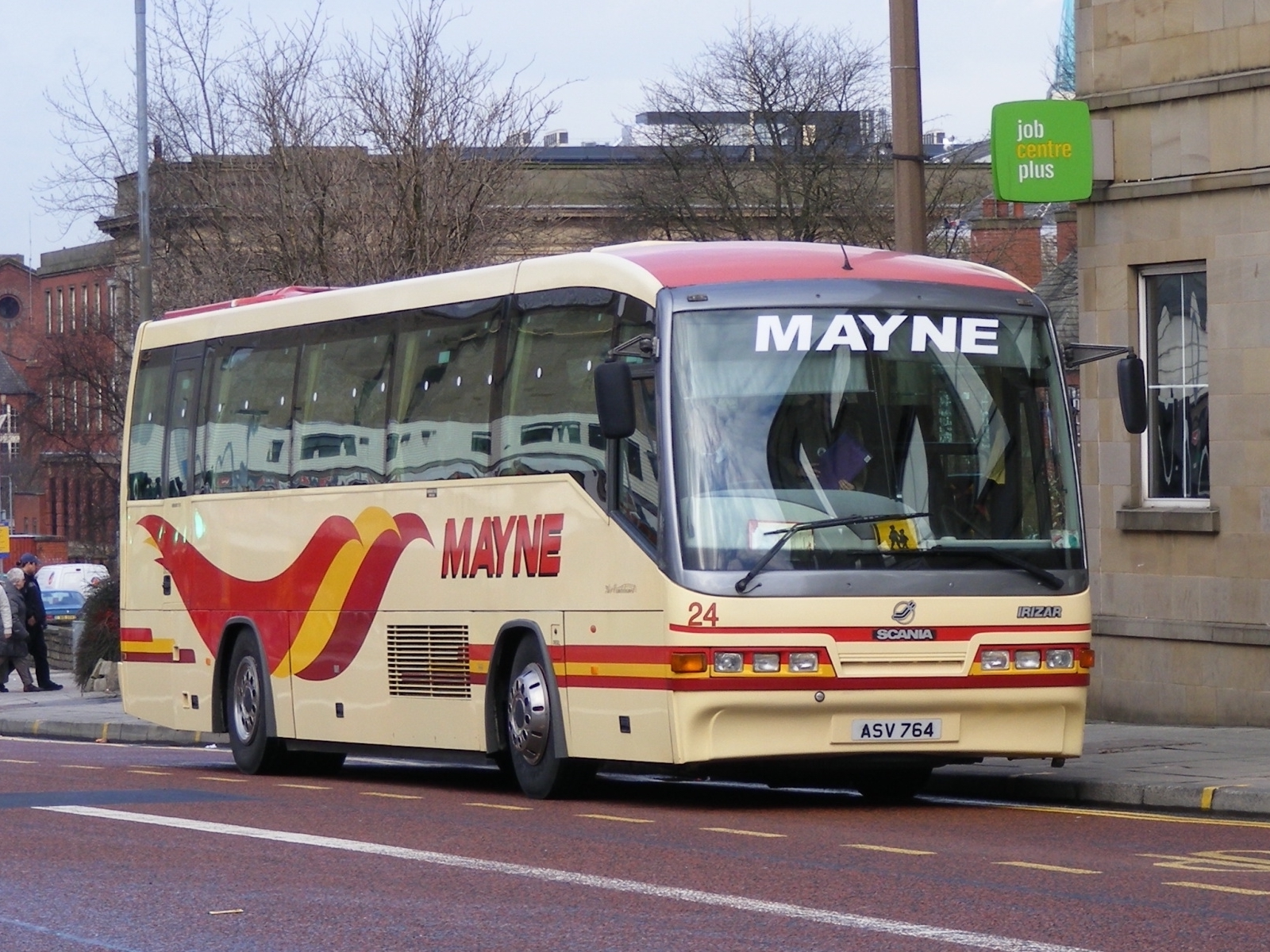
- Irizar InterCentury bodied Scania L94IB in Bolton in February 2008
- Parent: Mayne family (until 2022)
- Founded: 1920
- Headquarters: Warrington (until 2022)
- Service area: Greater Manchester; Warrington
- Service type: Coach operator
- Depots: 2 (until 2022)
- Fleet: 51 (September 2013)
- Website: www.mayne.co.uk

Mayne Coaches was a coach operator that had depots in Manchester and Warrington. Administrators were appointed to the business, following an insolvency notice issued on 14 February 2022. Mayne Coaches now operates under the Orion Travel Group, Manchester. The company has no connection to Maynes Coaches, Buckie Scotland.

== History ==
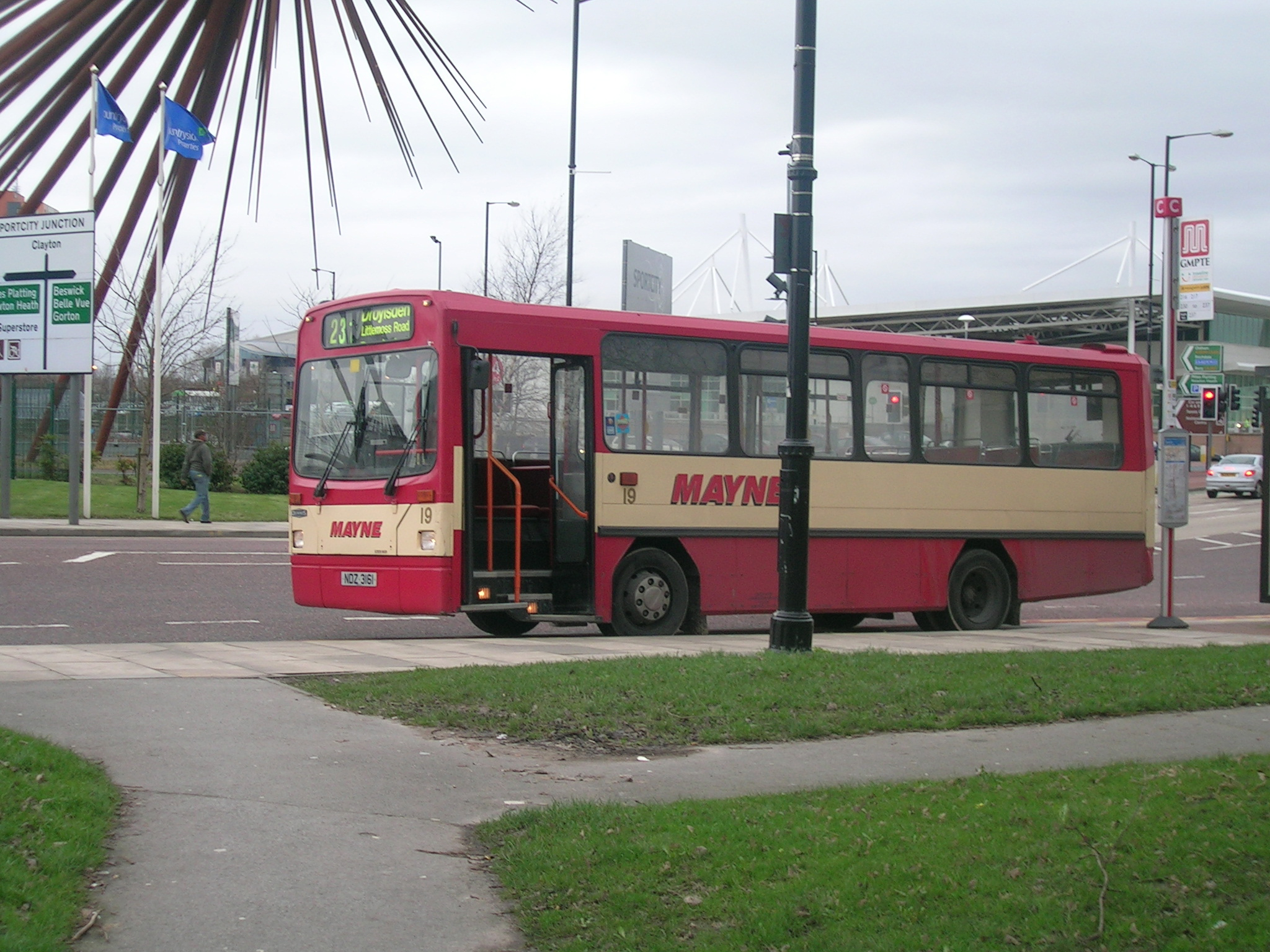
Wright Handybus bodied Dennis Dart in January 2008

The company (A Mayne and Son) was formed by Arthur Mayne before the First World War, originally delivering furniture from its shop in Bradford, Manchester. In the 1920s Maynes branched out into coach excursions, running trips to the coast and to Buxton. They would later expand to operate trips to football matches and race meetings. By the start of the 1930s, the company had decided to concentrate on passenger transport and would continue to grow during the 1930s moving from Beswick to its present headquarters in Clayton.

Coach services ceased when the Second World War broke out and struggled to recover after the war ended, with the costs of fuel, labour and vehicles rising and passenger numbers dropped due to the increase of cars on the road. During the 1960s, the company received numerous take over offers from Manchester Corporation Transport. By resisting the offers, the company was able to grow steadily and would increase its services in the 1980s.

In 1982 Barry Cooper Coaches of Warrington was purchased with 20 coaches by members of the Mayne family. Although this was originally a separate business to Mayne, the Mayne name and red and cream livery were soon adopted. In 1989 the coach operations in Manchester expanded into the Fairclough Street depot. In 1998 Barry Cooper Coaches was renamed Mayne Coaches, and moved to its present site.

Over the years the company has grown from an initial purpose built coach in 1925 and new bus in 1929, with expansion coming through acquisition of local bus and coach operators, and through purchases of new buses and coaches. The company resisted numerous attempts at nationalisation due to a licensing agreement made in 1930 with Manchester Corporation regarding bus service provision.

In January 2008 Mayne's bus division was sold to Stagecoach Manchester. The Ashton New Road bus depot was sold to supermarket chain Aldi, which commenced demolition in December 2007. The bus fleet then briefly operated from the Fairclough Street coach depot, supplemented with temporary parking at the adjacent Manchester Velodrome. After obtaining Office of Fair Trading clearance on 10 January 2008, the sale of the fleet and registrations was completed on 21 January 2008.

The company remained as a coach operator, and was under the ownership of Stephen Mayne until he died in July 2012. Mayne Coaches limited was then operated by the Mayne family before being put into voluntary administration in February 2022. It was then acquired from the administrators by Go Goodwins Group LTD, Eccles, Manchester, before being sold to the Orion Travel Group starting 1 January 2025.

A Mayne & Son Ltd remains a property investment company in the ownership of the Mayne family. It retains all intellectual property associated with Mayne bus and coach operations, excluding that associated with Barry Cooper Coaches Limited(later Mayne Coaches Ltd) which went into voluntary administration as noted above.

== Former bus services ==
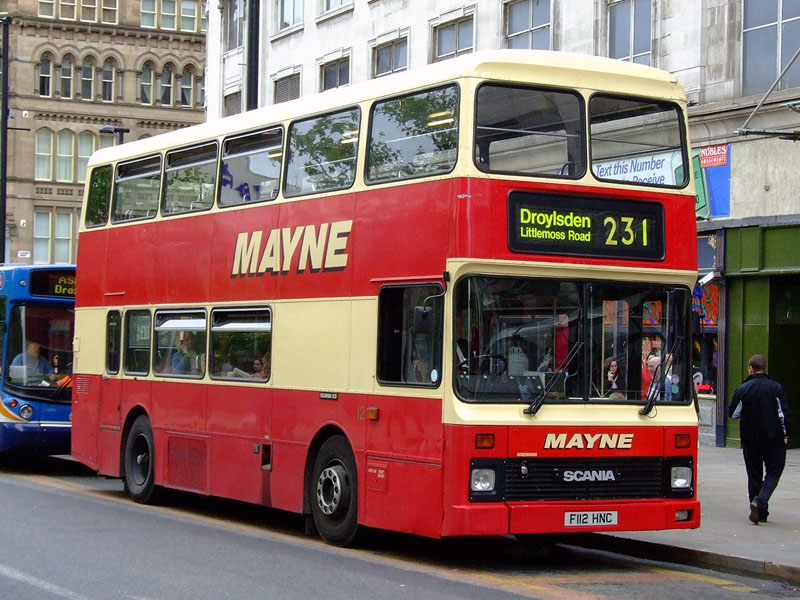
Northern Counties Palatine bodied Scania N113 in June 2006

Bus services were operated by a separate legal entity, A Mayne & Son Ltd., mainly in East Manchester, with the majority of services running between Ashton-under-Lyne and Manchester via Ashton New Road.

Following the sale, the 37 bus fleet was transferred to Stagecoach Manchester's Hyde Road depot and repainted into Stagecoach livery.

== Fleet ==
As of September 2013, the fleet consisted of 51 coaches.

== Depots ==
Mayne Coaches operated out of depots in Clayton and Warrington when it was under the ownership of the Mayne family.
