= Dennis Lance =

Step-entrance and low-floor single-deck bus chassis

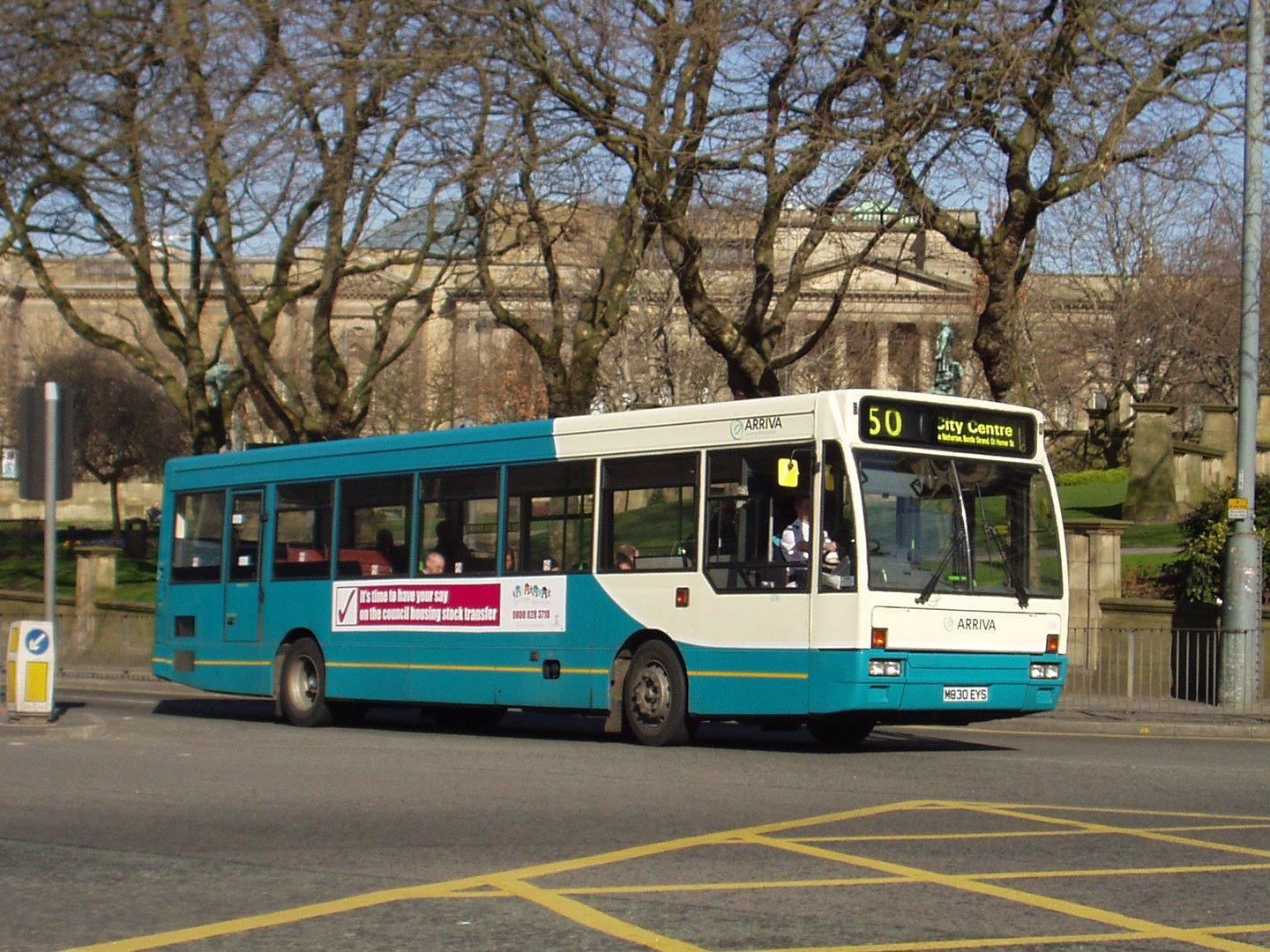
- Arriva North West & Wales Plaxton Verde bodied Dennis Lance in Liverpool in March 2007

Overview
- Manufacturer: Dennis
- Also called: Dennis Arrow
- Production: 1991–2000
- Assembly: Guildford, Surrey, England

Body and chassis
- Doors: 1 or 2
- Floor type: Lance/Arrow; Step entrance; Lance SLF; Low floor
- Related: Dennis Trident 3

Powertrain
- Engine: Cummins C6T
- Capacity: Lance/Lance SLF; Up to 74 passengers; Arrow; 76-84 seated, 11-16 standing
- Transmission: ZF Ecomat 4HP 500 4-speed ZF Ecomat 5HP 500 5-speed

Dimensions
- Length: 10–11.6 metres (33–38 ft)
- Width: 2.5 metres (8 ft 2 in)
- Curb weight: Lance; 5,410–5,580 kilograms (11,930–12,300 lb); Lance SLF; 6,240 kilograms (13,760 lb); Arrow; 5,610 kilograms (12,370 lb)

Chronology
- Predecessor: Dennis Falcon (Lance); Dennis Dominator (Arrow)
- Successor: Dennis Dart (Lance); Dennis Trident 2 (Arrow)

The Dennis Lance was a single-decker bus chassis manufactured by Dennis between 1991 and 2000, replacing the Dennis Falcon. Its low floor variant, the Dennis Lance SLF (Super Low Floor) was built between 1993 and 1996. Between 1995 and 1998, Dennis also built its double-deck variant, the Dennis Arrow (initially marketed as a double-deck Dennis Lance), as the replacement of the Dennis Dominator.

== History ==
=== Lance ===
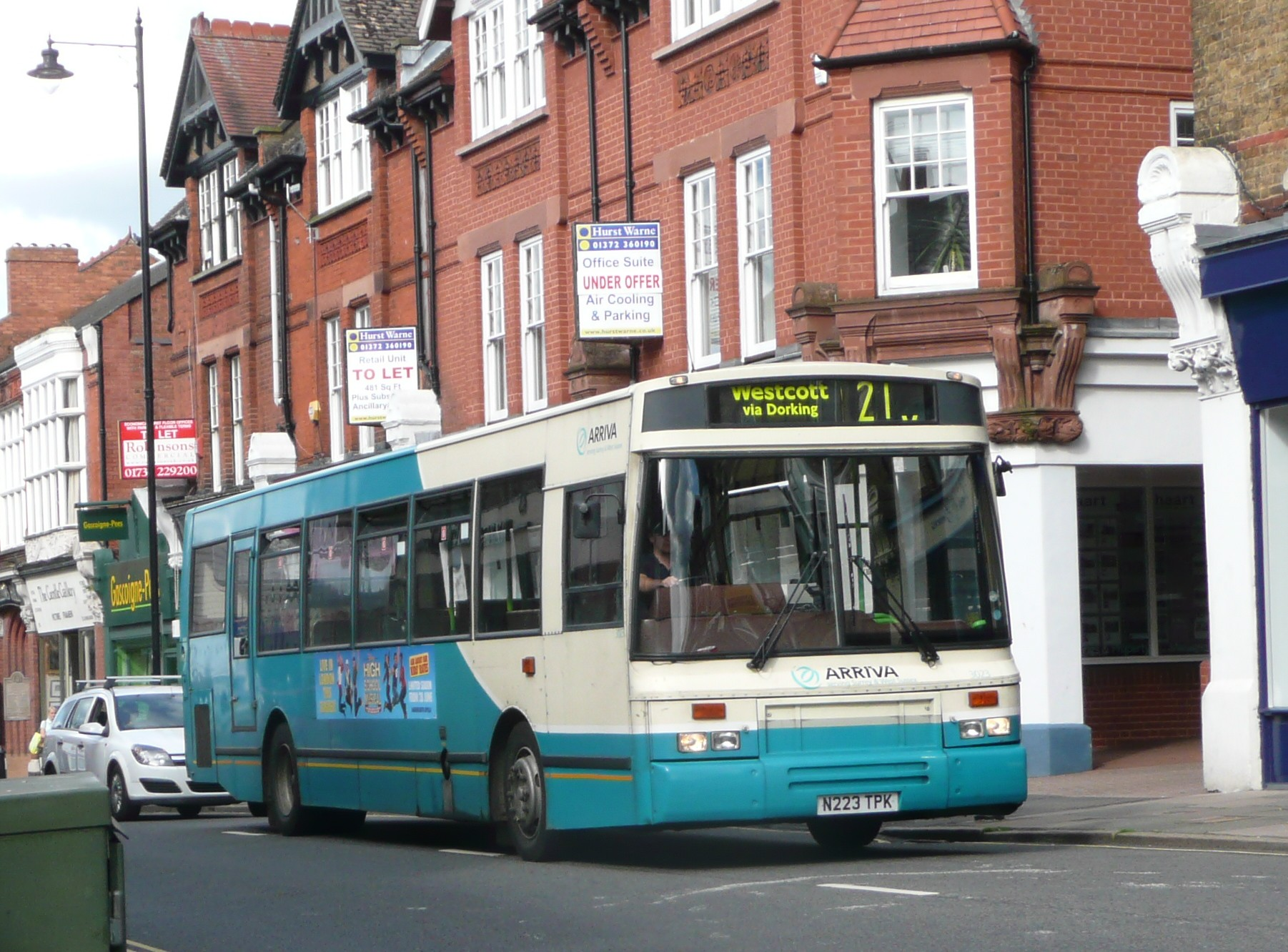
Arriva Guildford & West Surrey East Lancs EL2000 bodied Dennis Lance in Dorking in July 2008

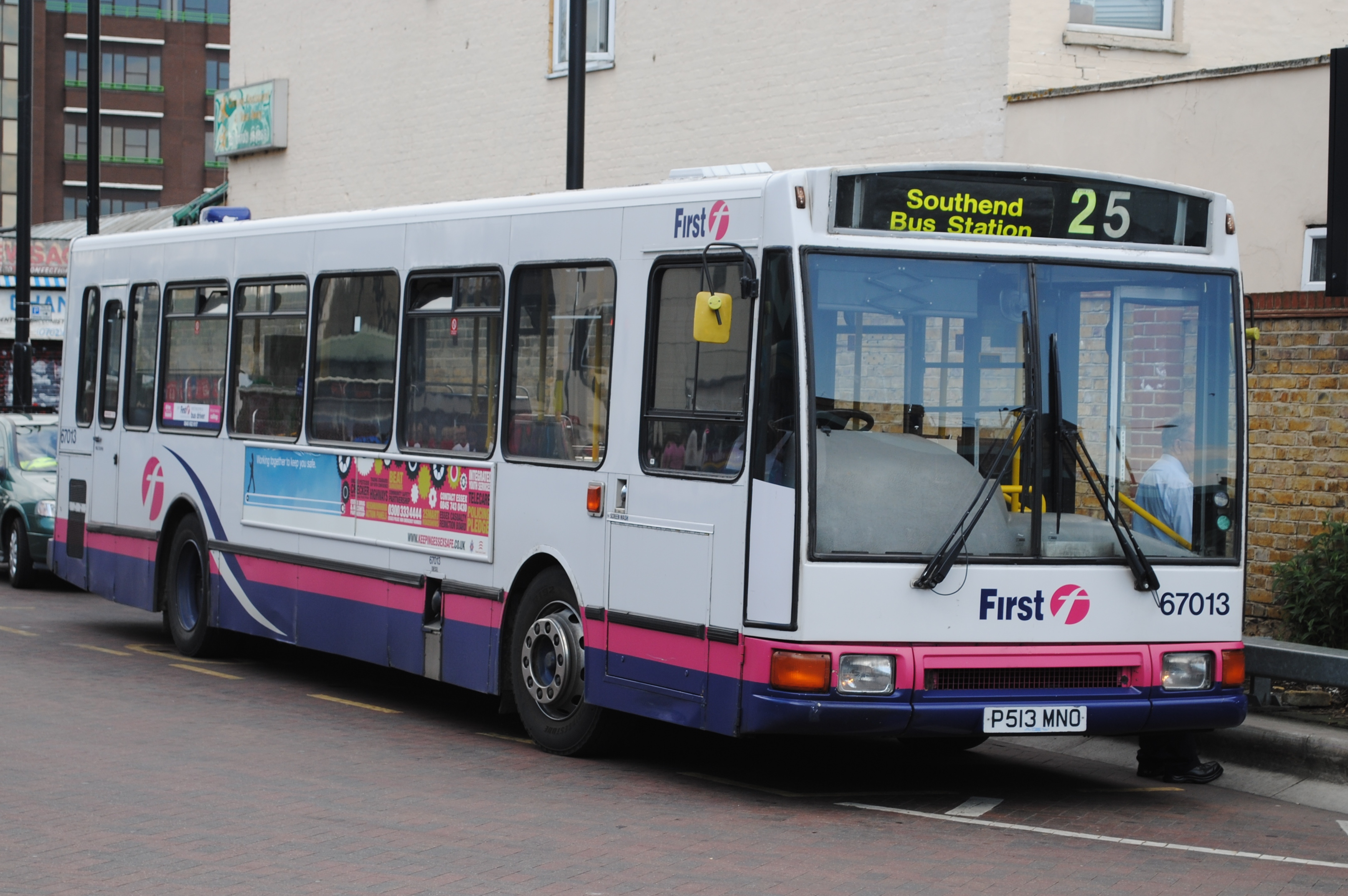
First Essex Northern Counties Paladin bodied Dennis Lance in Colchester in October 2008

The Dennis Lance was unveiled at the 1991 Coach & Bus Show as both a larger version of the Dennis Dart and the successor to the Dennis Falcon chassis. The first Dennis product to be developed at the manufacturer's new Guildford factory with computer-aided design, the rear-engined Lance chassis was designed with an inline driveline and longitudinally-mounted Cummins C6T engine, claimed to improve fuel economy by 15% when compared to conventional "angle drive" drivelines. It was also developed to fit the recommendations of the Disabled Persons Transport Advisory Committee (DiPTAC) on improving accessibility, equipped with 275 millimetres (10.8 in) entrance and interior steps as standard.

The Lance was available with a number of bodies, including the Alexander PS and Strider, the East Lancs EL2000, the Northern Counties Paladin, the Optare Sigma and Delta, and the Plaxton Verde. Ipswich Buses was the first operator in the United Kingdom to order the Lance, taking delivery of a single example with East Lancs EL2000 bodywork in 1991; the operator subsequently took delivery of two more EL2000s and an Optare Sigma built on the Lance chassis during 1994. London Buses subsidiary Selkent later took delivery of 16 Alexander PS bodied Lances in April 1992 for use on route 36B, replacing AEC Routemasters used on the service.

The Lance was most popular on the Plaxton Verde chassis, with the largest orders coming from Badgerline Group companies Midland Red West and Yorkshire Rider, the latter of which were delivered to Huddersfield for 'Flagship' services. Orders of Verde-bodied Lances continued under FirstBus, with a further 30 delivered under FirstBus for the rebranded Leeds City Link operation. London Buses subsidiary Selkent's Catford garage also took delivery of twelve dual-door Verdes bodied Lances in 1994 for use on London Buses route 208. Other operators of Verde-bodied Lances included Busways Travel Services, Clydeside 2000, North Western, Nottingham City Transport, Potteries Motor Traction, and South Wales Transport.

Lances built on other bodies proved particularly popular during 1993. The Caldaire Group took delivery of 30 Lances with Alexander Strider bodywork in 1993, distributing 18 of the order to Yorkshire Woollen and the remaining 12 to West Riding. with municipal bus companies Grimsby-Cleethorpes Transport and Yellow Buses of Bournemouth taking fleets of nine and six Lances with East Lancs EL2000 bodies respectively in the same year. 31 Lances with Northern Counties Paladin bodywork were delivered to Metroline's Cricklewood bus garage for routes 113 and 302, and five with Northern Counties Paladin bodies were delivered to Eastern Counties in 1993.

Towards the end of the step-entrance Lance's production, Go-Ahead Northern's Gateshead & District operation took delivery of fifteen Lances with Optare Delta bodywork in 1994, and on the Optare Sigma body, fellow Go-Ahead Group subsidiary Brighton & Hove took delivery of 20 during 1996 while Wellglade Group operator Trent Buses took delivery of seventeen between 1994 and 1995. British Bus subsidiary London & Country took delivery of fifteen East Lancs EL2000 bodied Lances in April 1996, while the last step-entrance Lances produced for the United Kingdom were thirteen with Northern Counties Paladin bodies for First Eastern National, followed by three for First PMT, in 1997.

=== Lance SLF ===
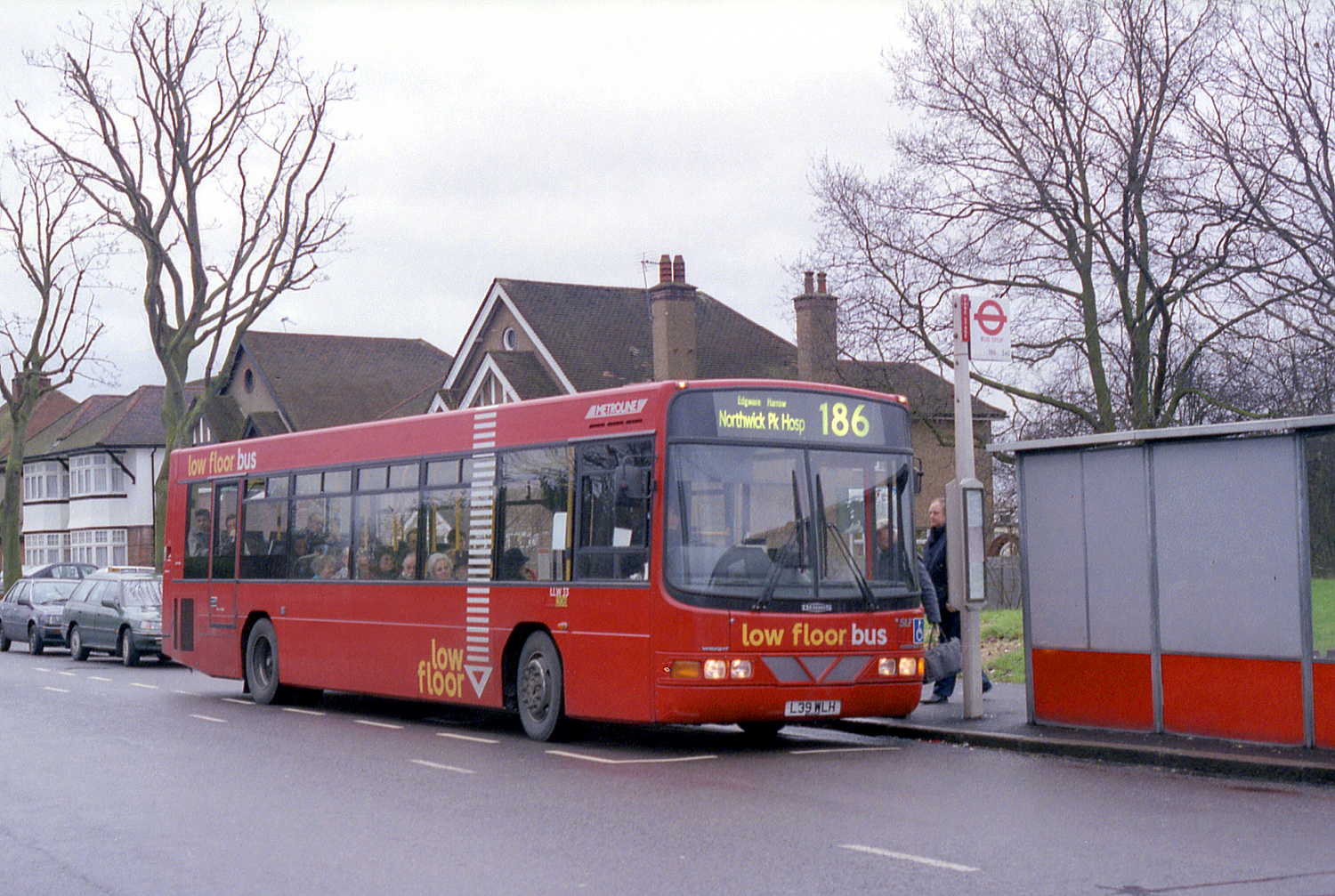
Metroline Wright Pathfinder bodied Dennis Lance SLF on route 186

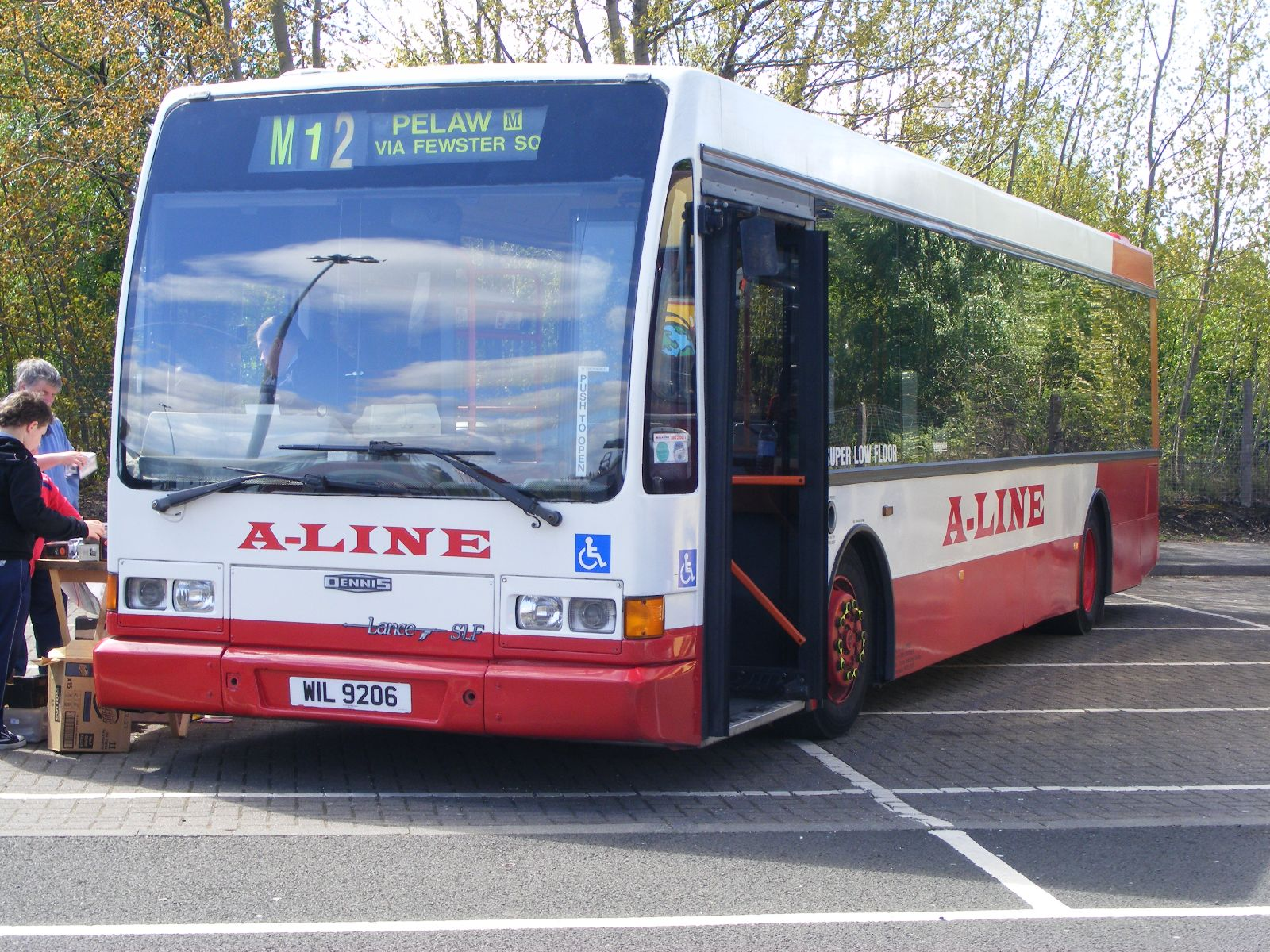
A-Line Berkhof bodied Dennis Lance SLF in May 2009

In March 1993, the "Super Low Floor" Dennis Lance SLF was unveiled, becoming the first low-floor bus chassis manufactured in the United Kingdom. the Lance SLF came with an independent kneeling front suspension as standard, capable of lowering the step-free entrance from 320 millimetres (13 in) to 250 millimetres (9.8 in). A wheelchair ramp was also provided as standard. The Lance SLF was also the first new bus chassis in the United Kingdom to be fitted with disc brakes as standard, which were manufactured by Girling.

Of around 105 Lance SLFs built, the majority were built with Wright Pathfinder bodywork. The most notable of these were 38 dual-doored examples for London Buses for use on the first London bus routes to be converted to low-floor operation. The recipients of this order were London United for use on route 120, Metroline for use on route 186, and CentreWest for use on route 222. A single-door Pathfinder was later launched in 1994, marketed towards bus operators based outside London. The first of these, part of a trial project funded by the Department of Transport, was delivered to Go-Ahead Northern's Coastline Buses operation for use on services linking Whitley Bay, Tynemouth and North Shields, making Coastline one of the first bus operators in the United Kingdom outside of London to place low-floor buses into service.

Further Pathfinder-bodied Lance SLFs included five delivered to London & Country, with six also delivered to Badgerline for service in Bath, and a sole example delivered to Western National during 1995. Ten Pathfinder bodied Lance SLFs were supplied with 40% funding from Essex County Council to West Midlands Travel's County Bus & Coach subsidiary, Southend Transport and Hedingham Omnibus in 1994, part of the UK's first low-floor project to be funded by a county council without funding from the government or the European Union. Some Pathfinder-bodied Lance SLFs were prematurely withdrawn from service due to suspension strut failures, a result of water ingress caused by outside storage of the chassis at Wright's Ballymena factory before the bodies were built.

The Lance SLF chassis was also built with Berkhof Excellence 1000 NL bodywork, with 30 dual-purpose specialist vehicles delivered to the British Airports Authority for use on staff shuttle duties at Heathrow Airport between 1994 and 1995. Five each were also delivered to Stagecoach East Kent and Stagecoach Ribble, the latter of which were the last Lance SLFs produced before the type was discontinued in 1996.

=== Arrow ===
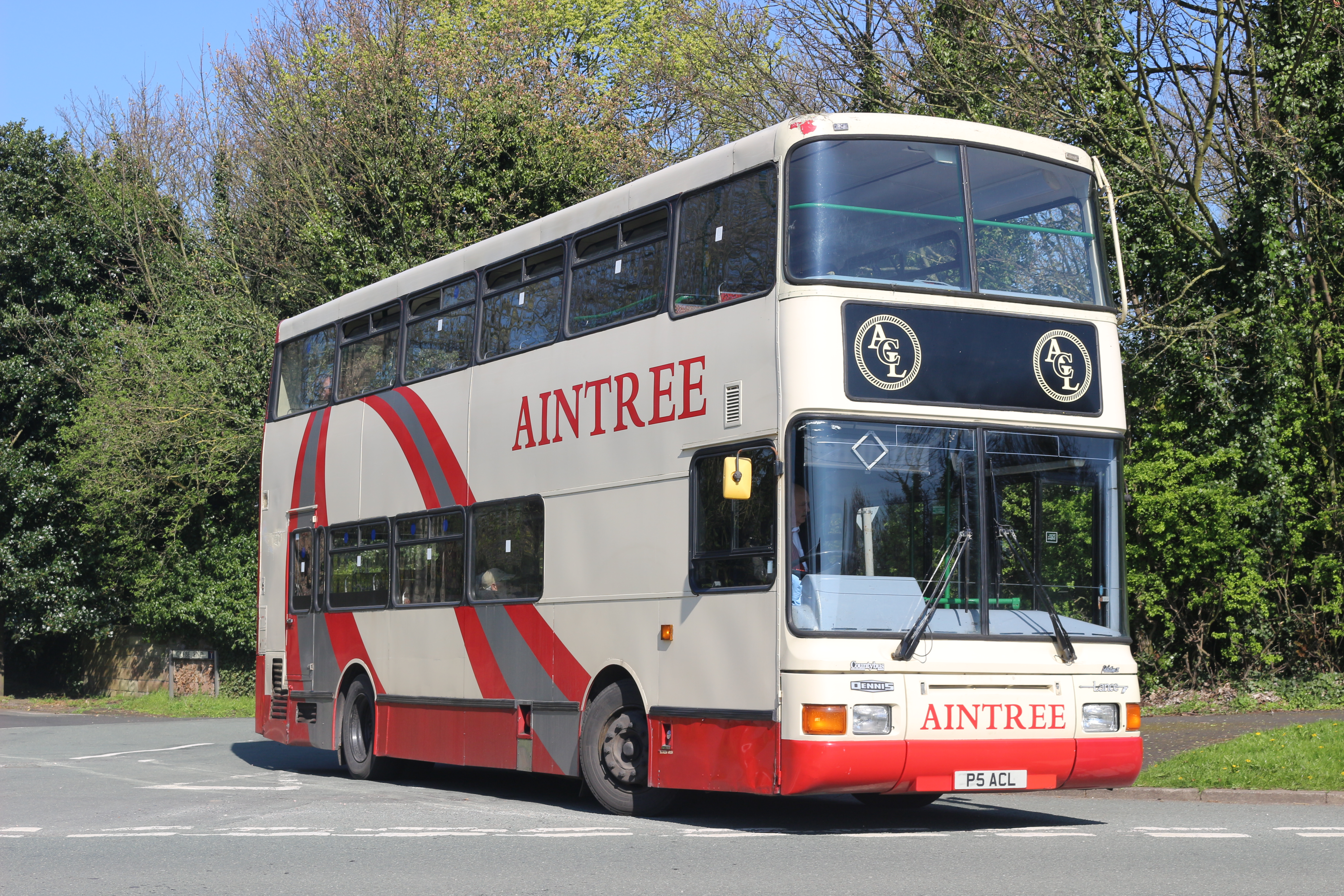
Aintree Coachline Northern Counties Palatine II bodied Dennis Arrow in April 2017

A double-deck version of the Lance was launched in 1995 as a replacement for the Dennis Dominator chassis. Later renamed to the Dennis Arrow, it was available with Northern Counties Palatine II and East Lancs E Type and Pyoneer bodywork, and only differed from the step-entrance single-deck Lance through the addition of an anti-roll bar and shock absorbers being moved towards the rear of the chassis. At a maximum capacity of 84 seats and 16 standing passengers, the Arrow could carry a total of 100 passengers.

The Arrow was sold to just five operators in the United Kingdom, with Capital Citybus taking a total 54 of the 73 Arrows built with both Palatine II and Pyoneer bodywork, London & Country taking ten with EL2000 bodywork, and Nottingham City Transport taking four with Palatine II bodywork. Smaller operators included Aintree Coachline, who took a single Arrow with Palatine II bodywork, London Coachlines, who took a single Arrow with Pyoneer bodywork, and two purpose-built playbuses built with both bodies. The Dennis Arrow was superseded by the low-floor Dennis Trident 2 in 1998.

== Exports ==
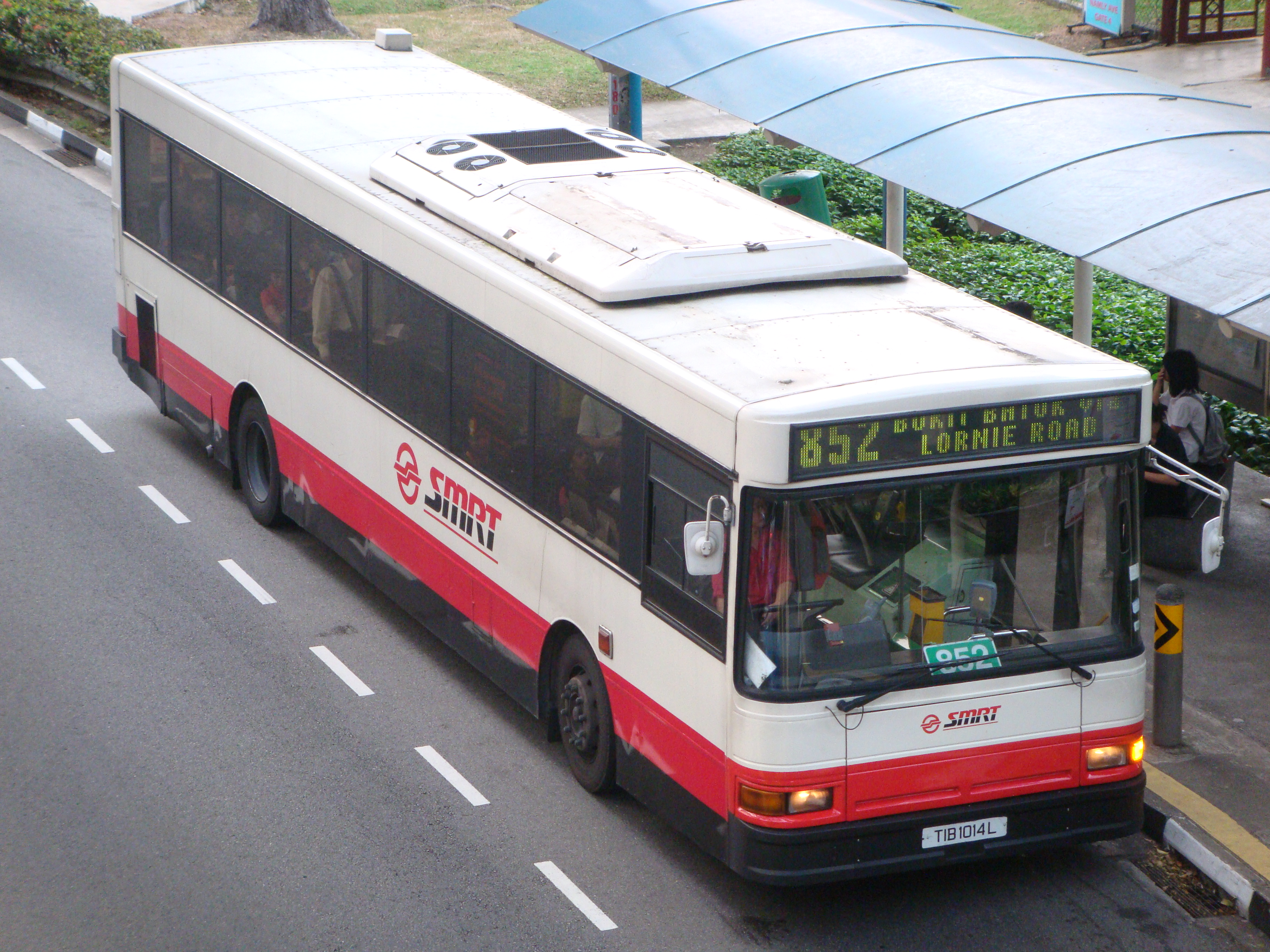
SMRT Buses Duple Metsec bodied Dennis Lance in August 2009

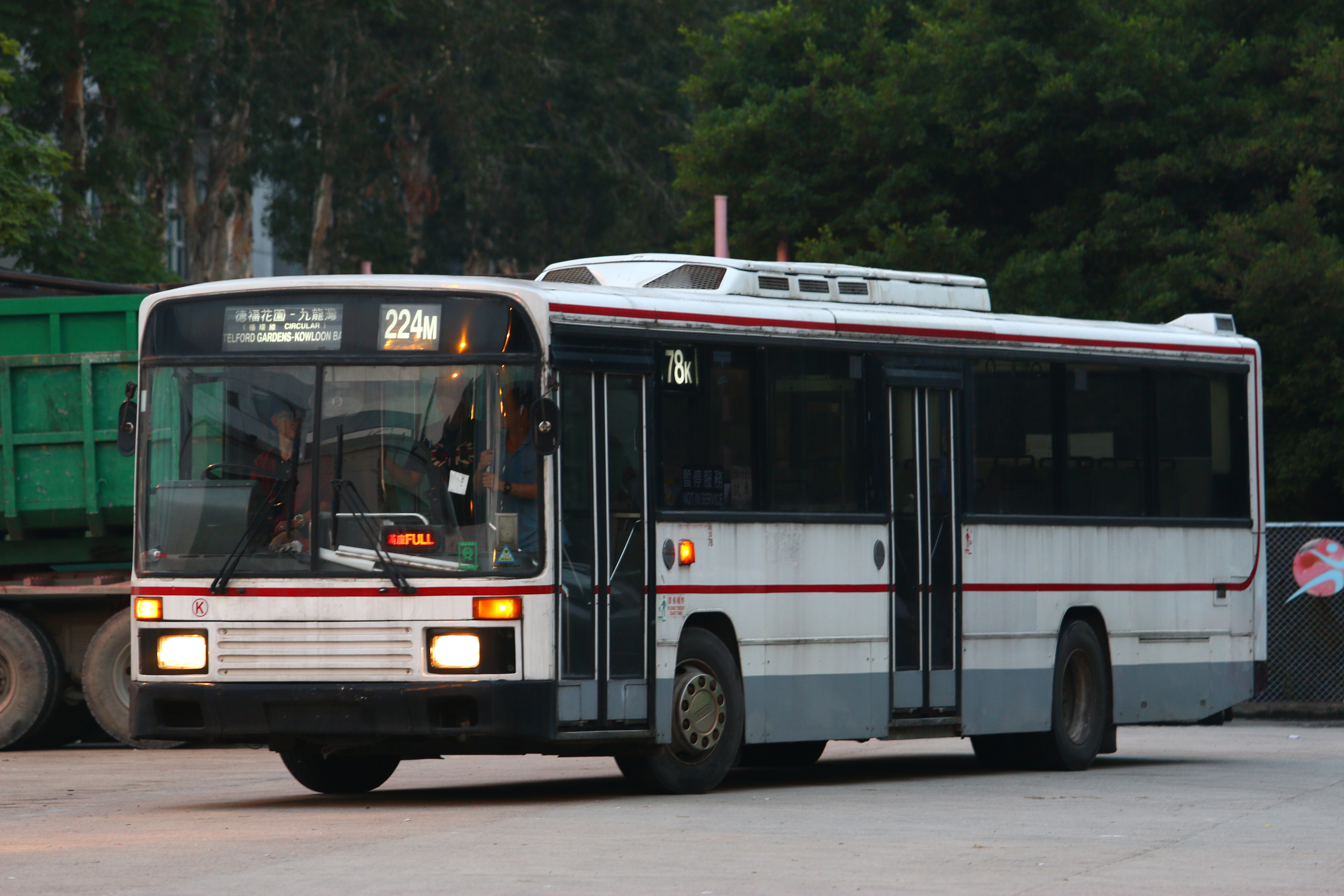
Kowloon Motor Bus Alexander PS bodied Dennis Lance in November 2013.

The step-entrance single-deck Dennis Lance had a level of export success to Continental Europe. In the Netherlands, a single Lance with Berkhof Excellence 1000 NL bodies were delivered to Noord-Zuid-Hollandsche Stoomtramweg-Maatschappij (NZH) in 1995, resulting in a repeat order for six being delivered to the operator for use in Haarlem during 1996. Three Lances with Duple Metsec bodywork were also exported to Miejskie Zakłady Autobusowe (MZA) of Warsaw, Poland between 1992 and 1993.

The Lance also proved popular in the Asian export market. A joint venture between Dennis and Malaysian manufacturer UMW Specialist Vehicles would build complete knock-down Lance chassis (known as the UMW-Dennis Lance) for the Southeast Asian market. In Malaysia, a fleet of Duple Metsec bodied UMW-Dennis Lances were delivered to Naeila Corps, shortly before the company was bought over by Causeway Link, while Transit Link JB also operated a small number of similar examples. In Singapore, meanwhile, Trans-Island Bus Services ordered 72 Lances, of which 52 were built by UMW-Dennis; most were fitted with Duple Metsec bodywork while the last two were fitted with Volgren bodywork. A single UMW-Dennis Lance with Duple Metsec bodywork was also operated by Ritchies Coachlines in New Zealand.

In Hong Kong, 24 Lances with Alexander PS bodywork were delivered to Kowloon Motor Bus in 1992.
