= LVI Corps =

LVI Corps or 56th Corps may refer to:

- 56th Corps (German Empire)
- LVI Panzer Corps, Wehrmacht, Germany
- 56th (Salford) Lancashire Rifle Volunteer Corps, United Kingdom

== See also ==
- List of military corps by number
- 56th Army (disambiguation)
- 56th Brigade (disambiguation)
- 56th Division (disambiguation)
- 56th Regiment (disambiguation)
- 56th (disambiguation)
- LVI (disambiguation)
