= 56th Army =

56th Army may refer to:

- Fifty-Sixth Army (Japan), Imperial Japanese Army
- 56th Army (Soviet Union)

== See also ==
- List of armies by number
- 56th Division (disambiguation)
- 56th Brigade (disambiguation)
- 56th Regiment (disambiguation)
- 56th Squadron (disambiguation)
- 56th (disambiguation)
