= 56th Cavalry =

56th Cavalry may refer to:

- 56th Cavalry Brigade, United States
- 56th Alabama Cavalry Regiment, Confederate States Army
- 56th (Buckinghamshire) Company, Imperial Yeomanry

== See also ==
- 56th Division (disambiguation)
- 56th Brigade (disambiguation)
- 56th Regiment (disambiguation)
- 56th (disambiguation)
