= 56th =

Fifty-sixth is the ordinal form of the number 56. Fifty-sixth or 56th may also refer to:

- A fraction, 1/56, equal to one of 56 equal parts

== Geography ==
- 56th meridian east, a line of longitude
- 56th meridian west, a line of longitude
- 56th parallel north, a circle of latitude
- 56th parallel south, a circle of latitude
- 56th Street (disambiguation)

== Military ==
- 56th Brigade (disambiguation)
- 56th Division (disambiguation)
- 56th Regiment (disambiguation)
- 56th Squadron (disambiguation)

== Other ==
- 56th century
- 56th century BC

== See also ==
- 56 (disambiguation)
