= Wright StreetDeck =

Low-floor double-decker bus on integral chassis

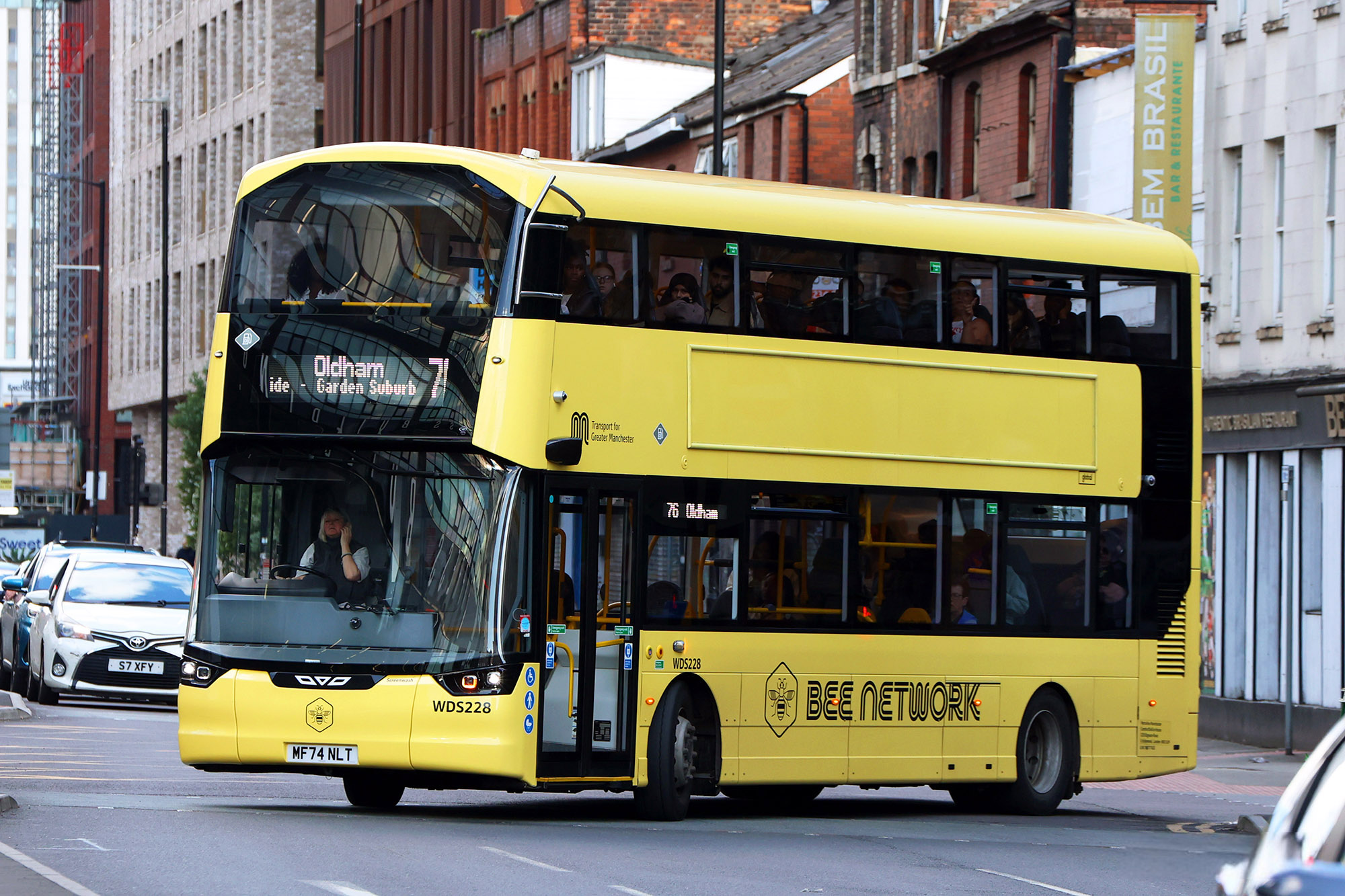
- Metroline Manchester second generation Wright StreetDeck Ultroliner in June 2025

Overview
- Manufacturer: Wrightbus
- Production: 2014–present
- Assembly: Ballymena, Northern Ireland

Body and chassis
- Class: Double-decker bus
- Doors: 1 or 2
- Floor type: Low floor
- Chassis: Integral
- Related: Wright Eclipse Gemini 3 Wright StreetLite; Wright GB Hawk; Wright GB Kite

Powertrain
- Engine: Ultroliner; Daimler OM934 5.1 litre 4-cylinder Euro VI Daimler OM936 7.7-litre 6-cylinder Euro VI; Cummins 6.7 ISB 6-cylinder Euro VI
- Capacity: 73–104
- Power output: 231 horsepower (172 kW) (OM934); 250–300 horsepower (190–220 kW) (Cummins 6.7 ISB)
- Transmission: Voith DIWA D854.6 four-speed; Voith DIWA.8 NXT seven-speed (Cummins 6.7 ISB)
- Battery: Electroliner; 340/454 kWh Forsee Power NMC; 442 kWh CATL LFP; Hydroliner; 85 kW Ballard FCveloCity fuel cell 27.4 kWh battery 27kg hydrogen storage
- Range: Electroliner; 150–200 miles (240–320 km) (Forsee Power); 275 miles (443 km) (CATL); Hydroliner; 280 miles (450 km)

Dimensions
- Length: 10.57 metres (34.7 ft) to 11.5 metres (37.7 ft)
- Width: 2.52 metres (8.27 ft)
- Height: 4.40 metres (14.4 ft)
- Curb weight: 10.7 tonnes

Chronology
- Predecessor: Wright Gemini 2

The Wright StreetDeck is an integral double-decker bus manufactured by Wrightbus since 2014, originally delivered as standard with a Daimler OM934 diesel engine. Hybrid-electric, battery-electric and hydrogen-powered variants have subsequently been produced. Production of the StreetDeck range was briefly suspended when Wrightbus entered administration in September 2019.

== First generation (2015-2026) ==
=== StreetDeck Ultroliner / Micro Hybrid ===
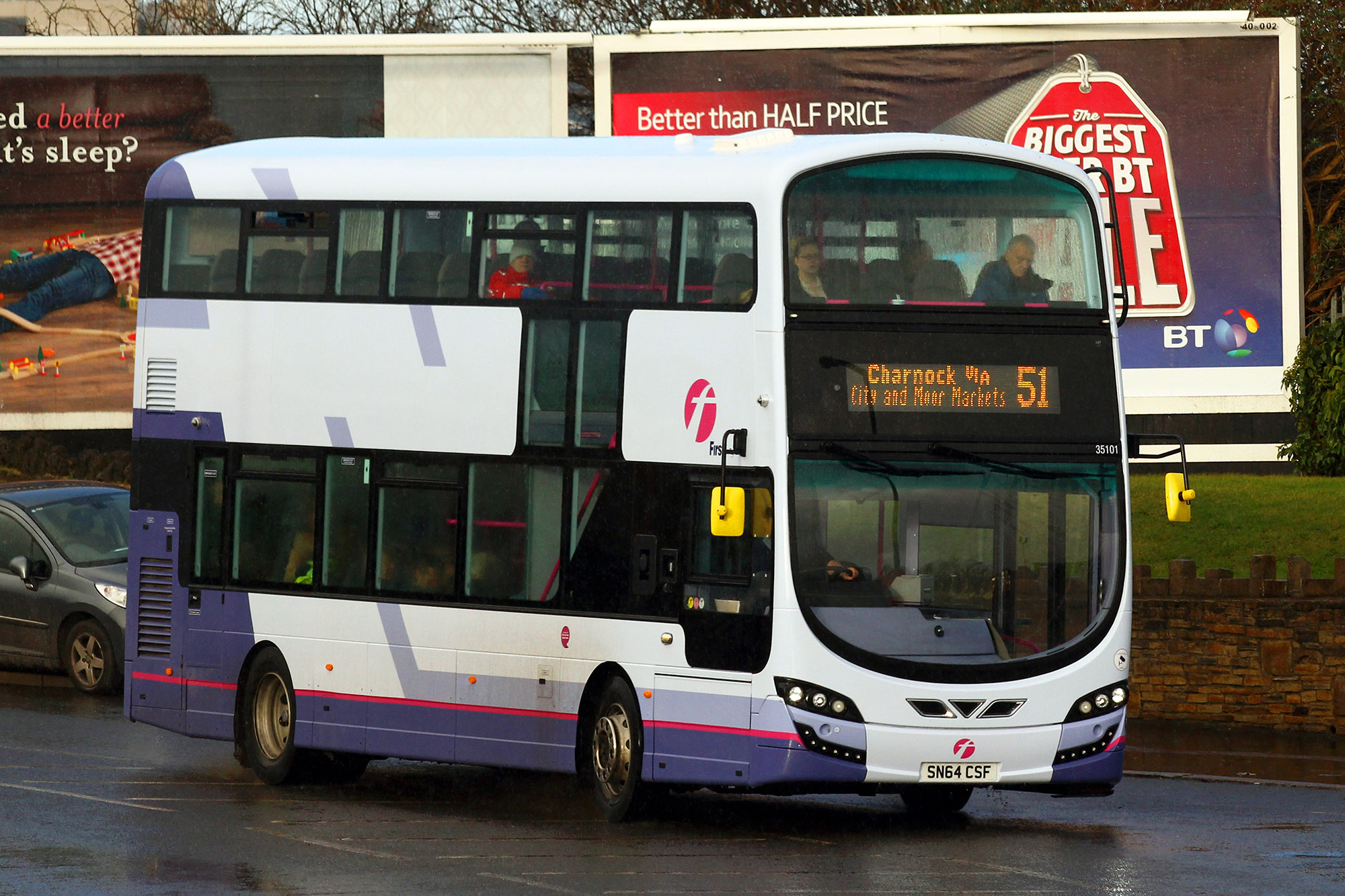
First South Yorkshire's demonstrator Wright StreetDeck in January 2015, showing the original-style front end fitted to the prototype vehicles

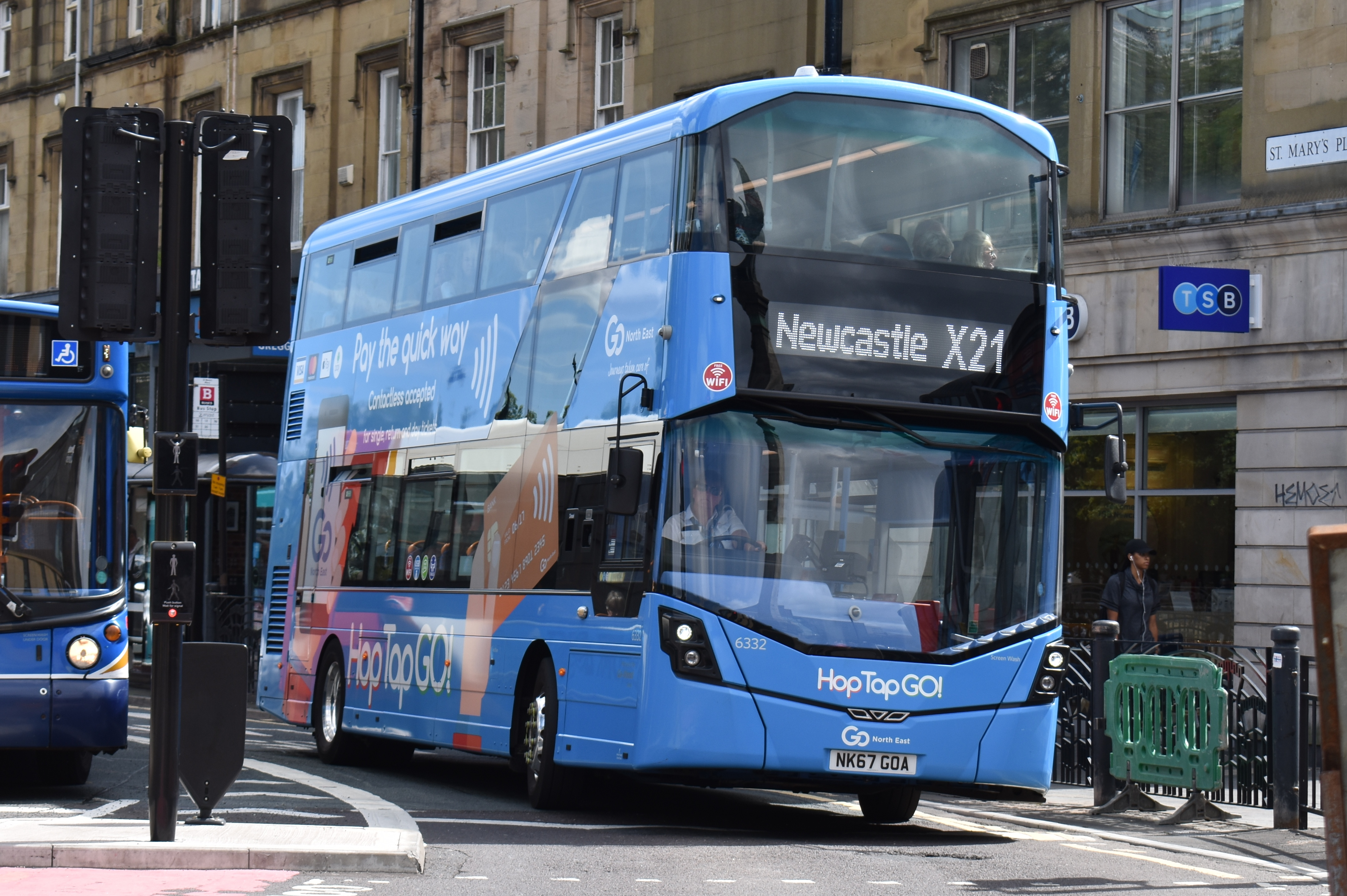
Go North East Wright StreetDeck in Newcastle-upon-Tyne in August 2018, showing the 'Stealth' front end fitted to production vehicles

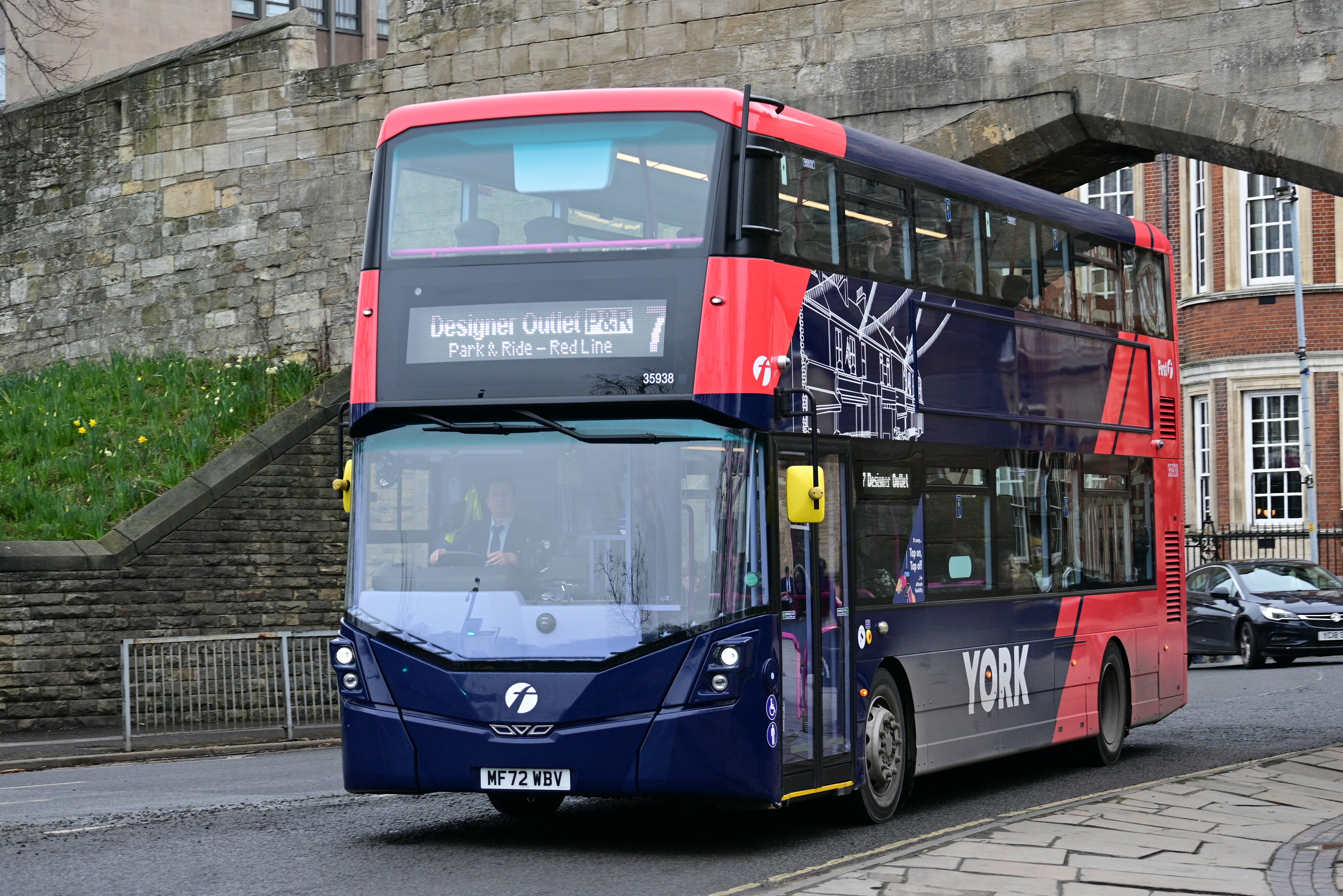
First York Wright StreetDeck Ultroliner in York in March 2023, showing the low-height roof option

The Wright StreetDeck was originally launched as a standard diesel integral bus fitted with a Daimler OM934 5.1 litre, 4-cylinder Euro 6 diesel engine, competing mainly with the Volvo B5TL and Alexander Dennis Enviro400 MMC. This StreetDeck variant was retrospectively renamed to the Streetdeck Ultroliner in 2021 to distinguish it from the later HEV, Electroliner and Hydroliner variants.

The StreetDeck is also available with the same Wrightbus 'Micro Hybrid' technology as was first provided in the StreetLite single-decker. The Micro Hybrid package consists of a flywheel and regenerative braking in the bus, which provides electricity used to power the interior lights and compressed air systems, saving up to 10% in fuel costs compared to the standard diesel StreetDeck.

The first five prototype StreetDeck demonstrators to be produced, three of which were delivered to First Greater Manchester, First South Yorkshire and Transdev Blazefield, were fitted with a front end similar in appearance to the outgoing Wright Eclipse Gemini 2 double-decker before Wrightbus's new standard 'Stealth' front Wright Eclipse Gemini 3 end styling was adopted for production examples. An additional two prototype StreetDeck demonstrators were built to Transport for London specification and delivered to Arriva London and London Central; Arriva London would later become the only TfL operator of diesel StreetDecks, taking delivery of a further ten production examples with restyled bodywork in July 2016 for service on route 340.

The first prototype StreetDeck featuring the new 'Stealth' bodywork entered service with Arriva Derby in November 2014, built to the operator's Sapphire specification for service on service 38, operating between Derby and Sinfin. Production examples soon followed, with the first order for 25 11.5-metre long-wheelbase StreetDecks delivered in March and April 2015 to Brighton & Hove for use on the operator's Coaster service between Brighton and Eastbourne. Further dual-door 10.57-metre standard-length StreetDecks in standard fleet livery were delivered in 2016 and 2017, taking Brighton & Hove's StreetDeck fleet to a total of 82 buses. Another early customer for the StreetDeck were Reading Buses, who took delivery of six StreetDeck Micro Hybrids equipped with stop-start technology in September 2016 for use on services connecting Reading and Woodley.

FirstGroup were initially the largest customer for the diesel StreetDeck following its launch, with an initial delivery of five entering service with First Leicester in 2015, followed by an additional 29 being delivered in 2016. Twenty-two entered service on First South Yorkshire's flagship X1 Steel Link service in September 2016, having entered service on route X78 from Sheffield to Doncaster in November 2015 due to delays in the opening of the Bus Rapid Transit North, while over 120 StreetDecks were delivered to First West Yorkshire's LeedsCity operation from 2018 onwards. First West of England received a total of 27 Wright StreetDecks between 2015 and 2016 for services in and around Bristol, and group subsidiary Somerset Passenger Solutions, providing worker shuttle services to the Hinkley Point C nuclear power station construction site, took delivery of 35 StreetDecks in late 2018 and early 2019, later taking delivery of 15 further StreetDeck Ultroliners in June 2023.

The diesel StreetDeck proved again popular across the FirstGroup following Wrightbus' rescue from bankruptcy in 2019, with significant orders for the StreetDeck Ultroliner from the group being delivered throughout 2022. StreetDeck Ultroliners were delivered to First Bradford bearing 'City of Bradford' branding in March 2022; First West of England, where 27 StreetDeck Ultroliners with revived Badgerline branding were delivered April 2022; First Eastern Counties, where 15 low-height StreetDecks began to be delivered for the Ipswich Reds operation from October 2022; First York, which took 20 for city and University of York services, and First Potteries, where 12 of the type, 10 branded for the 'Constellation' serving Keele University, were delivered in December 2022.

The Go-Ahead Group were the second largest customer for the diesel StreetDeck, with initial deliveries to the group going to the Oxford Bus Company, who took delivery of 41 StreetDecks between 2015 and 2017 for its city 3 (yellow), city 5 (pink), city 8&9 (orange) and Oxford park & ride services. Go North East purchased 26 StreetDecks for its Castles Express X21 and the Angel 21 services between 2016 and 2018. The company announced a further order of 31 StreetDecks for its X-Lines network of express routes in 2019 which were scheduled to enter service from Spring 2020; the delivery of these buses was delayed into the late summer due to the COVID-19 pandemic shutting down bus manufacturing, with the decision taken to divert six StreetDecks from the Go North East order to Thames Travel and a further three to the Oxford Bus Company. Of the remaining StreetDecks delivered to Go North East, the order included the first StreetDeck in the UK to feature Daimler's 6-cylinder engine, ten of which were later purchased by Bus Vannin for service on the Isle of Man.

Prior to Wrightbus entering administration, after Arriva UK Bus had taken delivery of a single demonstrator example in 2016 for use by Arriva Southern Counties, Arriva Yorkshire ordered several low-height StreetDecks in September 2019 that were built to Arriva Sapphire specification. Arriva cancelled seven of this batch following the period of administration, and a year later, these seven buses were sold to Ensignbus. The company later bought 14 new StreetDecks built to full-height Ensignbus specification. Arriva Merseyside took delivery of 24 low-height Streetdeck Ultroliners in January 2022, which entered service on two routes serving Liverpool and other surrounding areas.

Another significant operator of StreetDecks is the Rotala Group, who initially purchased 13 StreetDecks from a cancelled First Leeds order for Diamond North West in 2020. The group then ordered 139 more StreetDecks in 2020, with the majority being delivered to Diamond North West to replace vehicles leased from First Greater Manchester. The remaining four from this order were delivered to Preston Bus.

Translink in Northern Ireland first took delivery of 28 diesel StreetDecks between July and August 2018 for Ulsterbus services. These buses were branded as 'Urby' buses, operating on park and ride services as well as routes connecting Belfast with outlying communities mainly in County Antrim and County Down. An additional 10 Urby StreetDecks entered service on Belfast-County Down services in October 2019, while 20 StreetDecks entered service with Metro in Belfast in the same year, these being the final diesel buses to enter service with the operator. A further 70 StreetDecks were delivered to Ulsterbus between late 2020 and early 2021.

=== StreetDeck HEV ===
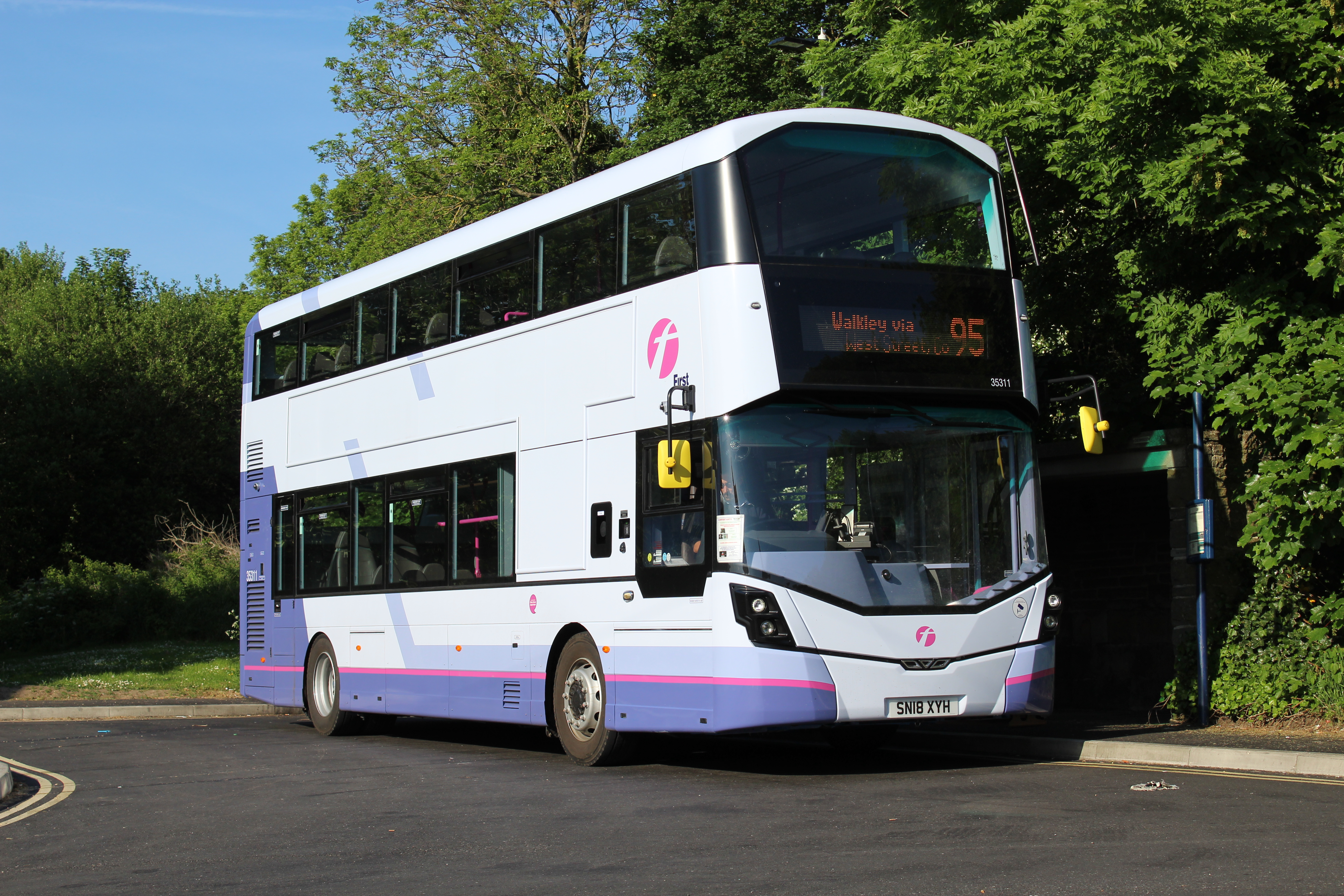
First South Yorkshire Wright StreetDeck HEV on its first day in service in May 2018

The hybrid-electric (HEV) variant of the StreetDeck was launched in 2018 alongside the hybrid-electric Wright StreetLite Max, with the first 13 StreetDeck HEVs entering service with First South Yorkshire alongside an order of StreetLites at the Olive Grove Depot in May 2018. Later that month, eight StreetDeck HEVs also entered service on First West Yorkshire's Elland Road park & ride service in Leeds.

Outside of the FirstGroup, the Oxford Bus Company took delivery of six StreetDeck HEVs in 2018 for Brookesbus services U1 and U5. A StreetDeck HEV was delivered to the Belfast Metro, while in London, StreetDeck HEVs were delivered to Tower Transit and Go-Ahead London, while a single demonstrator example delivered to London United was later purchased by Ensignbus for use as a prop vehicle in film and TV production.

=== StreetDeck Hydroliner ===
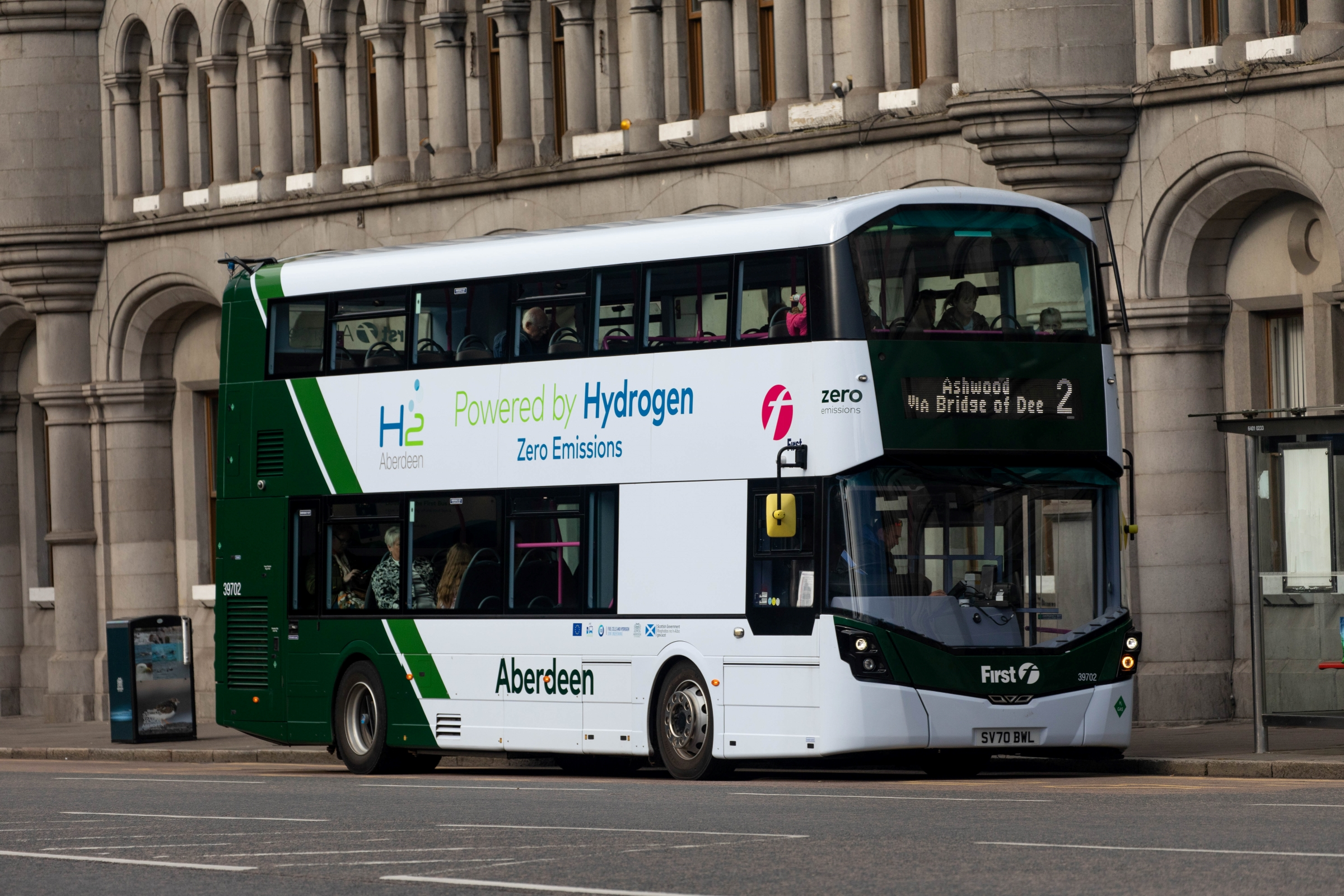
First Aberdeen Wright StreetDeck Hydroliner on Union Street, Aberdeen in September 2022

The hydrogen fuel cell (FCEV) variant of the StreetDeck, later named the StreetDeck Hydroliner in June 2021, was unveiled at the Euro Bus Expo in October 2018. When launched, it was the first hydrogen-powered double-decker bus the world, built with a range of up to 280 miles, using a fuel cell system made by Ballard with a Siemens drivetrain. Orders were placed in May 2019 by Transport for London for 20 of these to enter service in 2020, however these orders were interrupted due to the temporary collapse of Wrightbus when it fell into administration in the same year. These were eventually delivered to Metroline and entered service on route 7 in May 2021.

Further orders were first made by First Aberdeen for 15 StreetDeck Hydroliners in March 2020, which entered service in January 2021, while National Express West Midlands ordered 20 buses in October 2020, which were delivered throughout 2021 and entered service in the December of that year. Three more of the type entered service with Translink in Northern Ireland in December 2020; a further 23 were ordered in December 2021 and began to enter service from March 2022. Go-Ahead Group operator Metrobus have ordered 11 StreetDeck Hydroliners for delivery in late 2024. Four StreetDeck Hydroliners were ordered in October 2023 for long-term trial use from early 2024 on shuttle services transporting construction workers to the site of the Sizewell C nuclear power station in Suffolk, part of pilot research into the use of hydrogen-powered equipment on construction sites.

=== StreetDeck Electroliner ===
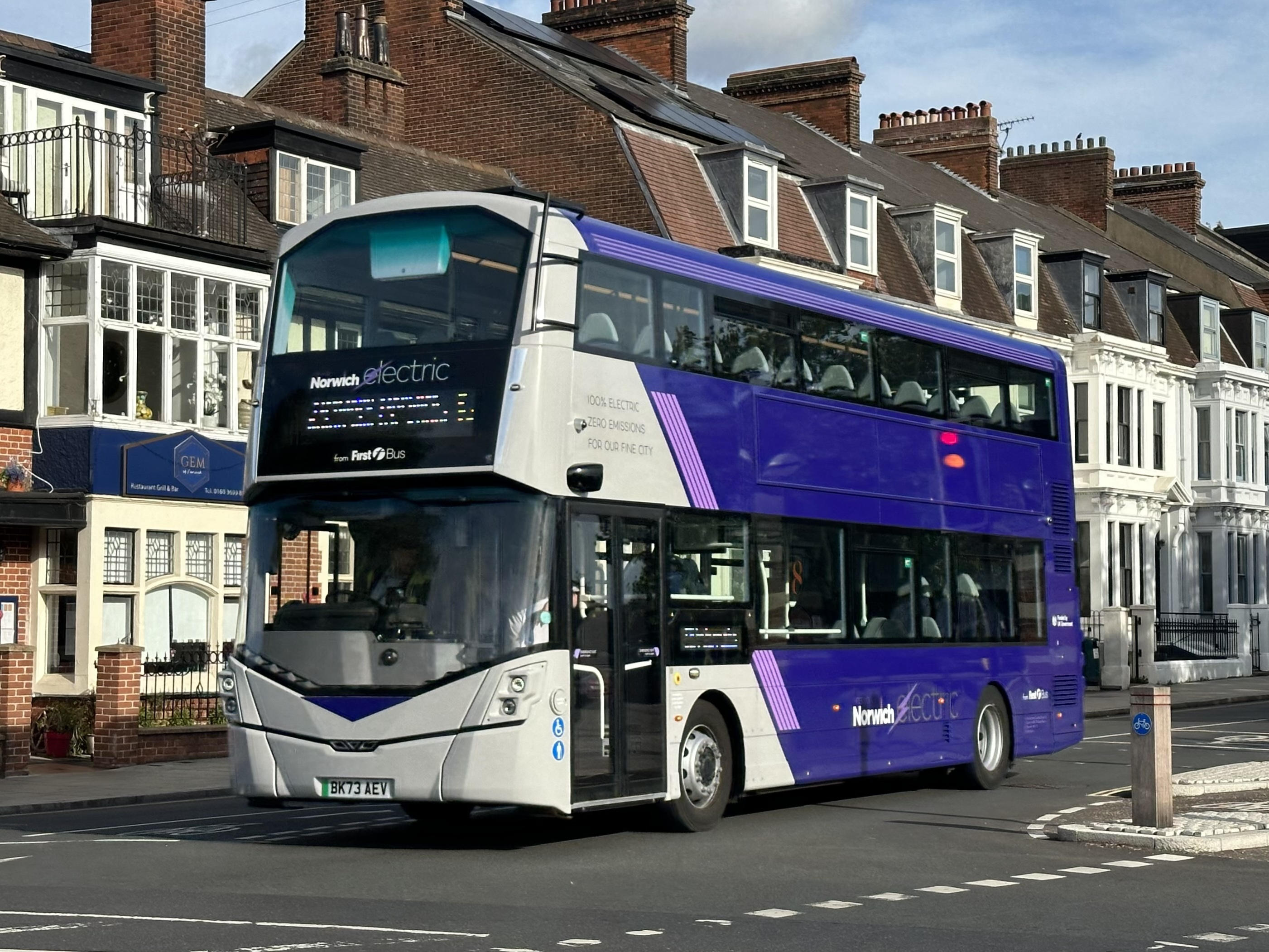
First Eastern Counties Wright StreetDeck Electroliner in Norwich in October 2023

The battery electric (BEV) variant of the StreetDeck, named the StreetDeck Electroliner, was launched at the ITT Hub conference in Farnborough, Hampshire in June 2021, built with a range of up to 200 miles and a battery capacity of 454 kWh. In 2022, Wrightbus claimed that the Electroliner had been certified as the most efficient battery electric double decker bus in the world following tests at the French automotive testing centre Utac. Batteries are supplied by French battery company Forsee Power, and are distributed around the chassis underneath the lower deck.

Before being rebranded to Transport UK London Bus, Abellio London was the largest Transport for London contractor to operate StreetDeck Electroliners, first taking delivery of 30 as Abellio London in February 2023 for service on route 111 and temporarily on route U5. A further nine were delivered for service on route C3 commencing in October 2023.

Elsewhere in London, Arriva London first ordered 16 StreetDeck Electroliners for use on route 307 in October 2022, later increasing this order to 50 buses in April 2023, followed by additional orders for 34 in October 2023 for route 279 and 76 for various routes in February 2024. Stagecoach London ordered 48 StreetDeck Electroliners in April 2023, later ordering an additional 16 in February 2024, and Metroline, after taking delivery of a single demonstrator example, took delivery of 39 StreetDeck Electroliners for use on routes 142 and 297 in August 2023.

Translink in Northern Ireland ordered 80 StreetDeck Electroliners as part of a £74 million zero-emissions fleet investment in 2021. The first of these entered service in Belfast with Metro in March 2022, and an additional 10 Electroliners were delivered for the Foyle Metro in Derry in May 2023. 79 more Electroliners began to be delivered to both Metro and Ulsterbus from May 2024 onwards, with one being delivered to the Foyle Metro operation, 21 being delivered for Ulsterbus services in Derry, Coleraine and Craigavon, and the remaining 57 due to be delivered to Metro by 2025.

The FirstGroup took delivery of its first Wright StreetDeck Electroliners in August 2023, with 20 entering service with First York, followed by the first of a further 55 StreetDeck Electroliners entering service in Norwich with First Eastern Counties in October 2023, and a further nine for First York's University of York services in late 2023. 25 StreetDeck Electroliners were delivered to First West Yorkshire's Bramley depot from March 2024 for service in Leeds, and 24 StreetDeck Electroliners were delivered to First Aberdeen in April 2025, alongside a separate order for eleven StreetDeck Electroliners by First Glasgow for use on the Glasgow Airport express bus service.

Arriva Midlands ordered 24 low-height specification StreetDeck Electroliners for service in Leicester, the first of which was delivered in September 2023, with the remaining buses delivered in early 2024. The Oxford Bus Company took delivery of 21 StreetDeck Electroliners in November 2023 for use on BROOKESbus services 100 & 400, the first of an order 91 StreetDeck Electroliners made in January 2023, with the remainder launched to begin entering service from January 2024.

Glasgow City Sightseeing operator West Coast Motors ordered 10 open top dual-door StreetDeck Electroliners, the first zero emissions buses globally for a City Sightseeing operation, which began to be delivered from February 2024. The Oxford Bus Company also took delivery of eight open top StreetDeck Electroliners for its City Sightseeing services in March 2024.

== Second generation (2023-present) ==
=== StreetDeck Electroliner Gen 2.0 ===
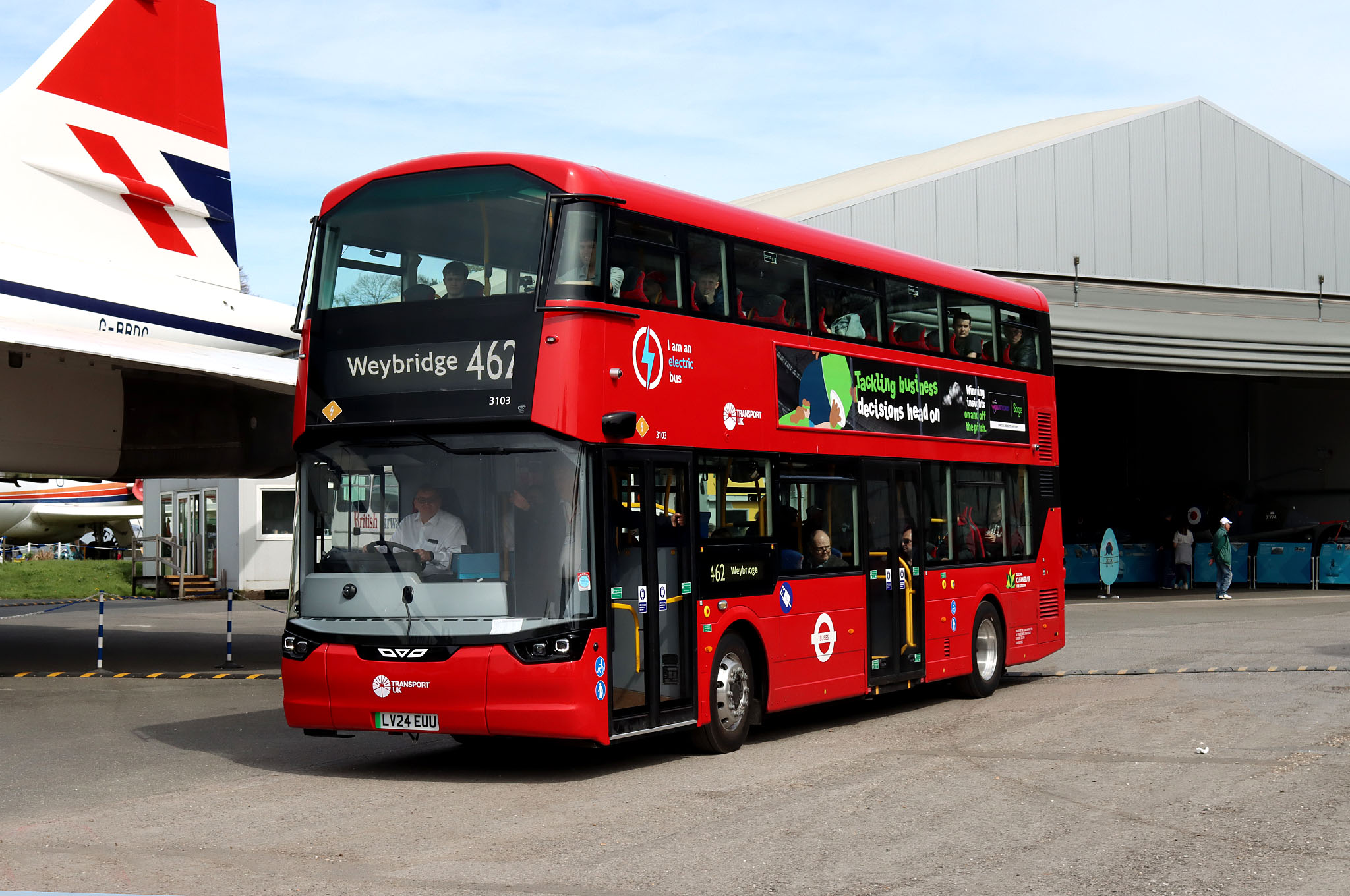
Transport UK London Bus Wright StreetDeck Electroliner with facelifted front fascia at the London Bus Museum, April 2024

From 2023, a facelifted version of the StreetDeck was introduced, with the front fascia and windscreen area of the bus entirely redesigned to a more rounded appearance. A similar redesigned fascia also introduced on Wright GB Kite Electroliners ordered by Abellio London, with both Wrightbus models receiving these modifications to comply with the Transport for London Bus Safety Standard. By July 2025, a tri-axle variant of the StreetDeck Electroliner was in development for export markets in Continental Europe, Asia and Ocenaia, with production of tri-axle models underway in both Wrightbus' Ballymena factory and another factory in Malaysia.

Wrightbus announced the launch of a second-generation Electroliner driveline in November 2025, which primarily saw Forsee Power's NMC batteries replaced with slimmer 442 kWh lithium iron phosphate (LFP) batteries manufactured by CATL, extending the StreetDeck Electroliner's range up to 275 miles (443 km) and additionally allowing for a lower floor height. Other upgrades for the StreetDeck Electroliner include a 75-minute 380kW 'rapid charging' time compared to the previous three hours, a new Voith Electrical Drive System and a new Grayson Thermal Systems HVAC system compliant with TfL standards.

Of the 91 StreetDeck Electroliners delivered to the Oxford Bus Company between late 2023 and early 2024, 62 were facelifted models branded for use on the Oxford SmartZone enhanced partnership. StreetDeck Electroliners delivered to Abellio London's successor, Transport UK London Bus, from early 2024 were also delivered with the facelifted front fascia, the first such examples to enter service in London.

Go North West took delivery of 19 facelift StreetDeck Electroliners for Bee Network franchised bus services in the Metropolitan Borough of Bury in late 2024, with a further 58 due to be delivered to Go North West during 2026 for services in the Metropolitan Borough of Bolton, 43 of which will be specified as guided buses to replace older hybrid buses on the Leigh-Salford-Manchester Bus Rapid Transit system. A further 55 were ordered by Transport for Greater Manchester in March 2026, followed by 119 more for Metroline Manchester and Stagecoach Manchester that were ordered in May 2026.

The Liverpool City Region Combined Authority is to take delivery of over 100 StreetDeck Electroliners for distribution to Stagecoach Merseyside and South Lancashire and Go North West, whose franchised Metro operations in the region will start in October 2026. The first two buses from this order arrived in the region in February 2026 for driver training usage. StreetDeck Electroliners are also among an order for 193 Wrightbus electric buses placed in May 2026 by the West Yorkshire Combined Authority for use on franchised Weaver Network services, with the first completed for delivery to the Combined Authority in October 2026.

In October 2024, the Go-Ahead Group signed a £500 million three-year deal for Wrightbus to supply of over 1,200 electric buses to its subsidiaries; all apart from 43 of these buses will be from the Electroliner range. The first Go-Ahead operator to take delivery of vehicles from this deal was Plymouth Citybus, who began taking delivery of 50 StreetDeck Electroliners in May 2025, with Go North East following in late 2025 with 25 StreetDeck Electroliners for use on the Angel 21 and the 'Voltra' branded 58 service between Newcastle upon Tyne and Heworth. Southern Vectis began taking delivery of 31 StreetDeck Electroliners from February 2026 onwards, seven were delivered to Pulhams Coaches in March 2026, 18 were launched by Salisbury Reds and 16 were launched by East Yorkshire in March 2026, and another 16 were launched into service by Brighton & Hove in April 2026.

Following its order for six StreetDeck Ultroliners with capability for conversion to battery-electric drivetrains, Nottingham City Transport took delivery of six StreetDeck Electroliners as part of its first batch of battery-electric double-deckers in October 2026. Following the group's large orders for the first generation Electroliner, First Bus East of England took delivery of the FirstGroup's first 14 Gen 2.0 Electroliners in October 2026.

=== StreetDeck Hydroliner Gen 2.0 ===
Following a four-year development programme part funded by the Advanced Propulsion Centre and involving companies Grayson Thermal Systems, Queen's University Belfast, HYGEN and Translink, Wrightbus announced the launch of a second-generation StreetDeck Hydroliner in February 2025. The Hydroliner Gen 2.0, built with the facelifted front fascia, is to be more cost-efficient for operators compared to the original, and is set to have an increased passenger-carrying capacity through the introduction of a new Ballard fuel cell.

=== StreetDeck Ultroliner ===
Nottingham City Transport second-generation StreetDeck Ultroliner in June 2026

In November 2024, it was announced that StreetDeck Ultroliner diesels, which began to be produced that year with the facelifted front fascia, could also be specified with Cummins 6.7 ISB 6-cylinder engines. Bus Vannin was the first operator to order StreetDeck Ultroliners specified with the new Cummins engines, taking delivery of six between October and November 2025, two of which were delivered in heritage liveries commemorating 50 years of nationalised bus transport on the Isle of Man.

Metroline Manchester was an early major customer for the facelift StreetDeck Ultroliner as part of the rollout of its Tranche 3 Bee Network services, with a total of 135, most of which were ordered by Transport for Greater Manchester, delivered and stored until the commencement of services on 5 January 2025. Stagecoach Manchester, meanwhile, also took delivery of eight StreetDeck Ultroliners built to the same Bee Network specification for use exclusively on route 330, running between Stockport and Ashton-under-Lyne interchanges.

Due to battery electric vehicles not being a viable option to run on the service, Nottingham City Transport took delivery of six StreetDeck Ultroliners in March 2026, the operator's first Wrightbus order since 2002, for use on its Pathfinder 26 service, running between Nottingham city centre and Southwell.

Transport for Wales took delivery of 14 StreetDeck Ultroliners for its TrawsCymru services in during June 2026, distributing eight to Arriva Cymru and the remaining six to independent operator Lloyds Coaches of Machynlleth. Arriva Cymru took delivery of a further 33 StreetDeck Ultroliners in November 2026, with most branded for the 'Cymru Coastliner' express service between Llandudno, Colwyn Bay, Rhyl, and Chester.

== Exports ==
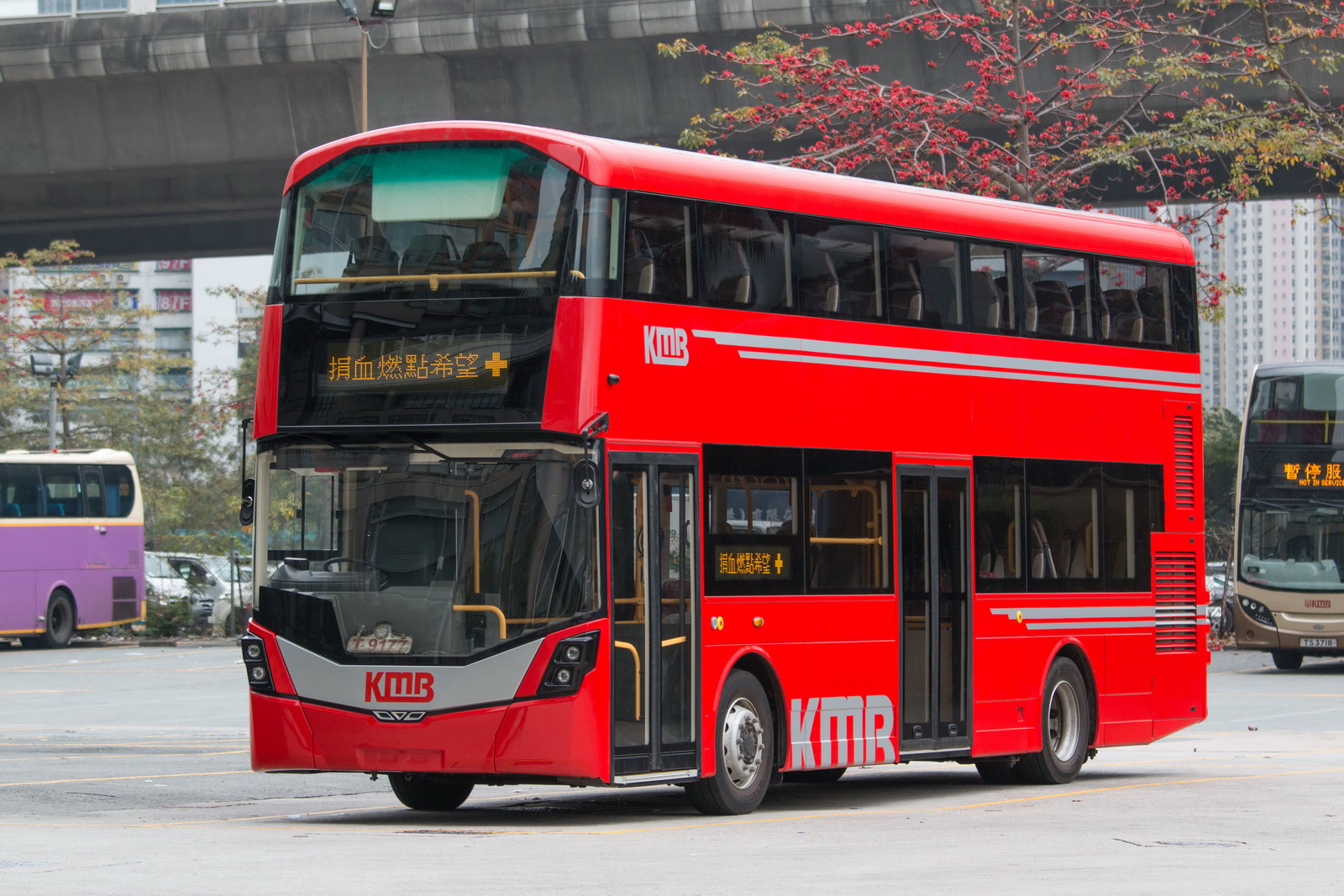
The Kowloon Motor Bus Wright StreetDeck demonstrator in Hong Kong in March 2018

In 2018, a diesel StreetDeck demonstrator equipped with Daimler OM936LA 295 hp engine was exported to Hong Kong and placed in service with Kowloon Motor Bus in September 2019. The demonstrator was only operated in service for two weeks by KMB due to Wrightbus falling into administration, and the bus was sent back to the United Kingdom in February 2020, later entering service with Ensignbus after extensive modifications for use by the operator on private hire services. Five StreetDecks built to KMB specification were later delivered to company subsidiary SunBus in March 2021.

Five StreetDecks were exported to Monterrey, Mexico in 2017. Although Mexico drives on the right, they were built as right-hand drive vehicles to operate on the Ecovía bus rapid transit corridor, in which passengers board from the left-hand side of the road. These were laid up out of service in 2019 due to damage from being fuelled with inadequate fuel mixtures. A left-hand drive StreetDeck demonstrator later entered service in Santiago, Chile in March 2019.

The National Transport Authority of Ireland plans to place 800 StreetDeck Electroliners into service across Ireland between 2023 and 2028 as part of a single-supplier agreement with Wrightbus. Around 100 Electroliners began to be delivered to Dublin Bus from late 2023 onwards, while 34 entered service with Bus Éireann in Limerick in April 2024; a further 21 have been ordered by Bus Éireann for delivery to the city in early 2025.

In 2025, a tri-axle version of the second generation StreetDeck Electroliner was produced for markets in the Asia-Pacific, such as Hong Kong, Singapore and Australia. One demonstrator unit will be shipped to an unnamed Hong Kong operator for a one-year trial. An order for 20 tri-axle second-generation StreetDeck Electroliners, which will be assembled in Wrightbus' Malaysian manufacturing facility, was subsequently announced by Citybus of Hong Kong in May 2026, with delivery expected in 2027.

== See also ==
- Wright Eclipse Gemini
- List of buses
