= Wright GB Kite =

Zero emissions single-decker bus range

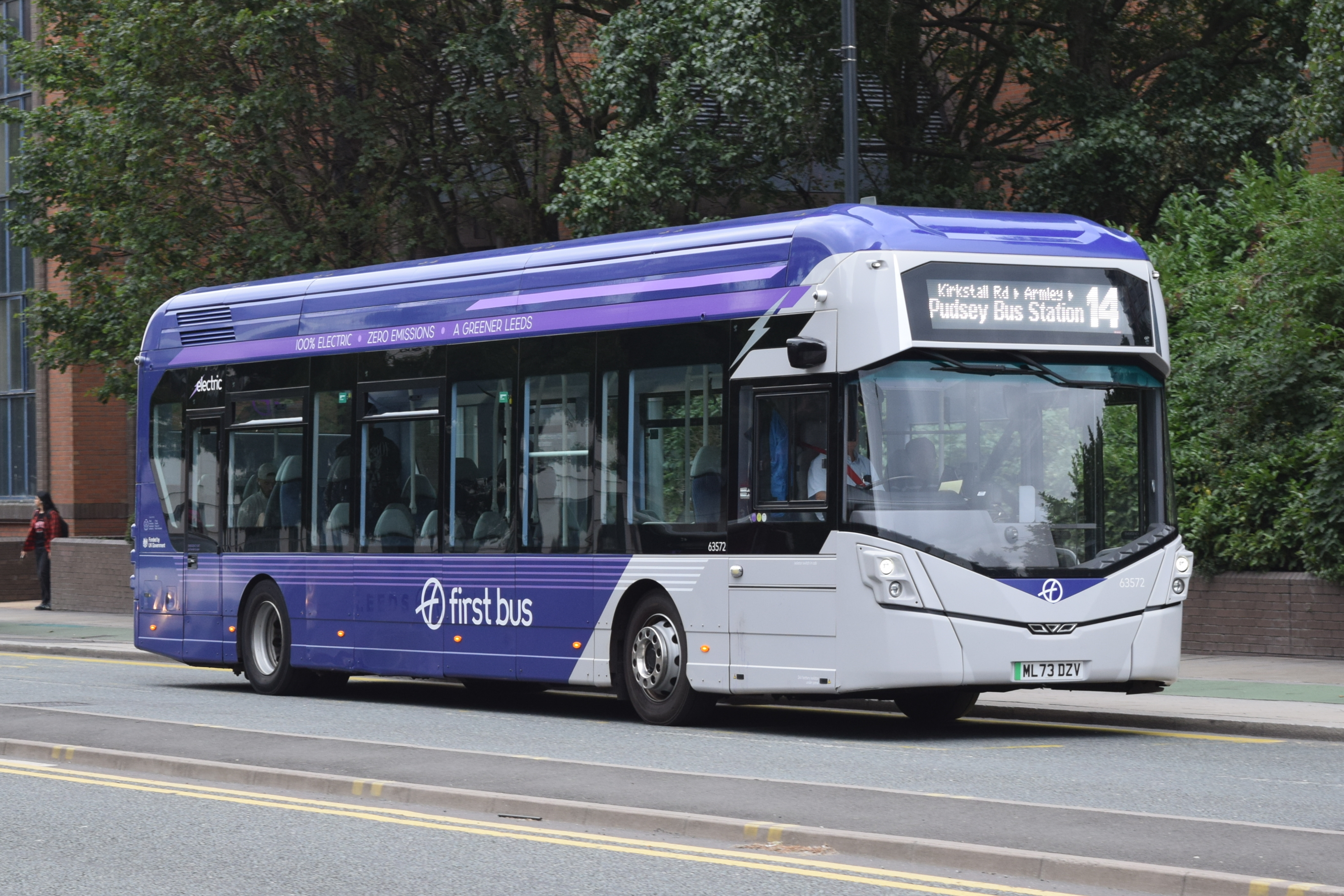
- First West Yorkshire Wright GB Kite Electroliner in Leeds in August 2025

Overview
- Manufacturer: Wrightbus
- Production: 2022–present
- Assembly: Ballymena, Northern Ireland

Body and chassis
- Class: Electric bus Fuel cell bus
- Doors: 1 or 2
- Floor type: Low floor
- Chassis: Integral
- Related: Wright GB Hawk; Wright StreetDeck

Powertrain
- Capacity: 90 maximum
- Battery: Electroliner; 340/454/567 kW Forsee Power NMC; 442/528 kWh CATL LFP; Hydroliner; 70/100 kW Ballard FCmove fuel cell 30/45 kW reserve
- Range: Electroliner; 250 miles (400 km) (Forsee Power); 300–375 miles (483–604 km) (CATL); Hydroliner; 640 miles (1,030 km)

Dimensions
- Length: 10.9 metres (36 ft), 11.6 metres (38 ft), 12.5 metres (41 ft)
- Width: 2.5 metres (8.2 ft)
- Height: 3.3 metres (11 ft)

Chronology
- Predecessor: Wright Eclipse 3 Wright StreetAir; Wright StreetLite

The Wright GB Kite is a range of full-size zero-emission single-deck buses manufactured by Wrightbus since 2022. Similar in body style to the diesel powered Wright GB Hawk, the GB Kite is an integral design that can be built as a battery electric vehicle, the Electroliner, and as a fuel cell electric vehicle, the Hydroliner.

== Design ==
The GB Kite range was launched in September 2021, following the launch of the double-deck Wright StreetDeck Electroliner and Hydroliner range earlier in the year. The Electroliner has a maximum range of 250 miles (400 km) with the top option of a 567kwh battery, charged through conventional DC charging or pantograph charging. The Hydroliner has a maximum range of 640 miles (1,030 km), powered with either a 70 or 100kwh fuel cell system produced by Ballard Power Systems in combination with a 35 kg (77 lb) or 50 kg (110 lb) hydrogen tank. Regular production of both GB Kite variants was fully underway by December 2022.

Wrightbus announced the launch of a second-generation Electroliner driveline in November 2025, which primarily saw Forsee Power's NMC batteries replaced with slimmer 442 or 528 kWh lithium iron phosphate (LFP) batteries manufactured by CATL, extending the GB Kite Electroliner's range up to 300 miles (480 km) or 375 miles (604 km). Other upgrades for the GB Kite Electroliner include a 75-minute 380kW 'rapid charging' time compared to the previous three hours, a new Voith Electrical Drive System and a new Grayson Thermal Systems HVAC system compliant with Transport for London standards.

== Operators ==
=== Hydroliner ===
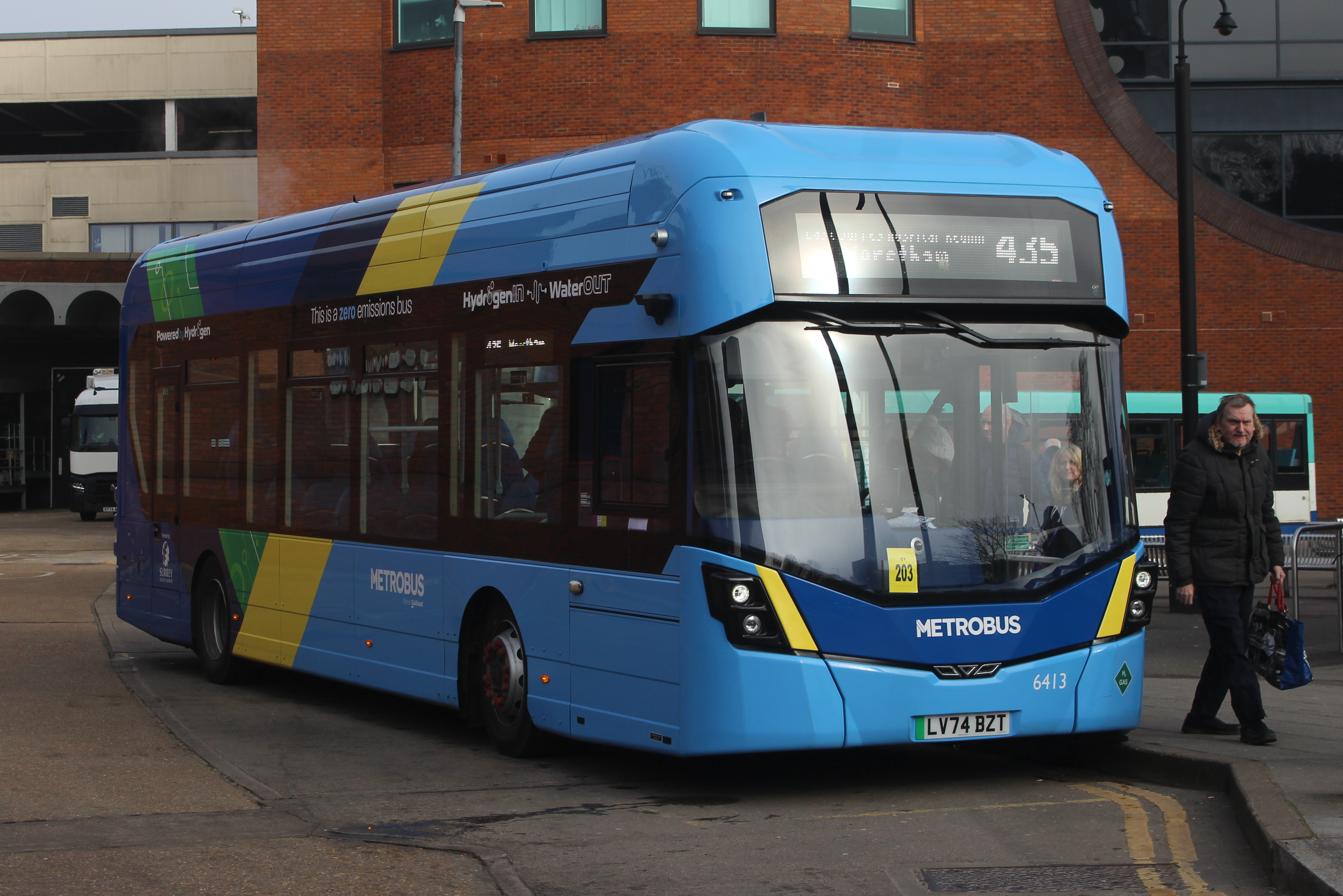
Metrobus Wright GB Kite Hydroliner in Crawley in March 2025

The first orders for GB Kites was placed in November 2021, with Metrobus ordering 20 Hydroliner vehicles for use on the Fastway network. The first buses from this order, also being the first production Hydroliners, began entering service with Metrobus on the Fastway network in April 2023, with the order for 20 completed later in June. By 2024, however, up to two thirds of the Fastway Hydroliner fleet were not being used in regular service due to the Health and Safety Executive not signing off on a liquid hydrogen fuelling system at Metrobus' Crawley depot. Despite this, a further order for 23 Kite Hydroliners is to be delivered in late 2024 for both Fastway and conventional Metrobus services in Surrey. In December 2025 Wrightbus asked Metrobus at Crawley to suspend operation of their entire Hydroliner fleet of 42 vehicles, following a fire in one bus on 2 December 2025.

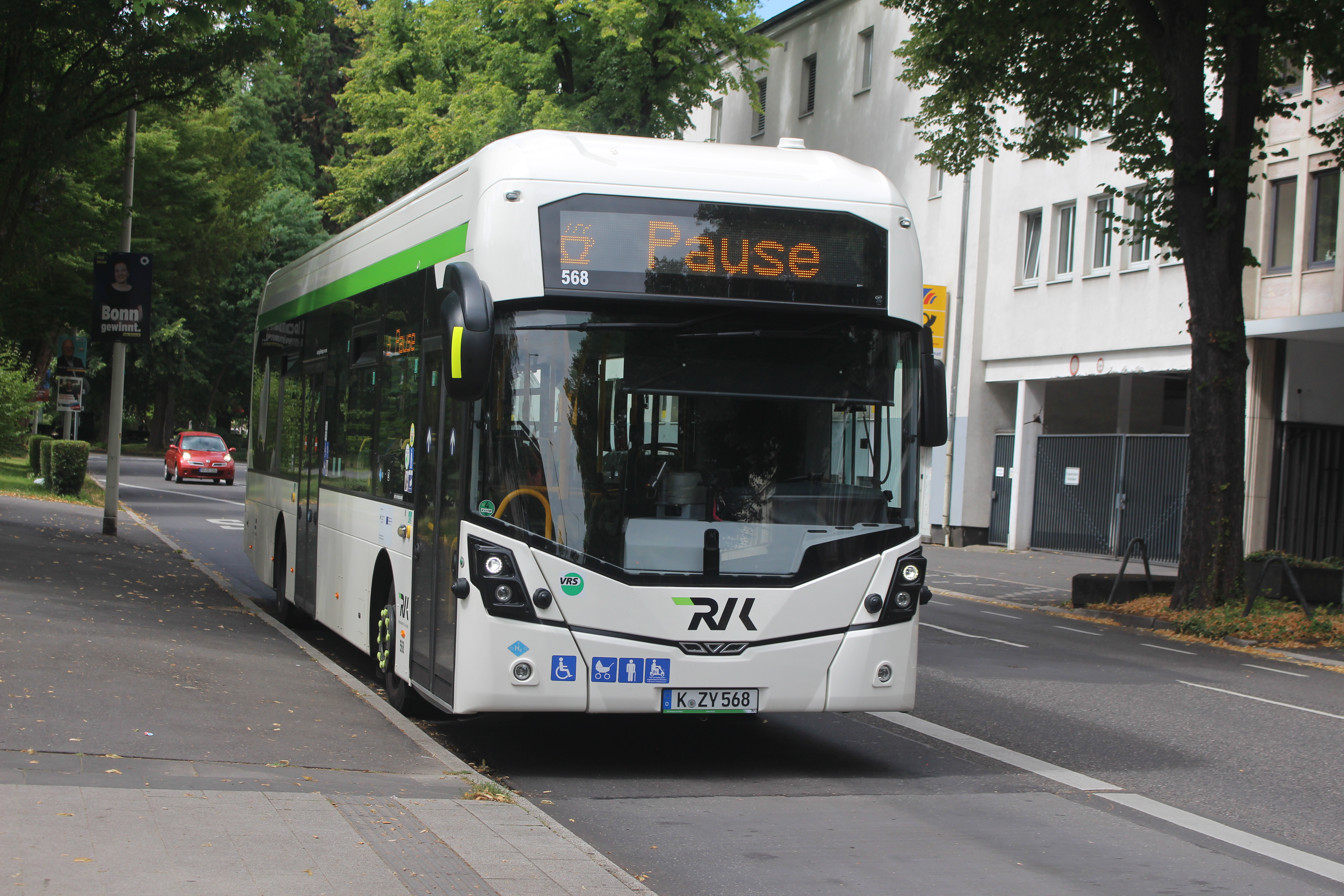
Regionalverkehr Köln Wright GB Kite Hydroliner in Cologne in July 2025

The GB Kite Hydroliner has proven most popular in Germany, with Wrightbus set to deliver up to 130 in left-hand drive configuration to German operators by the end of 2025. A first batch of 31 Hydroliners were delivered to Cologne municipal operator Regionalverkehr Köln during 2024, Wrightbus' first European order since the bus builder was rescued from bankruptcy, with an additional 29 due for delivery in 2025. Twelve were delivered to WestVerkehr in April 2025 for service in Geilenkirchen in North Rhine-Westphalia, while due for delivery during 2025 include an order for 28 Hydroliners placed in February 2024 by Saarbahn for service in Saarbrücken, 46 for Cottbus municipal Cottbusverkehr, and five for Vestische Straßenbahn in Herten.

In May 2022, Wrightbus entered a deal to supply the Australian bodybuilder Volgren with two GB Kite Hydroliner chassis for the company to body. These two buses are scheduled to enter service with Transdev Queensland for hydrogen fuel-cell trial services in Brisbane.

=== Electroliner ===
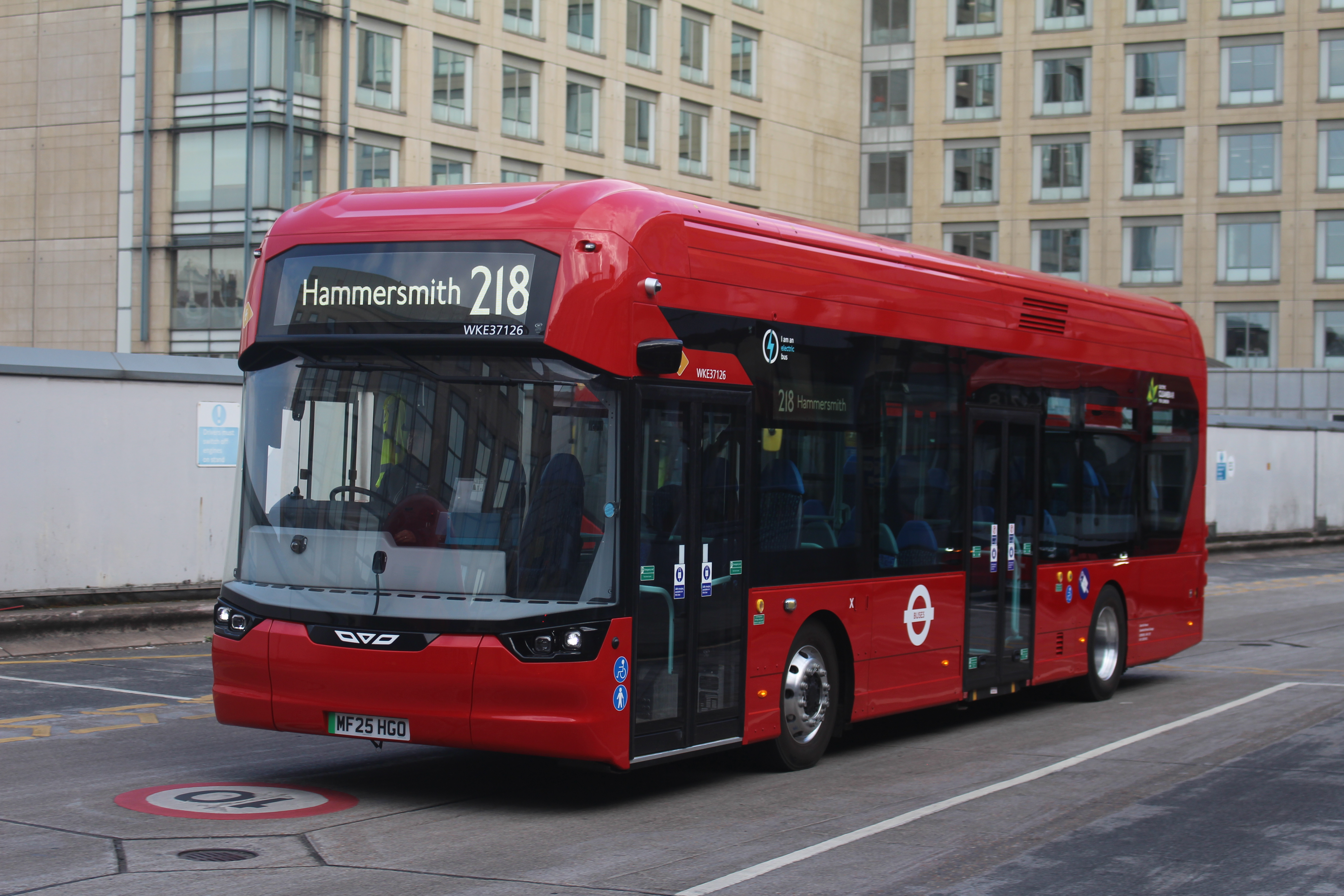
First Bus London Wright GB Kite Electroliner with facelifted front fascia at Hammersmith bus station in April 2025

The FirstGroup ordered 173 GB Kite Electroliners in August 2022 for five of the group's subsidiaries as part of an order which also included 20 StreetDeck Electroliners. The first buses from an initial order of 68 GB Kite Electroliners began entering service with First Leicester in May 2023, followed by deliveries of 24 GB Kite Electroliners to First York beginning in late August 2023, 32 to First West Yorkshire's Bramley depot between January and March 2024 for service in Leeds, and the first of 61 for First Hampshire & Dorset's Portsmouth services from March 2024. Further orders for GB Kite Electroliners have been made by First Eastern Counties for services in Norwich, while 18 more are also due for delivery to First Leicester in 2024.

28 GB Kite Electroliners were delivered for Translink's Foyle Metro operation in Derry in May 2023. These buses began entering service in the city in August 2023 after the installation of charging infrastructure and training of staff at the Foyle Metro depot. 21 more GB Kite Electroliners began to be delivered to Translink from May 2024, with four being delivered for the Foyle Metro operation, 14 being delivered to Ulsterbus for services in Derry, Coleraine and Craigavon, and three delivered Metro in Belfast for use on an express service to George Best Belfast City Airport.

The Oxford Bus Company received five GB Kite Electroliners as part of a 104-vehicle order for zero-emission Wrightbus buses, while Transport UK, the first Transport for London operator to order GB Kites, ordered 12 GB Kite Electroliners for service on route E7 featuring a redesigned front end to comply with TfL's Bus Safety Standard, with the first of a further 24 delivered to Abellio's successor Transport UK London Bus from May 2024. Arriva London, meanwhile, announced in February 2024 that it had placed orders for 11 GB Kite Electroliners.

In October 2024, the Go-Ahead Group signed a £500 million three-year deal for Wrightbus to supply of over 1,200 electric buses to its subsidiaries; all apart from 43 of these buses will be from the Electroliner range. The first Go-Ahead subsidiary to take delivery of GB Kite Electroliners from this deal was Pulhams Coaches, with eight entering service with the operator in March 2026, a further nine GB Kites entering service with Salisbury Reds in April 2026, and eleven entering service with East Yorkshire that same month.

Edinburgh municipal bus operator Lothian Buses took delivery of nine GB Kite Electroliners in June 2026. 16 GB Kite Electroliners ordered by Transport for Greater Manchester were delivered to Stagecoach Manchester in October 2026 for franchised Bee Network services, while GB Kite Electroliners are among an order for 193 Wrightbus electric buses also placed in May 2026 by the West Yorkshire Combined Authority for use on franchised Weaver Network services.
