= N56 =

N56 may refer to:

== Roads ==
- N56 road (Belgium)
- Route nationale 56, in France
- N56 road (Ireland)
- N56 highway (Philippines)
- Nebraska Highway 56, in the United States

== Other uses ==
- N-56 (pressure group) a Scottish pressure group
- Great Valley Airport, in Cattaraugus County, New York, United States
- HMS Grampus (N56), a Grampus-class submarine of the Royal Navy sunk in 1940
- HMS Union (N56), a U-class submarine of the Royal Navy sunk in 1941
- N56, the night operated service for the Cityrider 56
