= Andrei Bakich =

Lieutenant-General of the Army of the Russian Empire

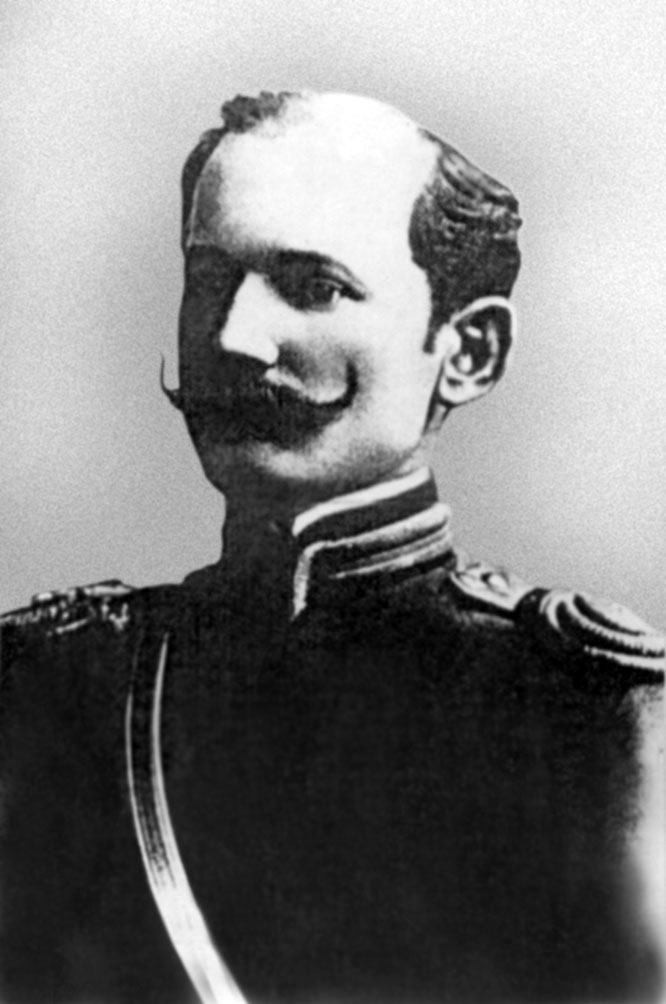
Andrei Stepanovich Bakich

Andrei Stepanovich Bakich (Russian: Андрей Степанович Бакич; 31 December 1878 – 17 June 1922) was a general of the White movement during the Russian Civil War.

Bakich rose to regimental command during World War I, and during the Russian Civil War, he was one of the leaders of the military arm of the Russian White movement, better known as the White Guard. The liquidation of his troops signified the breakdown of organized armed resistance to the Bolsheviks in 1922.

== Life in Serbia and Montenegro ==
Bakich was born on the last day of 1878 in Andrijevica in the then Principality of Montenegro, and in documents, he never failed to declare himself a Serb by nationality. He finished elementary school in his native town and completed his secondary school education at the Third Belgrade Gymnasium. After the assassination of King Milan Obrenović, Bakich decided to emigrate to Imperial Russia when rumors began to spread that he was involved in the plot.

== Russian officer ==
In 1900, Bakich entered the 60th Zamosc Infantry Regiment. Later in 1902, he graduated from the Odessa Military Academy. He was transferred to the Far East, where he served in the newly formed 8th Siberian Rifle Division. He participated in the Russo-Japanese War in 1905. From 1906 to 1910, he advanced from the rank of lieutenant to the rank of captain. In 1909 in Vladivostok, his son Mihailo Bakich, who later became an architect and engineer, was born. In 1913, owing to poor health, he resigned from the military and started working as a trader, with the Russian-Mongolian trade organization based in Mongolia.

== World War I ==
After the outbreak of the Great War, Bakich decided to rejoin the military and was mobilized into the national army, to be soon set up in the 56th Infantry Division in Siberia. At the beginning of the war, he showed great military capabilities, as reflected in his victories over the superior German army. On 30 May 1915, for heroism shown during Germany's use of chemical weapons attack he was awarded the Order of Saint George fourth degree. In 1915, Bakich was awarded also the Order of St. Anna 3rd degree, the Order of St. Stanislav, and followed by the Order of St. Vladimir 4th grade. For merit in the fight against the Germans at Gombin in Poland, he was awarded the coveted Golden Weapon "For Bravery".

In April 1916, he was transferred to the 63rd Siberian Rifle Regiment, where he was wounded in December of the same year. In January 1917 he was appointed Commander of the 55th Siberian Rifle Regiment, but after the February Revolution he was removed from his position.

== Civil War ==
In the spring of 1918, Bakich was head of the garrison of the city of Samara, and at the same time a member of the white-border military organization. After Samara was brought under the jurisdiction of the interim White government of Alexander Kolchak, Bakich joined the White Guards and became the head of the People's Army of the Syzran region, and on 24 July 1918 he became the commander of the 2nd Infantry Division of the People's Army of the Syzran region. At the same time, he also commanded the People's Army of the Buzuluk region.

From February 1919 to January 1920 he was the commander of the Orenburg Military Corps. In April 1919, he was promoted to the rank of Major General and was admitted to the Orenburg Cossacks.

At the end of the Civil War in 1920, Bakich was promoted to the rank of colonel general, and ordered to withdraw his army from Russia, then counting 10,000 men. He retreated to the Chinese province of Xinjiang, where, under the control of the Chinese authorities, he was forced to surrender most of their heavy artillery, and what remained was only sufficient for defense. Since it was obvious that the Red Army was winning the war, the Xinjiang authorities allowed the Bolshevik government to pursue and destroy Bakich's army in the Chinese territory. Bakich, with great losses, retreated towards Mongolia, where the Mongolian government declared him persona non grata. In Mongolia, he was captured by the "Mongolian Red Army" and brought before the Bolshevik government court, which at the end of May 1922 sentenced him to death by firing squad. Bakich and the other captured White officers were shot just after midnight, early on 17 June 1922.

== Awards and decorations ==
- Order of St. Stanislav, 3rd degree (1906-01-31).
- Order of St. Anne, 3rd degree with swords and bow (1915-05-19).
- Order of St. Stanislav, 2nd degree with swords (1915-05-19).
- Order of St. Vladimir of the 4th degree with swords and bow (1915-05-28).
- Georgievsk or Golden Weapon "For Bravery" (1915-06-12).
- Order of St. George, 4th degree (1916-08-29).
