= 56 =

56 may refer to:

- 56 (number), the natural number following 55 and preceding 57
- One of the years 56 BC, AD 56, 1956, 2056
- 56.com, a Chinese online video platform
- Fifty-Six, Arkansas, a city in the United States
- "Fifty Six", a song by Karma to Burn from the album Arch Stanton, 2014
- 56 Melete, a main-belt asteroid
- Isaiah 56, the fifty-sixth chapter of the Book of Isaiah in the Old Testament of the Christian Bible
- Cityrider 56, a bus route in Tyne and Wear, UK
- Chile's international calling code

== See also ==
- 56th (disambiguation)
