= Angel 21 =

Bus service in North East England

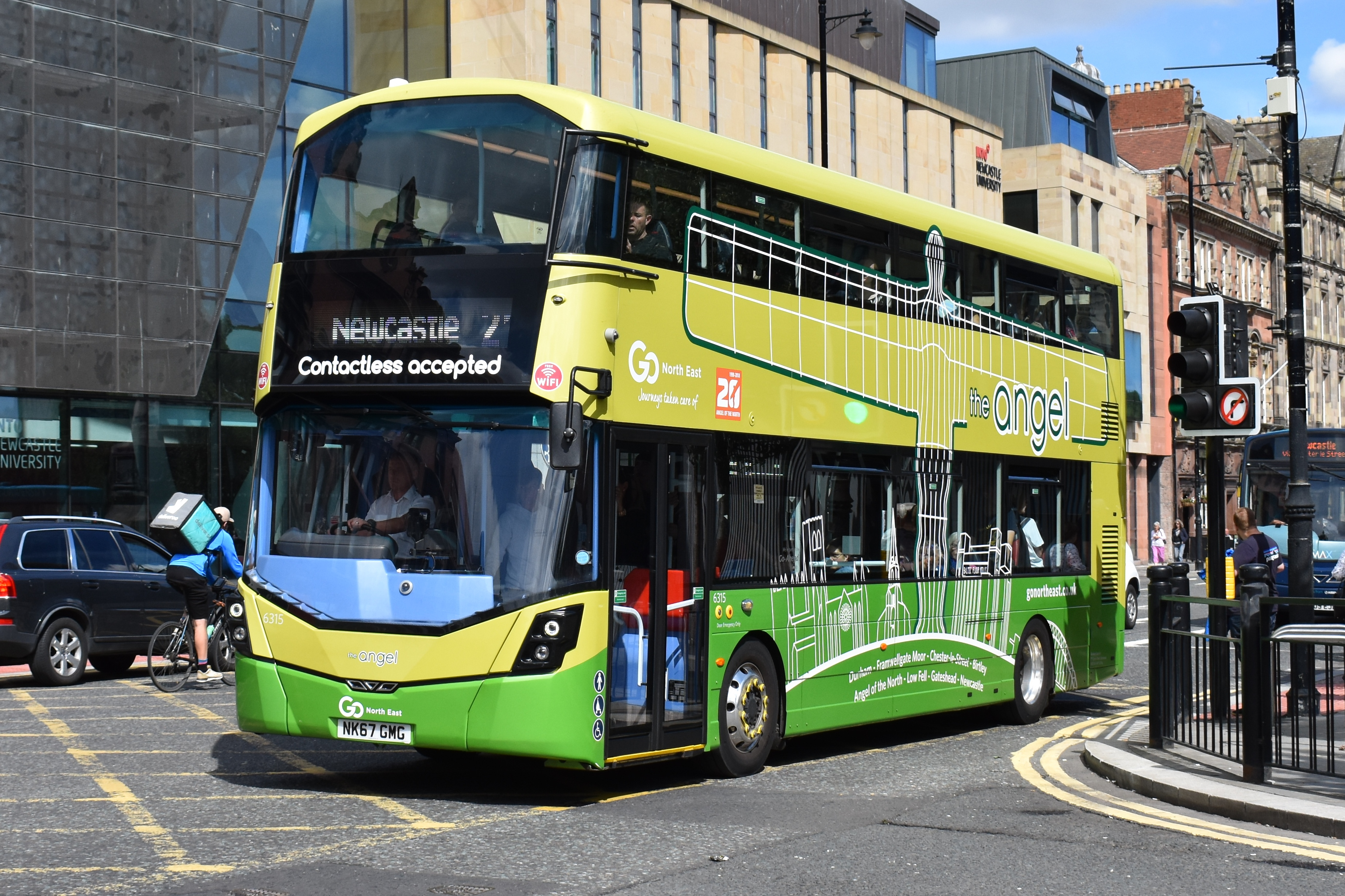
- Locale: County Durham; Tyne and Wear
- Service area: Brandon; Durham; Chester-le-Street; Birtley; Low Fell; Gateshead; Newcastle upon Tyne
- Service type: Bus service
- Fleet: Wright StreetDeck Electroliner
- Operator: Go North East
- Website: Go North East

The Angel 21 is a bus service operated by Go North East, which connects Newcastle upon Tyne, Gateshead, Low Fell and Birtley in Tyne and Wear with Chester-le-Street, Durham and Brandon in County Durham, England. The service is named after Antony Gormley's Angel of the North, which the route passes.

== History ==
In autumn 2012, a fleet of Euro 5 Volvo B5LH/Wright Eclipse Gemini 2 diesel-hybrid double-decker buses were introduced. In the years prior to this, the service has been operated by a mixture of single-deck Scania OmniCity and double-deck Volvo B7TL/East Lancs Vyking, Volvo B7TL/Plaxton President and Volvo B7TL/Wright Gemini vehicles. These buses were branded in a distinctive pink livery featuring the route's namesake landmark.

A fleet of Euro 6 Wright StreetDeck diesel double-decker buses were introduced in January 2018, branded in a two-tone green livery, again featuring the route's namesake landmark. The total cost of introducing the vehicles was £4.5 million, with vehicles featuring tables, USB charging, next stop audio-visual announcements and WIFi, as well as increased capacity when compared to the vehicles they replaced.

In May 2019, additional Friday and Saturday evening and Sunday morning journeys were added. Some journeys were later cut during the COVID-19 pandemic, including all-night services.

An all-night service was restored in September 2020 on Friday and Saturday nights, with a daily 24-hour service being introduced in May 2021. At the time, it was one of just three routes (including 56 and 60) operated by Go North East which operated with daily 24-hour service. In July 2022, the late-night service was scaled back to operate on Friday and Saturday nights only.

In June 2020, the route was amended, with most journeys (excluding late-night) rerouted to serve Arnison Centre Retail Park.

In September 2021, the service was extended to additionally serve Neville's Cross, Langley Moor and Brandon half-hourly on weekdays and Saturday daytimes.

In September 2024, the service's frequency was increased to every 7–8 minutes between Newcastle upon Tyne and Chester-le-Street – adding over 15,000 extra seats per week.

In July 2025, the late-night service was altered to terminate at Howlands Park and Ride.

In January 2026, a fleet of Euro 6 Wright StreetDeck Electroliner battery electric double-decker buses, branded in a two-tone green livery depicting Antony Gormley's Angel of the North, were introduced.

== Route ==
As of July 2026, the route operates between Newcastle upon Tyne, Chester-le-Street and Durham, with weekday and Saturday daytime journeys extending to Brandon, and Friday and Saturday late-night N21 services continuing to Howlands Park and Ride. Between Newcastle upon Tyne and Durham, the route is supplemented by the half-hourly (Note: Operates hourly during evening and Sunday, with most evening and Sunday journeys terminating at Bishop Auckland.) X21 express service, which continues to Croxdale, Tudhoe, Spennymoor, Bishop Auckland, and West Auckland, operating as a limited-stop service between Gateshead and Chester-le-Street.

The route begins at Eldon Square in the heart of the city of Newcastle upon Tyne. Towards Gateshead, buses cross the River Tyne via the High Level Bridge, with buses towards the city operating via the Tyne Bridge. After leaving Gateshead, the service runs through Shipcote, Low Fell and Harlow Green before passing Antony Gormley's Angel of the North. It then continues through Birtley and Barley Mow, before reaching the market town of Chester-le-Street, where most journeys terminate.

Beyond Chester-le-Street, the route follows the A167, serving Chester Moor, Plawsworth, Arnison Centre, Pity Me, Framwellgate Moor and the University Hospital of North Durham before reaching the cathedral city of Durham. On weekdays and Saturday daytimes, most journeys continue to the south-west of the city via Neville's Cross and Langley Moor to Brandon. On Friday and Saturday nights, the N21 continues through the city centre via Durham University, before terminating at Howlands Park and Ride.

== Service and operations ==
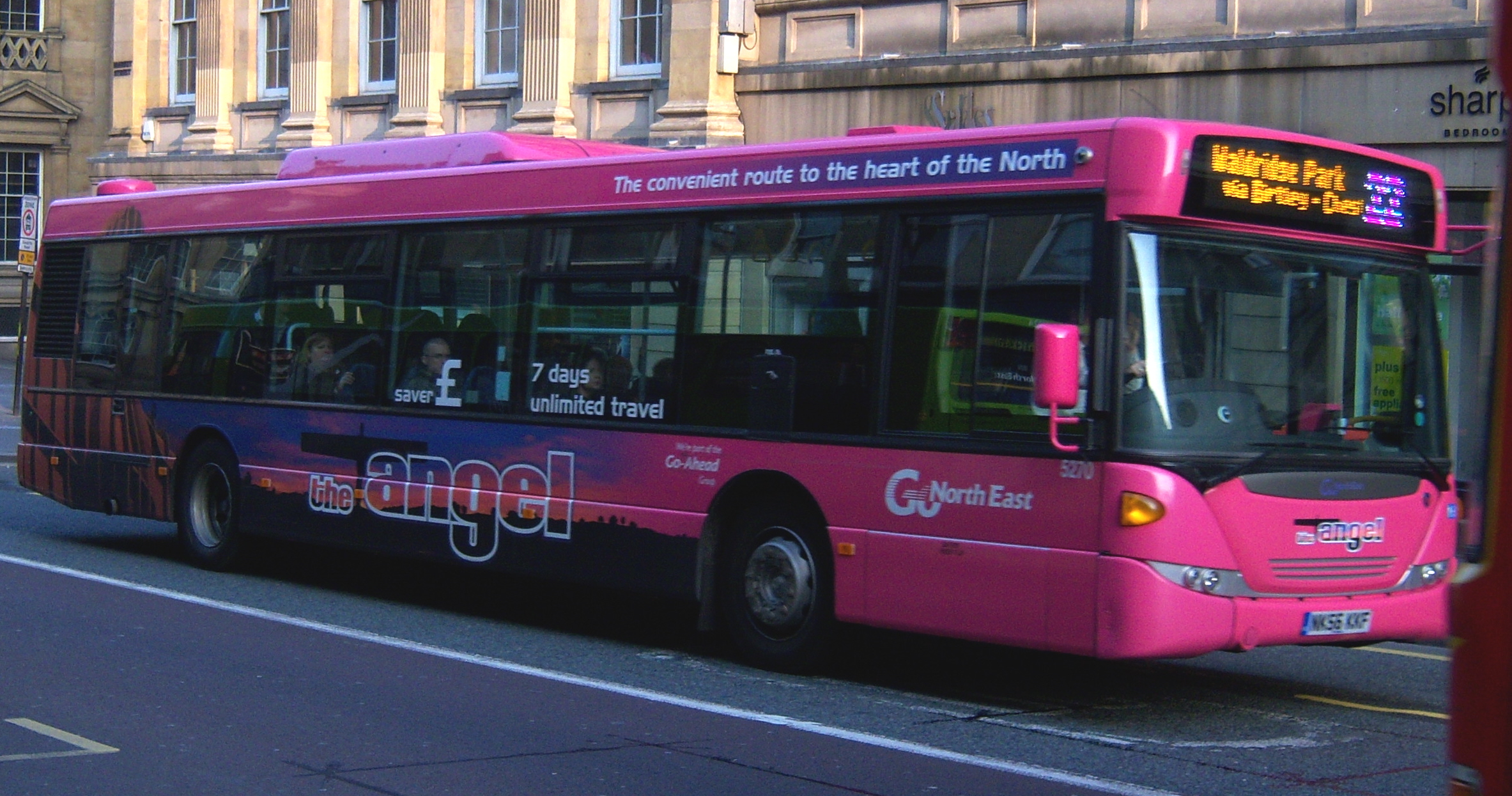
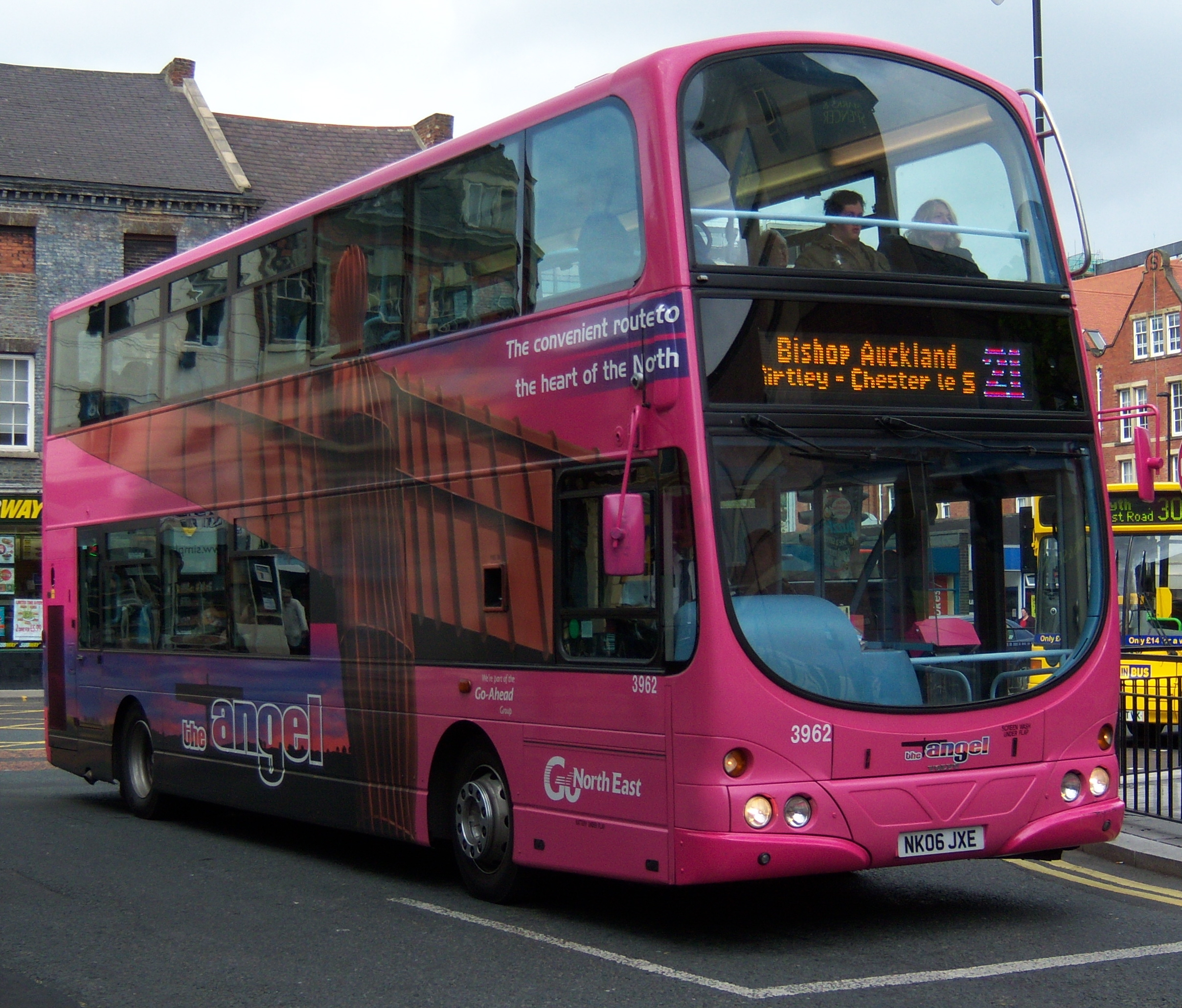
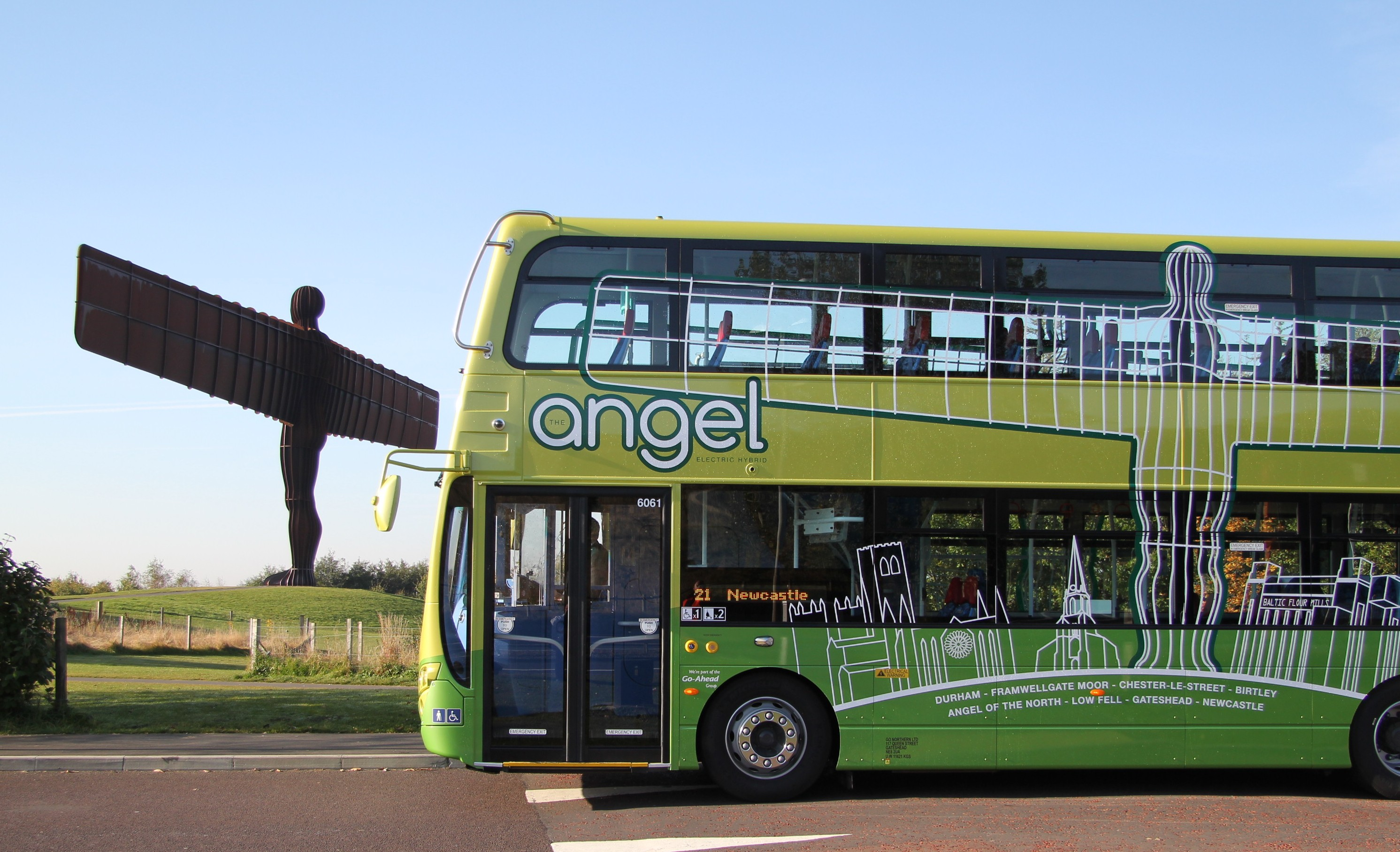
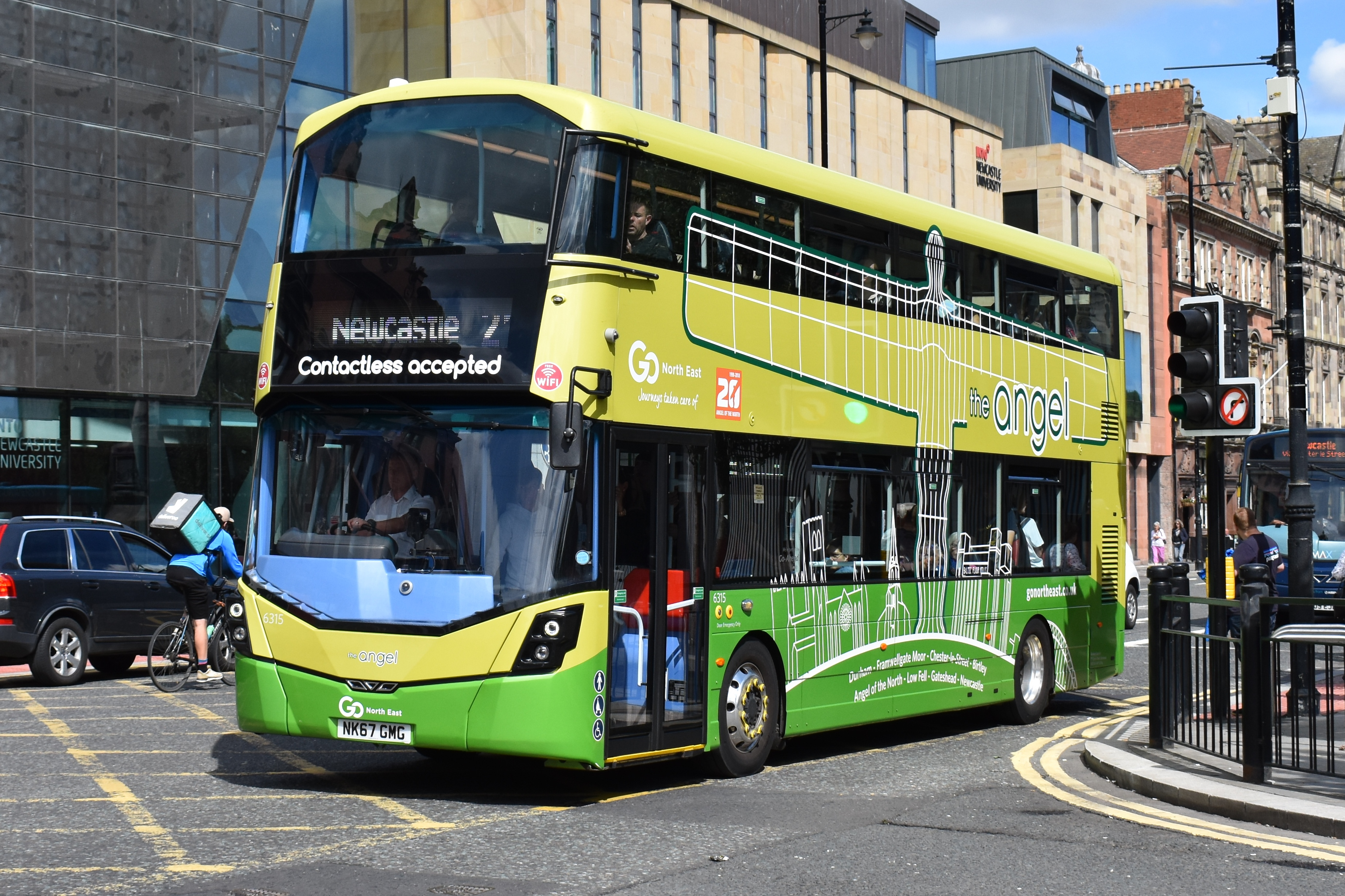
Route branding: past and present

As of July 2026, the route operates up to every 7 minutes between Newcastle upon Tyne and Chester-le-Street, with services extending to Durham every half-hour. On weekday and Saturday daytimes, the route continues to Brandon every half-hour. On Friday and Saturday late-night services operate between Newcastle upon Tyne and Durham (Howlands) hourly between 00:00–04:00.

The route is currently operated by a fleet of Wright StreetDeck Electroliner battery electric double-decker buses, branded in a two-tone green livery depicting Antony Gormley's Angel of the North. These vehicles were introduced in January 2026, as part of a £17 million investment, and can travel up to 275 miles (443 km) on a single charge. They feature USB charging, next stop audio-visual announcements and free WIFi.
