= Wright GB Hawk =

Low floor single-deck bus

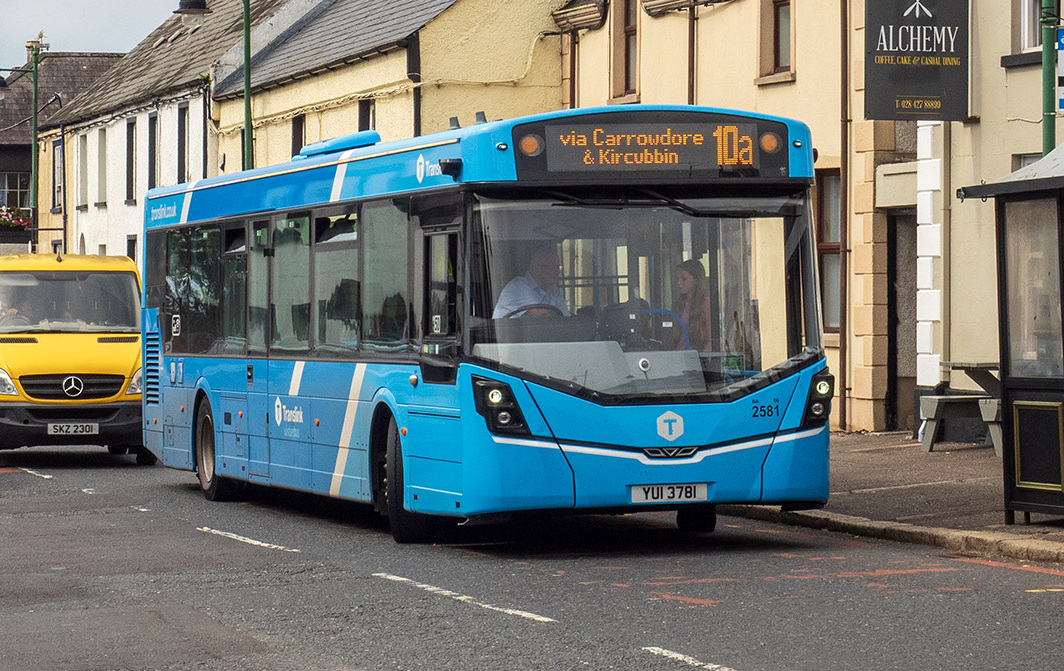
- Translink Ulsterbus Wright GB Hawk in Greyabbey in August 2025

Overview
- Manufacturer: Wrightbus
- Production: 2021–2026
- Assembly: Ballymena, Northern Ireland

Body and chassis
- Doors: 1 or 2
- Floor type: Low floor
- Chassis: Integral
- Related: Wright GB Kite; Wright StreetDeck

Powertrain
- Engine: Daimler OM934 5.1 litre 4-cylinder Euro VI diesel Daimler OM936 7.7 litre 6-cylinder Euro VI diesel
- Capacity: 91 (40 seated, 56 standing)
- Transmission: Voith DIWA D854.6 4-speed automatic

Dimensions
- Length: 12.1 metres (40 ft)
- Width: 2.5 metres (8.2 ft)
- Height: 3.2 metres (10 ft)
- Curb weight: 18,200 kilograms (40,100 lb)

Chronology
- Predecessor: Wright Eclipse 3

The Wright GB Hawk is a full-size single-deck bus produced by Wrightbus in Ballymena, Northern Ireland between 2021 and 2022. The first all-new model to be launched by Wrightbus following their takeover by JCB, the GB Hawk is an integral design consisting of the same chassis and body design as the existing double-decker Wright StreetDeck; it is also powered by the same Daimler OM934 engine found in the StreetDeck and StreetLite.

The GB Hawk replaces the Wright Eclipse 3 on the Volvo B8RLE chassis at the top end of the Wrightbus single-deck bus range, as they consolidate towards producing only integral vehicles, and competes with heavyweight designs such as the MCV Evora and the Scania Fencer. Production of the GB Hawk commenced in January 2021. With the discontinuation of the StreetLite in 2024, the GB Hawk is now the only diesel single-deck bus produced by Wrightbus.

The first GB Hawk entered service on non-passenger trials with Ipswich Buses in February 2021. Northern Irish state operator Ulsterbus were the first and so far only operator to place orders for the GB Hawk, with 123 examples entering service with the operator between mid-2021 and late 2022.
