= 56th Group =

56th Group may refer to:

- 56th Fighter Group, a unit of the United States Army Air Force
- 56th Operations Group, a unit of the United States Air Force

== See also ==
- 56th Division (disambiguation)
- 56th Brigade (disambiguation)
- 56th Regiment (disambiguation)
- 56th Squadron (disambiguation)
