= LVI =

LVI may refer to:

- 56 (number), LVI in Roman numerals
- Literacy Volunteers of Illinois, an American adult literacy organisation
- Livingstone Airport, in Livingstone, Zambia
- Landcare Victoria Inc., an Australian organisation
- Load value injection, a security vulnerability
- Lymphovascular invasion, invasion of cancer to blood vessels
- Super Bowl LVI, an American football championship game being hosted in 2022
