= 56th Street =

56th Street may refer to:

- 56th Street (Manhattan) in New York City
- 56th Street in Tsawwassen, British Columbia, the only land connection between Point Roberts, Washington and the rest of North America
- 55th/56th/57th Street station, a Metra and South Shore Line station in Chicago, Illinois
- 56th Street station, a SEPTA Metro station in Philadelphia, Pennsylvania
