= 56th Infantry Division (South Korea) =

- Active: 7 January 1984 - present
- Country: South Korea
- Branch: Republic of Korea Army
- Type: Infantry
- Role: Reserve forces
- Size: Division
- Part of: Capital Defense Command
- Garrison/HQ: Goyang, Gyeonggi Province
- Nickname(s): "Bukhansan"
- Colors: Orange

Commanders
- Current commander: Maj. Gen. Choi In-soo

The 56th Homeland Defense Infantry Division (Korean: 제56보병사단) is a military formation of the ROKA. The 56th division is subordinated to the Capital Defense Command and is headquartered in Goyang City, Gyeonggi Province. Its responsibility is the defense of Seoul and recruit training.

The division was created on 7 January 1984.

== Organization ==
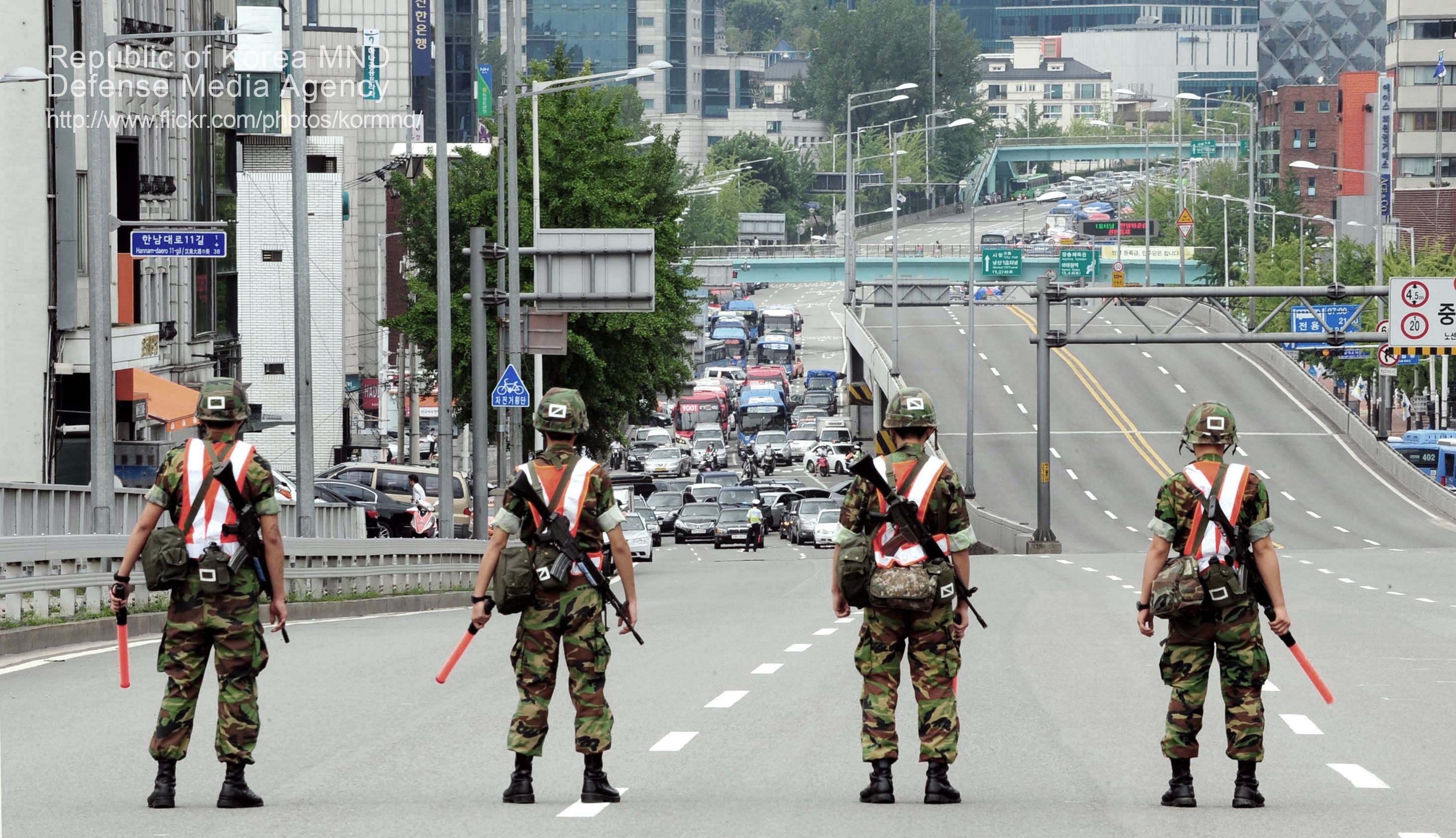
Soldiers of the 56th Infantry Division blocked vehicle to pass Hannam Bridge in 2012.

- Headquarters:
  - Reconnaissance Battalion
  - Engineer Battalion
  - Mobile Battalion
  - Signal Battalion
  - Support Battalion
  - Military Police Battalion
  - Medical Battalion
  - Chemical Battalion
  - Headquarters Company
- 218th Infantry Brigade
- 219th Infantry Brigade
- 220th Infantry Brigade
- 221st Infantry Brigade
