= Literacy Volunteers of Illinois =

- Founded: 1979
- Purpose: Adult Literacy
- Location: Chicago, Illinois
- Key people: John McLeod, LVI Board Treasurer Chamala Jordan, Executive Director
- Website: www.lvillinois.org

Literacy Volunteers of Illinois (LVI) is a 501(c)(3) nonprofit organization that promotes adult literacy throughout Illinois. It serves families, adults, and out-of-school teens.

== History ==
Literacy Volunteers of Illinois (LVI) was founded in 1979 to serve as a technical assistance and training agency for volunteer literacy programs affiliated with the national Literacy Volunteers of America organization. It initially served as a "mid-level" support system for local affiliated programs with the goal of monitoring and providing training to programs.

The two recessions of the 1980s and the resulting displacement of millions of workers in the manufacturing industry who had difficulty finding new jobs based on their skill sets, sparked concerns about the literacy abilities of the nation's population. The National Literacy Act of 1991 and the results of the National Adult Literacy Survey of 1993, which found that one in every four adults lacked basic literacy skills, also brought attention to the issue of low adult literacy rates in the U.S.

The national recognition of a need for adult literacy initiatives helped it earn funding for AmeriCorps VISTA and AmeriCorps National Service Programs that place members in adult and family literacy programs around Illinois. In 1995 the Jump Start Program began, which recruits volunteers to act as tutors and mentors for incarcerated youth in the Illinois Youth Centers. LVI began by working with four national programs. Today, it provides resources and services to staff, tutors, and students in approximately 7 adult literacy programs statewide.

== Programs and services ==
=== Resource and referral center ===
LVI serves as a clearinghouse for individuals interested in becoming volunteer tutors by connecting them with literacy programs in their communities. They also provide initial and in-service training to tutors and staff, an annual statewide staff development conference, and the annual tutor and adult learner On The Road To Literacy Spring conference.

=== National service ===
Since 1992, LVI has sponsored five different federal and state AmeriCorps and AmeriCorps VISTA programs. These programs include the VISTA Literacy Corps, Project UPLIFT (Urging Partnerships in Literacy Initiatives for Families and Teens), Project I-CARE (Involving Communities in America Reads Endeavors), Project HEART (Hines Employees As Reading Tutors), and the current VOCAL (Volunteer Action in Community Literacy) Program. LVI has placed over 600 national service members in 150 adult, family literacy, and Jump Start programs throughout Illinois.

LVI began its involvement in national service programs in 1992 as a sponsor of the AmeriCorps VISTA Literacy Corps. AmeriCorps*VISTA is a federally funded capacity building program that serves primarily low-income communities. With the goal of strengthening and expanding volunteer literacy initiatives in under served communities in Illinois LVI placed over 100 VISTA Literacy Corps members in a variety of adult and family literacy programs over the course of 15 years.

Sponsorship of the AmeriCorps VISTA Literacy Corps eventually led to involvement in the AmeriCorps Program. Project UPLIFT, a collaboration on behalf of five agencies, was the first AmeriCorps Program that was developed. Members provided adult and family literacy services in communities served by the five agencies. It also acted as an incubator for two additional AmeriCorps Programs that became funded on their own – one at the Center for School Improvement at the University of Chicago and Project MORE at the University of Illinois at Chicago.

VOCAL AmeriCorps

VOCAL (Volunteer Outreach for Community Action in Literacy) was founded by LVI in 2003 with funding from the Corporation for National and Community Service and is currently in its 23rd year. Since its inception, 331 AmeriCorps Members have served as "literacy specialists" in 40 different community and faith based adult literacy programs in Chicago and the surrounding suburbs. Their roles include One-to-one and small group tutoring, recruiting volunteers to serve as tutors, and participating in a training and development program.

=== Correctional education ===
The Jump Start Program is a one-to-one tutoring and mentorship program operating in the Illinois Youth Centers (IYC) in the new department of Juvenile Justice. The program began in 1995 with a three-year grant from the Retirement Research Foundation and support from the Illinois Retired Teachers Association. The Program continues to recruit retirees, especially retired teachers, with the skills to serve as volunteer tutors and mentors to incarcerated youth. LVI continues to work closely with School District #428 of the Illinois Department of Juvenile Justice in its efforts to raise the literacy levels of incarcerated youth.

Jump Start serves youth incarcerated in IYCs in Chicago, Harrisburg, St. Charles and Warrenville. The target population of Jump Start is teens age 17 and over who are performing below a 9th grade level in reading and/or math. Jump Start tutors focus not only on academics, but also serve as mentors in order to address the emotional and social needs of at-risk youth.

=== New Readers for New Life ===
New Readers for New Life is a network of past and current adult literacy students. LVI provides consultation, training, and administrative support to the statewide organization. It also encourages students to be active participants in all phases of the learning process from choosing the materials they want to read to taking leadership roles within their programs. Every fall the New Readers organization sponsors a statewide conference for students, tutors, and staff of adult literacy programs.

== Events and Fundraisers ==
=== SCRABBLE for Literacy ===
The first SCRABBLE for Literacy Challenge was held in the fall of 2004. The annual fundraiser, which is held in October or November, is supported by the National Scrabble Association Local Clubs #240 and #601 and the Rotary Club of Chicago-Lakeview. Participants play one another in Scrabble and also bid on items during a silent auction.

=== New Readers Conference ===
The New Readers Conference began in 1993 by the New Readers for New Life and is held annually in October or November. Over 1,000 individuals from 21 states have attended this event since its inception. This day-long conference is broken into workshops and discussions.

=== On the Road to Literacy Conference ===
On the Road to Literacy is an annual daylong conference for tutors and adult learners. LVI began organizing the conference in 1995. The conference consists of three rounds of workshops focused on topics relevant to the development of volunteer tutors and adult learners. There is also a featured keynote speaker and a ceremony recognizing outstanding volunteer literacy tutors from around Illinois. Each year awards are presented to the Tutor of the Year as well as the Partner Agency of the Year.

== See also ==
- Literacy in the United States
