= Grayson Thermal Systems =

British air conditions manufacturing company for passenger vehicles

- Company type: Private company
- Industry: Heating, ventilation, and air conditioning
- Founded: 1978; 48 years ago
- Founder: Graham Hateley
- Headquarters: Birmingham, United Kingdom
- Area served: Worldwide
- Products: Cooling, heating, and air conditioning systems for passenger vehicles
- Website: www.graysonts.com

Grayson Thermal Systems is a British manufacturer based in Birmingham. The firm is based in Tyseley and designs, manufactures, and supplies cooling, heating, and air conditioning products for buses, coaches, commercial, specialist, hybrid and electric vehicles.

In 2007 the Grayson Group created a subsidiary Matco Engineering, a machining business set up to bring high-end service to the low and medium volume sector. There are now four Grayson manufacturing facilities globally.

== History ==
In 1978 chairman Graham Hateley formed Grayson Thermal Systems to service aftermarket customers. Expansion took place quickly and by 1994 Grayson was the largest re-manufacturer of service exchange radiators in Europe. In 1997, Grayson entered the bus and coach market offering cooling system parts to the UK market. This led the company to enter the OEM equipment market in 1998 and instead of just parts, manufacturing complete cooling modules.

In 2004, Grayson made the move into the European market with orders coming in from Sweden, Germany, Bulgaria, Israel, Romania, the Netherlands, and Finland. Since 2004, Grayson have continued their expansion into the European market with contracts in Poland, Serbia, and France. In 2008, the company developed a three-year plan to continue expansion of the business with their main operations moving to a larger site to increase OE production.

Grayson Thermal Systems Corporation was formed in 2018, an American subsidiary of Grayson in Franklin, Indiana, USA. A new facility opened to take their manufacturing capabilities of OE production into the North and South American market making their products and services more accessible worldwide. In 2010, new Managing Director Stuart Hateley took up the post in place of his father Graham Hateley (Now Chairman of Grayson Thermal Systems). In 2018, customer locations and usage of Grayson products now range from China, North America, South America, Eastern and Central Europe and New Zealand.

== Products ==
- In 1998, Grayson successfully patented the Cassette™ radiator designed for the bus and coach industry. The radiator offers removal and refit in an hour.
- In 2017, the Grayson Electric Water Pump was launched. It was developed specifically for hybrid and electric vehicle applications within any automotive industry.
- The Grayson Battery Thermal Management System (BTMS) for cooling of batteries used in hybrid and electric vehicles, was also launched in 2017.
