= Cityrider 56 =

Bus service in North East England

- Locale: Tyne and Wear, England
- Service area: Newcastle upon Tyne; Gateshead; Wrekenton; Springwell Village; Washington; Sunderland
- Service type: Bus service
- Fleet: Volvo B9TL/Wright Gemini 2
- Operator: Go North East
- Website: Go North East

The Cityrider 56 is a bus service operated by Go North East, connecting the cities of Newcastle upon Tyne and Sunderland in Tyne and Wear, England.

== History ==
In 2006, operator Go North East introduced route branding – a practice which aimed to give each service, or group of services, a recognisable identity, colour scheme and logo. The service was subsequently branded as Fab Fifty Six – operated by a fleet of diesel Scania L94UB/Wright Solar single-deck buses in a distinctive floral orange livery.

In May 2009, late-night services were introduced on Friday and Saturday nights, which operated as N56 and additionally served Washington Galleries.

In January 2014, the service was significantly upgraded at a cost of around £3 million, with the introduction of a fleet of 17 diesel Volvo B9TL/Wright Gemini 2 double-deck vehicles. Initially branded in a floral orange livery, much like those they replaced, the upgraded vehicles included new features such as free WiFi, power sockets and audio-visual next stop announcements.

In January 2021, the service was rebranded Cityrider, with vehicles receiving a mid-life refurbishment, and rebranded in a two-tone orange and red livery.

A daily 24-hour service was introduced in May 2021. At the time, it was one of three services (including services 21 and 60) operated by Go North East which ran to a daily 24-hour service. As of August 2026, it is the only service operated by Go North East which operates a daily 24-hour service.

In July 2022, evening services were amended to additionally serve Beacon Lough East Estate between Queen Elizabeth Hospital and Wrekenton, owing to concurrent service reductions on service 57.

== Route ==
The route begins at Market Street in the heart of the city of Newcastle upon Tyne. Towards Gateshead, buses cross the River Tyne via the High Level Bridge, with buses towards the city operating via the Tyne Bridge. After leaving Gateshead, the service heads south-east along Old Durham Road, serving Deckham and Sheriff Hill, before reaching the Queen Elizabeth Hospital.

Beyond Queen Elizabeth Hospital, the route continues towards Wrekenton. During the daytime, buses operate directly along Old Durham Road, with evening journeys diverting through Beacon Lough East Estate.

The service continues through Wrekenton, before leaving the borough of Gateshead, entering the City of Sunderland at Springwell Village, before continuing through Washington, serving Donwell, Concord and Sulgrave.

Leaving Sulgrave, buses serve the International Advanced Manufacturing Park and nearby Nissan UK manufacturing plant, before reaching the northern suburbs of Sunderland, passing through Hylton Castle, Hylton Red House and Southwick.

Continuing in to the city, buses pass the Stadium of Light, before serving Monkwearmouth and St Peter's. The route then crosses the River Wear, operating via Keel Square and St Mary's Boulevard, serving City Hall and Empire Theatre respectively, before arriving at Park Lane Interchange. Departing towards Newcastle upon Tyne, services operate via Burdon Road and Fawcett Street.

== Service and operations ==
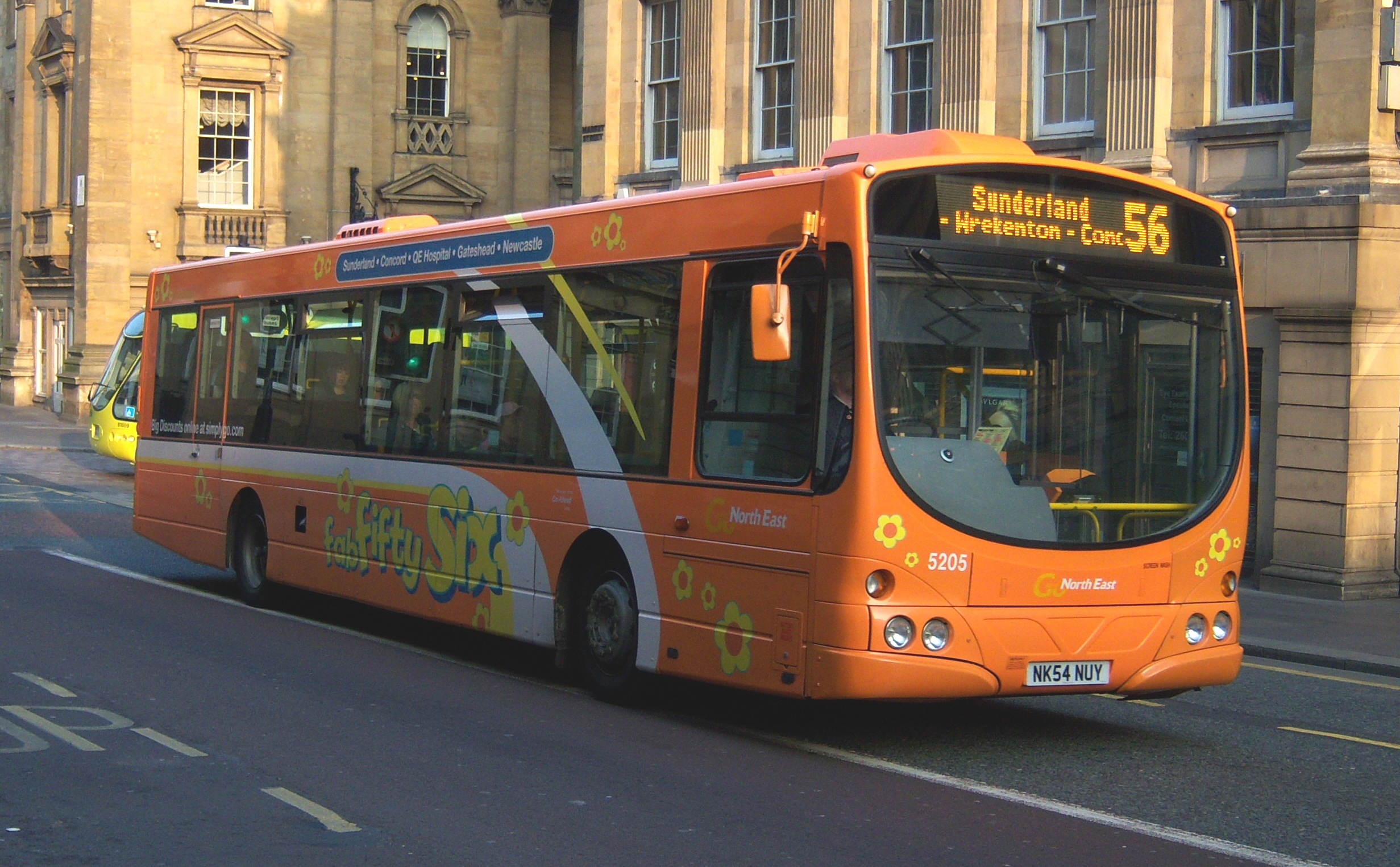
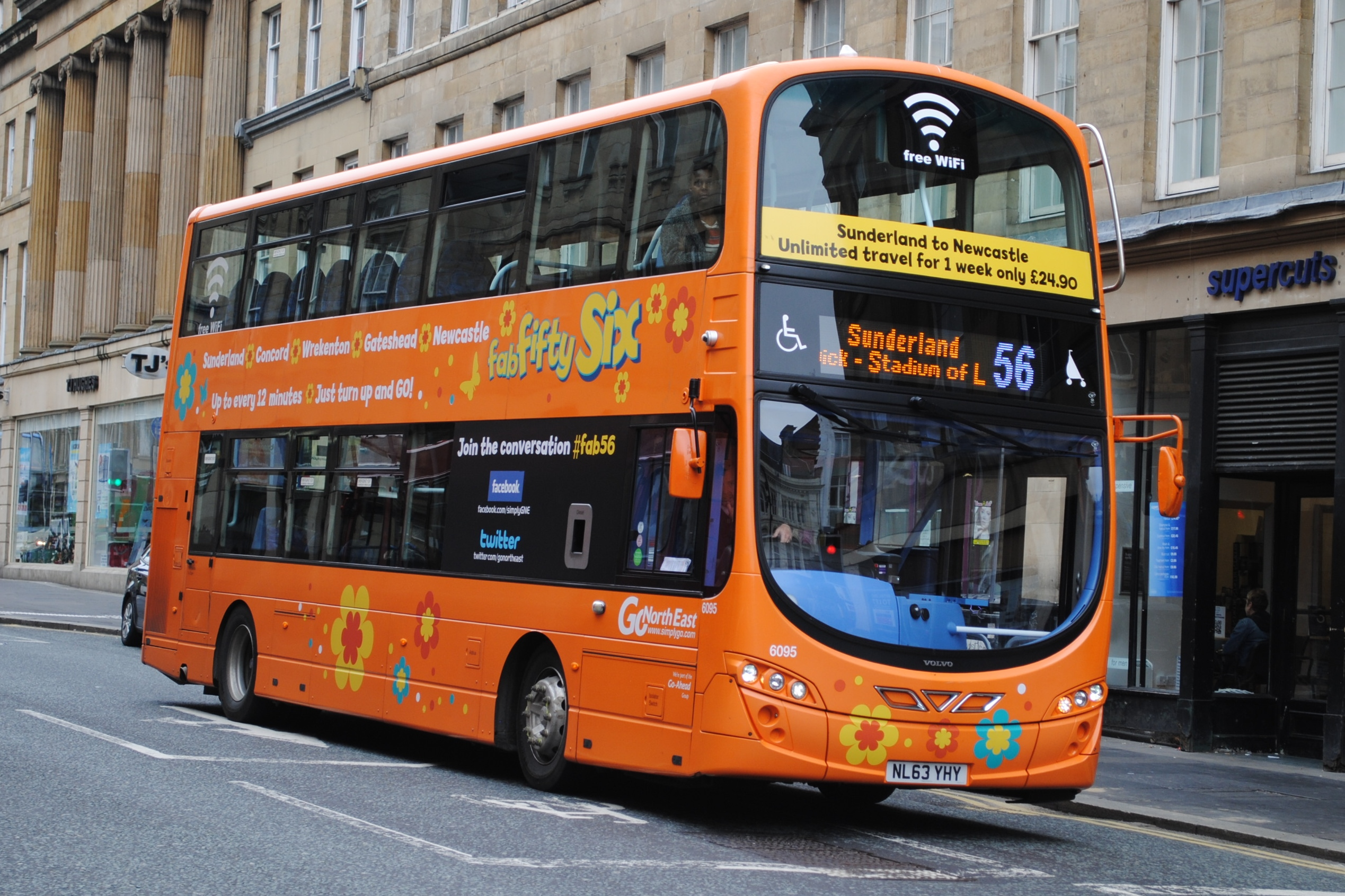
Route branding: past and present

As of August 2026, the route operates up to every 12 minutes between Newcastle upon Tyne and Sunderland on weekday and Saturday daytimes, and up to every 20 minutes on Sunday daytimes. During the evening, services operate half-hourly, with a mostly hourly late-night service.

The route is operated by a fleet of Euro 6 Volvo B9TL/Wright Gemini 2 double-decker buses, branded in a two-tone orange and red livery. These vehicles were introduced in January 2014.
