= 56th Division =

56th Division may refer to:

- 56th Army Division, People's Republic of China
- 56th Infantry Division (German Empire), Imperial German Army
- 56th Infantry Division (Wehrmacht), German Army, World War II
- 56th Division (Imperial Japanese Army)
- 56th Infantry Division "Casale", Kingdom of Italy, World War II
- 56th Infantry Division (Russian Empire)
- 56th Infantry Division (South Korea)
- 56th Guards Rifle Division, Soviet Union
- 56th Motor Rifle Division, Soviet Union
- 56th Rifle Division, Soviet Union
- 56th (London) Infantry Division, British Army

== See also ==
- List of military divisions by number
- 56th Brigade (disambiguation)
- 56th Group (disambiguation)
- 56th Regiment (disambiguation)
- 56th Squadron (disambiguation)
- 56 (Olpherts) Battery Royal Artillery
