= 56th Infantry Division (Russian Empire) =

- 56-я пехотная дивизия
- Active: 1914–1918
- Country: Russian Empire
- Branch: Russian Imperial Army
- Role: Infantry
- Engagements: World War I; Battle of Tannenberg

The 56th Infantry Division (Russian: 56-я пехотная дивизия, 56-ya Pekhotnaya Diviziya) was an infantry formation of the Russian Imperial Army.

== Organization ==
- 1st Brigade
  - 221st Roslav Infantry Regiment
  - 222nd Krasnan Infantry Regiment
- 2nd Brigade
  - 223rd Odoev Infantry Regiment
  - 224th Yukhnov Infantry Regiment
- 56th Artillery Brigade
