= 56 Squadron =

56 Squadron or 56th Squadron may refer to:

- No. 56 Squadron RAF, a unit of the United Kingdom Royal Air Force
- 56th Strategic Reconnaissance Squadron, a unit of the United States Air Force
- 56th Rescue Squadron, a unit of the United States Air Force
- 56th Airlift Squadron, a unit of the United States Air Force

== See also ==
- 56th Division (disambiguation)
- 56th Group (disambiguation)
- 56th Brigade (disambiguation)
- 56th Regiment (disambiguation)
