= 56th Regiment =

56th Regiment may refer to:

- 56th (West Essex) Regiment of Foot, a unit of the British Army
- 56th (King's Own) Anti-Tank Regiment, Royal Artillery, a unit of the British Army
- 56th Punjabi Rifles (Frontier Force), a unit of the British Indian Army
- 56th Infantry Regiment (United States), a unit of United States Army during World War I and World War II
- 56th Air Defense Artillery Regiment, a unit of the United States Army
- 56th Field Artillery Regiment, RCA, a unit of the Canadian Army
- 56th Guards Air Assault Regiment, a unit of the Russian Airborne Troops

American Civil War

Union (Northern) Army

- 56th Massachusetts Infantry Regiment
- 56th New York Volunteer Infantry
- 56th Illinois Volunteer Infantry Regiment
- 56th Ohio Infantry
- 56th Regiment Indiana Infantry
- 56th United States Colored Infantry Regiment
- 56th Pennsylvania Infantry

Confederate (Southern) Army

- 56th North Carolina Infantry
- 56th Virginia Infantry

== See also ==
- 56th Division (disambiguation)
- 56th Group (disambiguation)
- 56th Brigade (disambiguation)
- 56th Squadron (disambiguation)
