= 56th Brigade =

56th Brigade or 56th Infantry Brigade may refer to:

== China ==
- 56th Motorized Infantry Brigade (People's Republic of China)

== India ==
- 56th Indian Brigade of the British Indian Army in World War I

== Japan ==
- 56th Independent Mixed Brigade

== Russia/Soviet Union ==
- 56th Guards Air Assault Brigade

== Ukraine ==
- 56th Motorized Brigade (Ukraine)

== United Kingdom ==
- 56th (Cornwall) Anti-Aircraft Brigade
- 56th (Northumbrian) Anti-Aircraft Brigade
- 56th Infantry Brigade (United Kingdom)

=== Artillery units ===
- 56th Brigade, Royal Field Artillery in World War I
- 56th (Wessex) Army Field Brigade, Royal Artillery after World War I
- 56th (Highland) Medium Brigade, Royal Garrison Artillery

== United States ==
- 56th Cavalry Brigade
- 56th Field Artillery Brigade, a unit of the United States Army
- 56th Infantry Brigade Combat Team, a Texas National guard unit
- 56th Mobile Brigade Combat Team, a Pennsylvania National guard unit

== See also ==
- 56th Division (disambiguation)
- 56th Group (disambiguation)
- 56th Regiment (disambiguation)
- 56th Squadron (disambiguation)
