= Glenoe =

Hamlet in County Antrim, Northern Ireland

Coordinates: 54°48′N 5°50′W

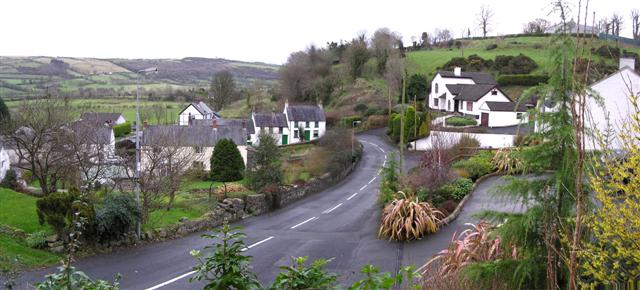
Glenoe village

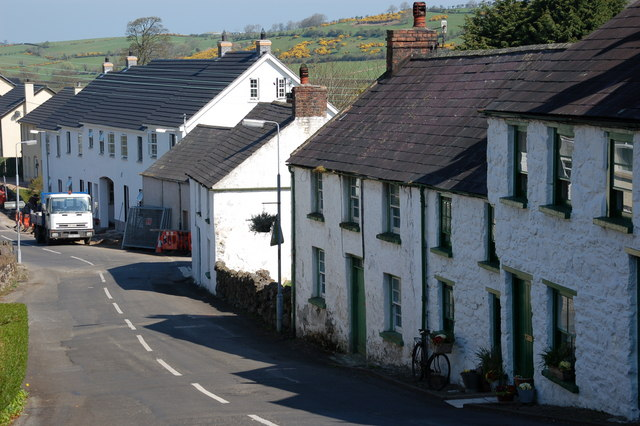
Houses in Glenoe

Glenoe or Gleno (from Irish Gleann Ó, meaning 'Glen of the mass or lump') is a hamlet in County Antrim, Northern Ireland. It is halfway between Larne and Carrickfergus. In the 2001 census, it had a population of 87 people. Glenoe is in the Mid and East Antrim Borough Council area.

== Places of interest ==
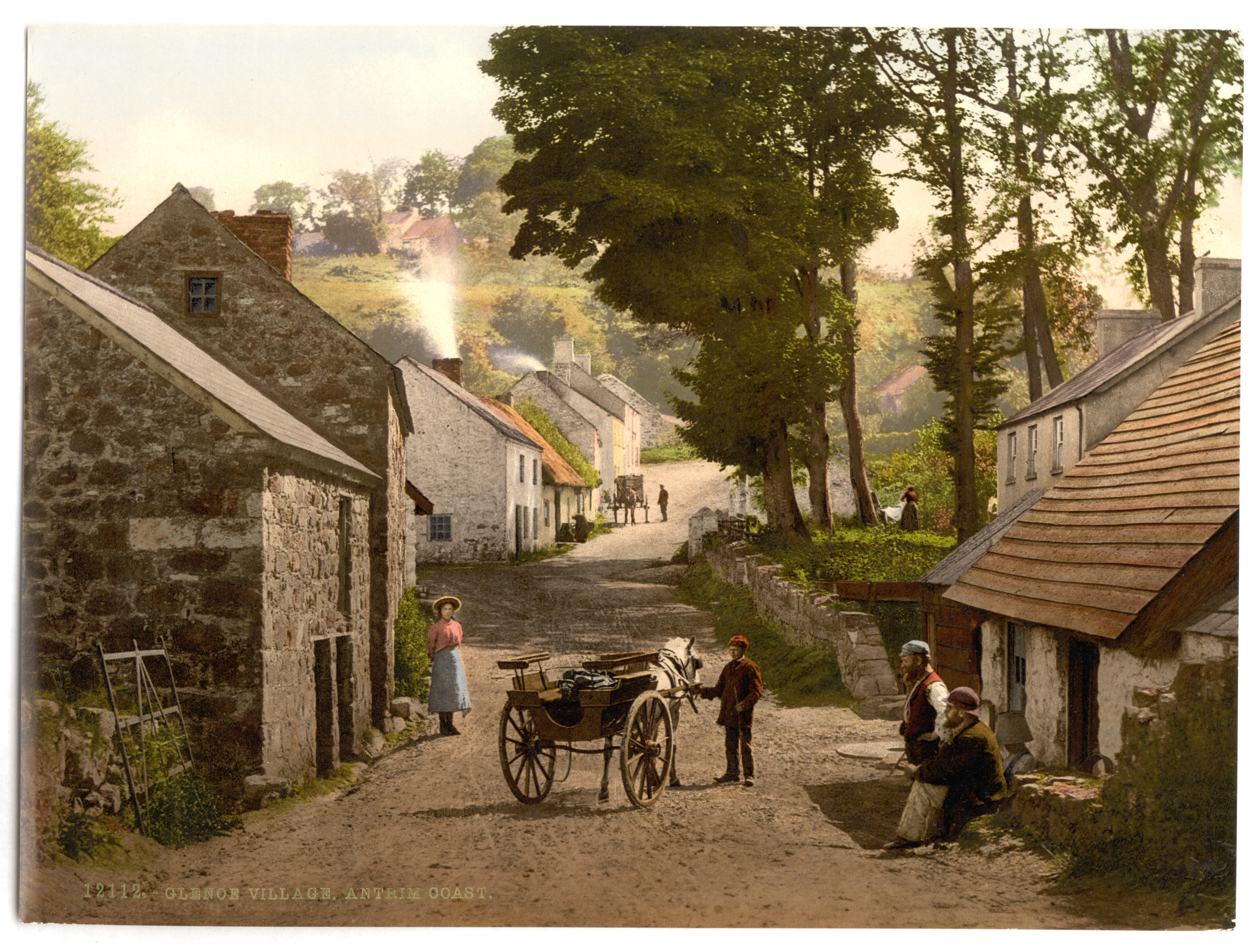
Glenoe Village. County Antrim, Ireland, ca.1895

Glenoe Waterfall, owned by the National Trust, is located near the village. A church, St. Columbas Church of Ireland, is located at the top of the village, nearby the Orange Hall and Young Farmer's Hall. The village is home to an Orange Lodge and a Royal Black Preceptory.

The Mauds Ice Cream factory was in Gleno, near the waterfall, between 1990 and 2000. It closed when the company moved to bigger premises in Carrickfergus.

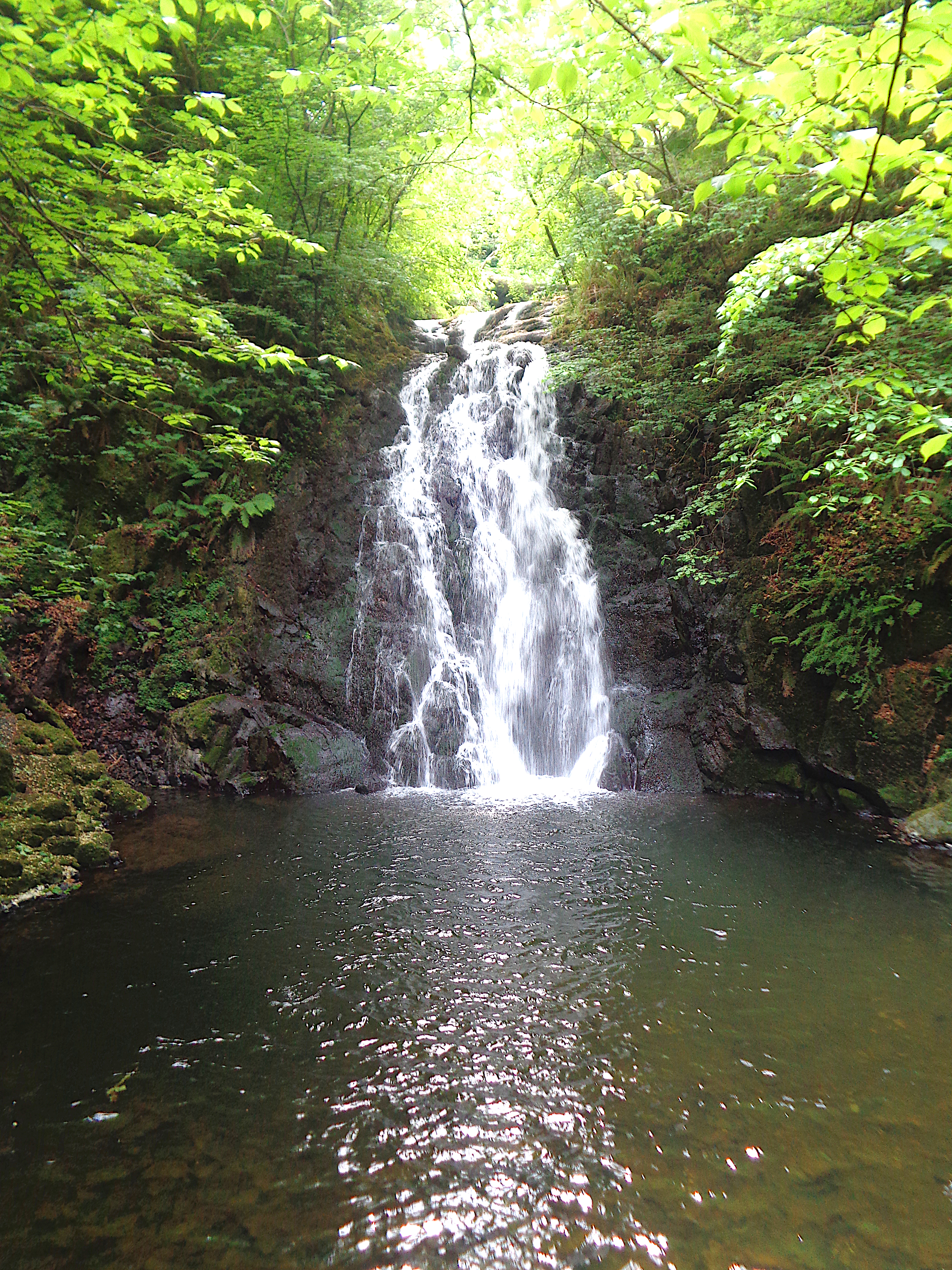
Gleno waterfall is a local attraction

== Notable people ==
- Roy Beggs, politician, Member of the Legislative Assembly.
- Martha Craig (1866–1950), writer, lecturer and explorer, was born at Carneal and educated at Gleno National School. She explored Labrador in Canada and spent several summers with Native American tribes, being awarded the honorary title of Princess and the name Enookwashwooshoh, meaning 'Brave Woman'.
- Werner Heubeck, German-born managing director of Ulsterbus, who lived near Gleno for part of his retirement.
- Gareth McAuley, association footballer who played internationally with the Northern Ireland national football team
