= Translink (Northern Ireland) =

Public transport operator in Northern Ireland

Northern Ireland Transport Holding Company
- Translink logo as of 2021

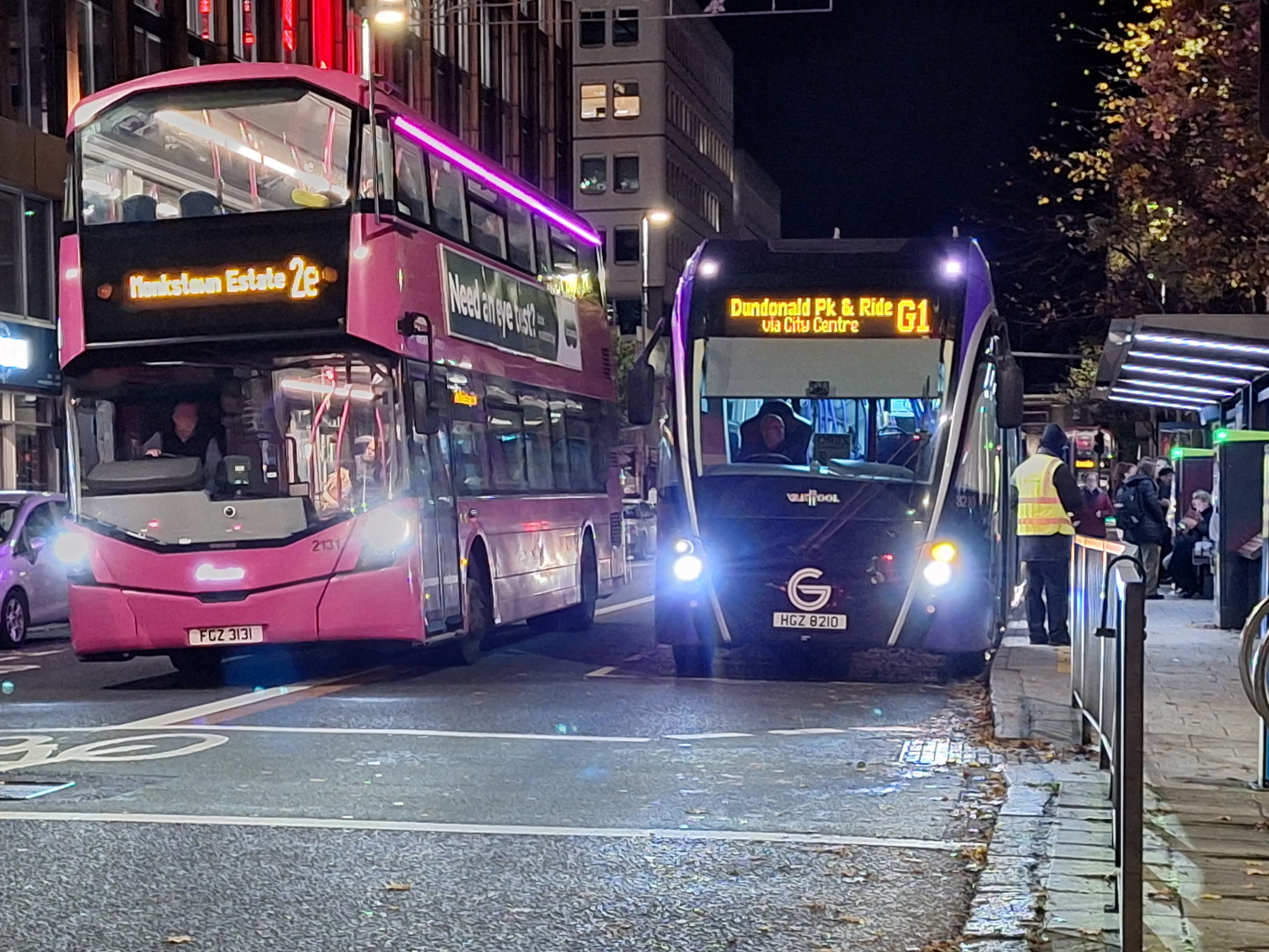
- Translink Metro and Glider vehicles in Belfast City Centre in November 2023
- Trade name: Translink
- Type: Subsidiary
- Industry: Public Transport
- Predecessor: Ulster Transport Authority; Citybus (Belfast)
- Founded: 1 January 1996; 30 years ago in Belfast, Northern Ireland
- Headquarters: 22 Great Victoria Street, Belfast, Northern Ireland
- Area served: Northern Ireland; Republic of Ireland (via Cross border Services)
- Key people: Chris Conway (CEO); Gordon Milligan (Chief Strategy Officer); Jacqui Kennedy (Chief People & Corporate Services Officer); Ronan O’Doherty (Interim Chief Financial Officer)
- Revenue: ▼£266.3M (2022) ▲£292.6M (2021) ▼£225.9M (2020)
- Number of employees: 4,064 (2021-22)
- Parent: Northern Ireland Transport Holding Company
- Subsidiaries: Ulsterbus; NI Railways; Metro; Glider; Foyle Metro
- Website: translink.co.uk

Northern Ireland Transport Holding Company (NITHC), operating as Translink, is a public corporation providing public transport in Northern Ireland. It operates services including NI Railways, Ulsterbus, Goldliner, Metro, Foyle Metro, and Glider.

Translink provides services all over Northern Ireland and also to Dublin, in a partnership deal with its counterpart in the Republic of Ireland, Córas Iompar Éireann (CIÉ), through its subsidiary Iarnród Éireann. It also provides local bus services in many towns and cities all over Northern Ireland including Bangor, Ballymena, Omagh, Craigavon and Antrim. The Metro service operates throughout Belfast, right out to outlying areas including Newtownabbey, Dundonald, Newtownbreda and Dunmurry, with the Foyle Metro service operating in Derry.

NITHCo was established in 1967 to take over the railway and bus services of the Ulster Transport Authority (UTA), namely Northern Ireland Railways (NIR) and Ulsterbus. In 1996 the Translink organisation was created to integrate the services of the Ulster Transport Authority as well as Citybus Limited (Belfast only – successor to the Belfast Corporation Transport Department). Citybus is now known as Metro.

== Company history ==
The Northern Ireland Transport Holding Company (NITHCo) is a government-owned body which was established in 1967 to take over the railway and bus services of the Ulster Transport Authority (UTA), namely, Northern Ireland Railways (NIR) and Ulsterbus. The company was established by the Transport Act (Northern Ireland) 1967.

In 1973, Citybus took over the bus services of the Belfast Corporation Transport Department.

Between 1971 and 1994, NITHCo ran Belfast International Airport through its subsidiary Northern Ireland Airports Limited (NIAL). In 1994, the government created Belfast International Airport Ltd (BIAL), which was sold to Belfast International Airport Holdings Ltd, a management/employee buy-out vehicle.

In 1996, the Translink brand name was created to integrate the services of Ulsterbus, NIR, and Citybus.

As of December 2021, the company is led by CEO Chris Conway.

== Northern Ireland Railways ==
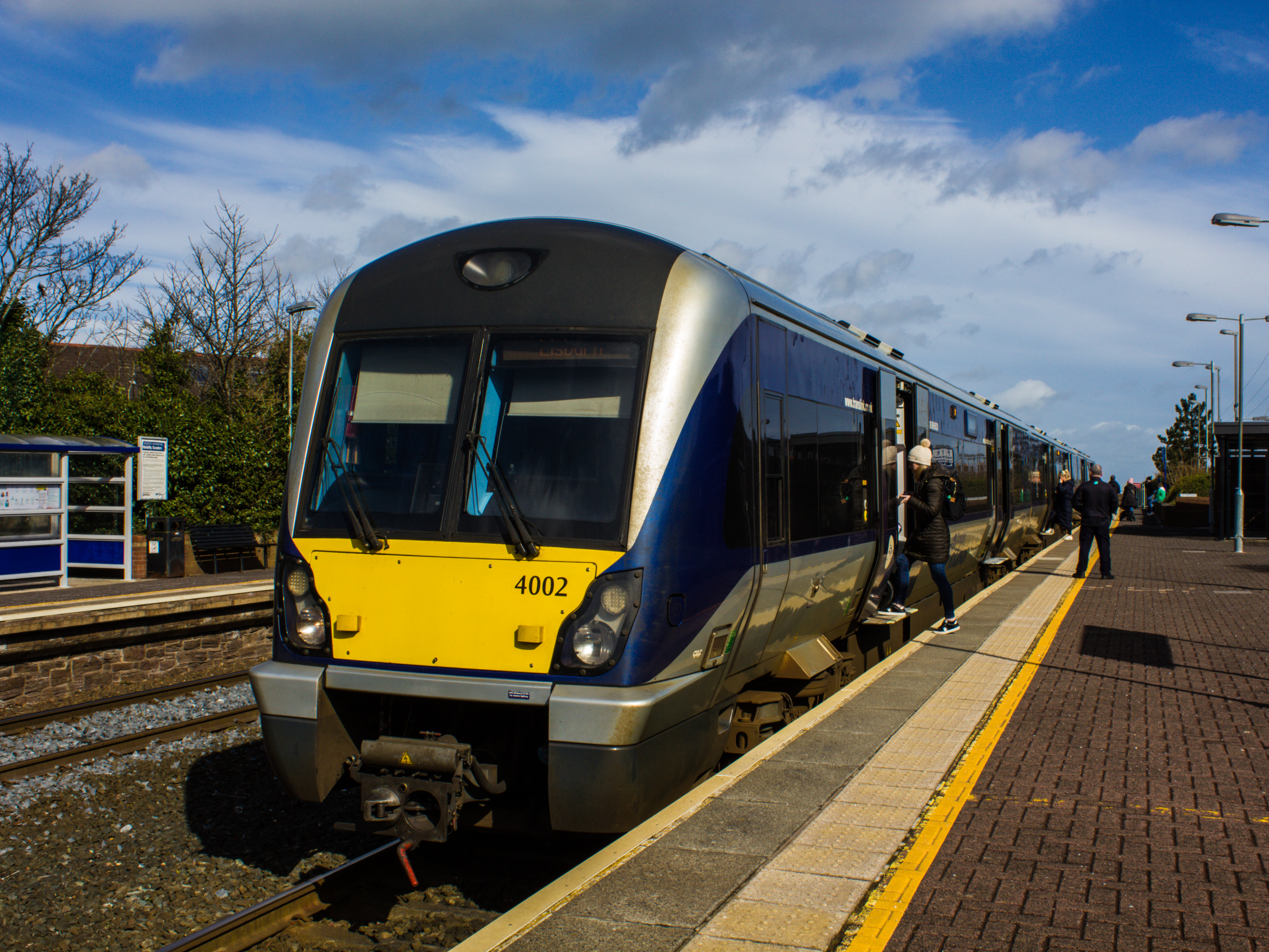
NIR Class 4000 at Holywood railway station, March 2022

Northern Ireland Railways (NIR), formerly and briefly called Ulster Transport Railways (UTR), is responsible for running the railway network in Northern Ireland. The Northern Irish railway network is currently 330.58 km (205.41 mi).

The main passenger line operates from Portadown to Bangor. In addition to this, Translink also provides rail services between Belfast and Derry to the north and Newry to the south, continuing across the border, which is part of the fast Enterprise service between Belfast and Dublin. Also operated are services to Larne and Portrush, which is a branch off the Belfast–Derry railway line, at Coleraine.

In 2014, Translink announced that they were looking at proposals for a service operating from Belfast International Airport to Belfast city centre. These included proposals to reopen the Lisburn–Antrim railway line, which was closed to passenger trains in June 2003 in favour of the Bleach Green line which provides a direct line between Belfast and Derry. The Lisburn-Antrim line passes Belfast International Airport and could be used to provide services to it. However, despite general political support from the Northern Ireland Assembly, there has been no movement on these proposals to date.

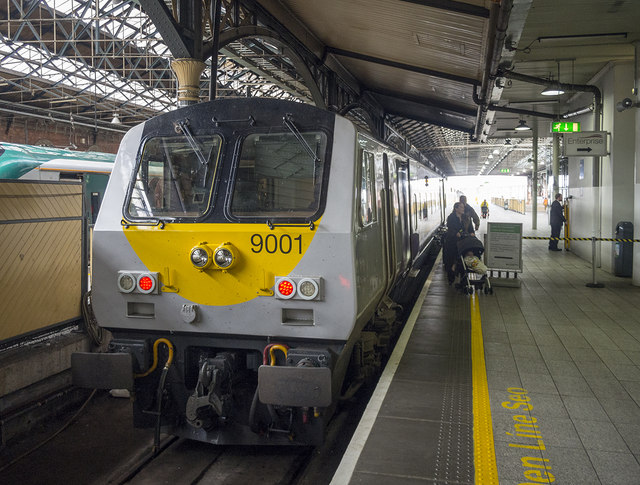
Enterprise at Dublin Connolly

The enterprise is owned by NIR and Irish Rail.

== Ulsterbus ==
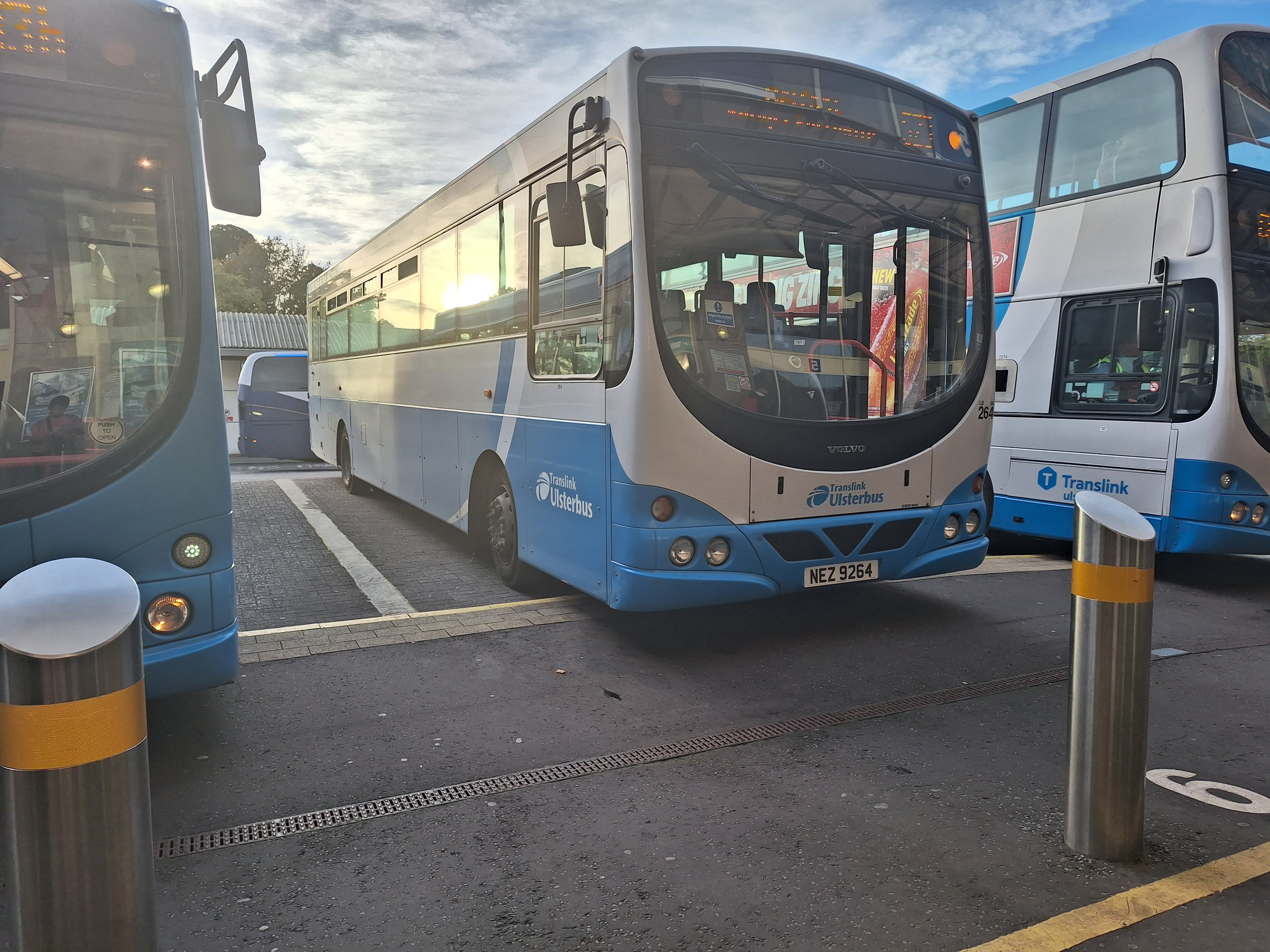
An Ulsterbus Volvo B7R at former Europa Buscentre in October 2023

Ulsterbus is responsible for most of the bus services in Northern Ireland. They operate around 20 bus stations which include: Armagh, Antrim, Lisburn, Bangor, Newtownards, Downpatrick, Newry, Craigavon, Dungannon, Omagh, Enniskillen, Derry, Coleraine, Ballymena, Magherafelt, Larne and Newcastle and others within Belfast and 1,100 buses. Ulsterbus is charged with transporting over 65,000 children per day to school.

=== Goldliner ===
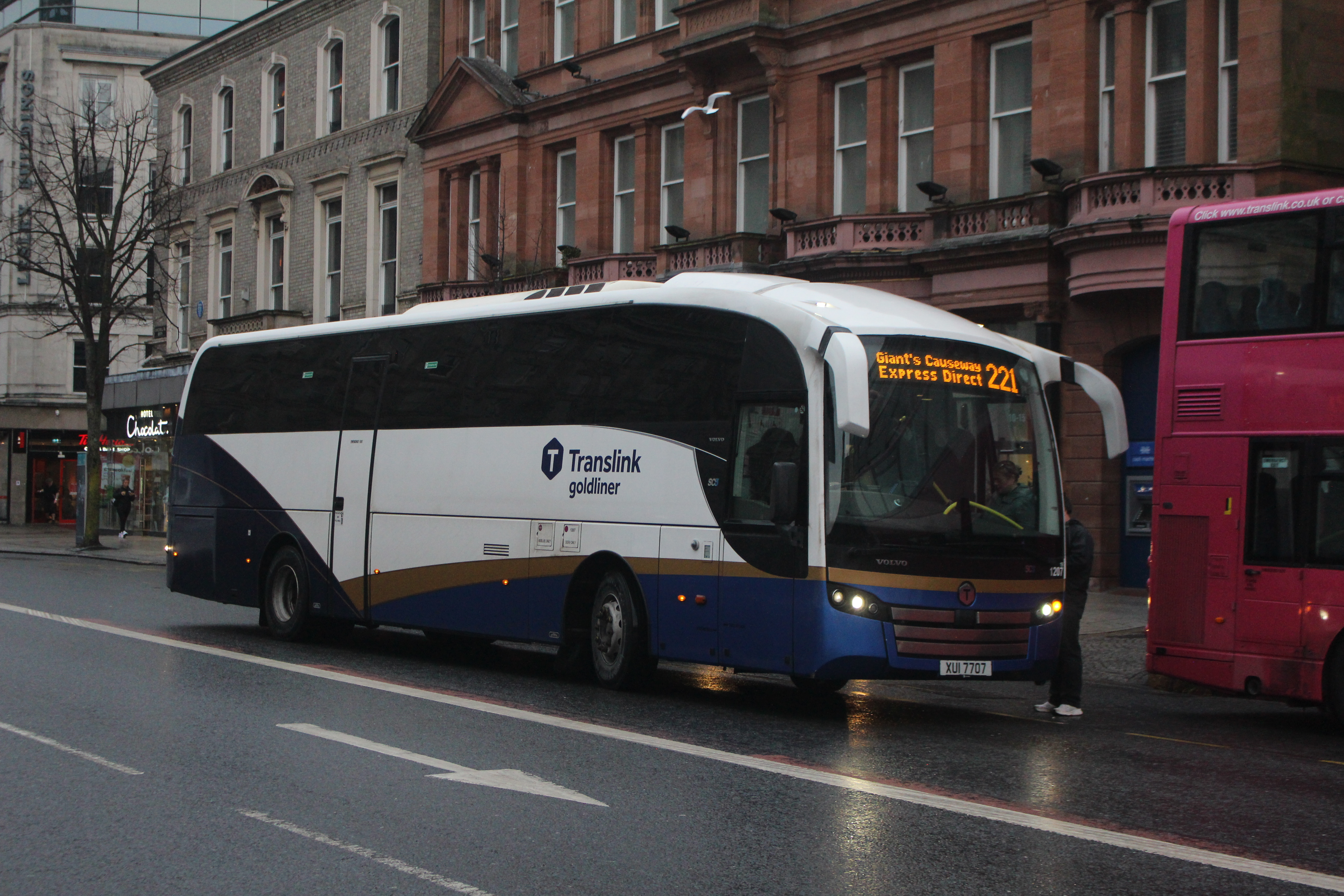
Goldliner Sunsundegui SC5 bodied Volvo B11R in Belfast in January 2025

Goldliner is the name given to the key Inter-urban bus services operated by Ulsterbus linking major cities in Northern Ireland and cross-border services into the Republic of Ireland. Amongst these are the flagship routes 212/X212 'Maiden City Flyer' from Belfast to Derry & the 'Xpress' branded routes X1 and X2 from Belfast to Dublin/Dublin Airport.

There is a cross channel (North Channel) service 923 Belfast – Glasgow and Edinburgh via Belfast Harbour and Stranraer.

=== Urby ===
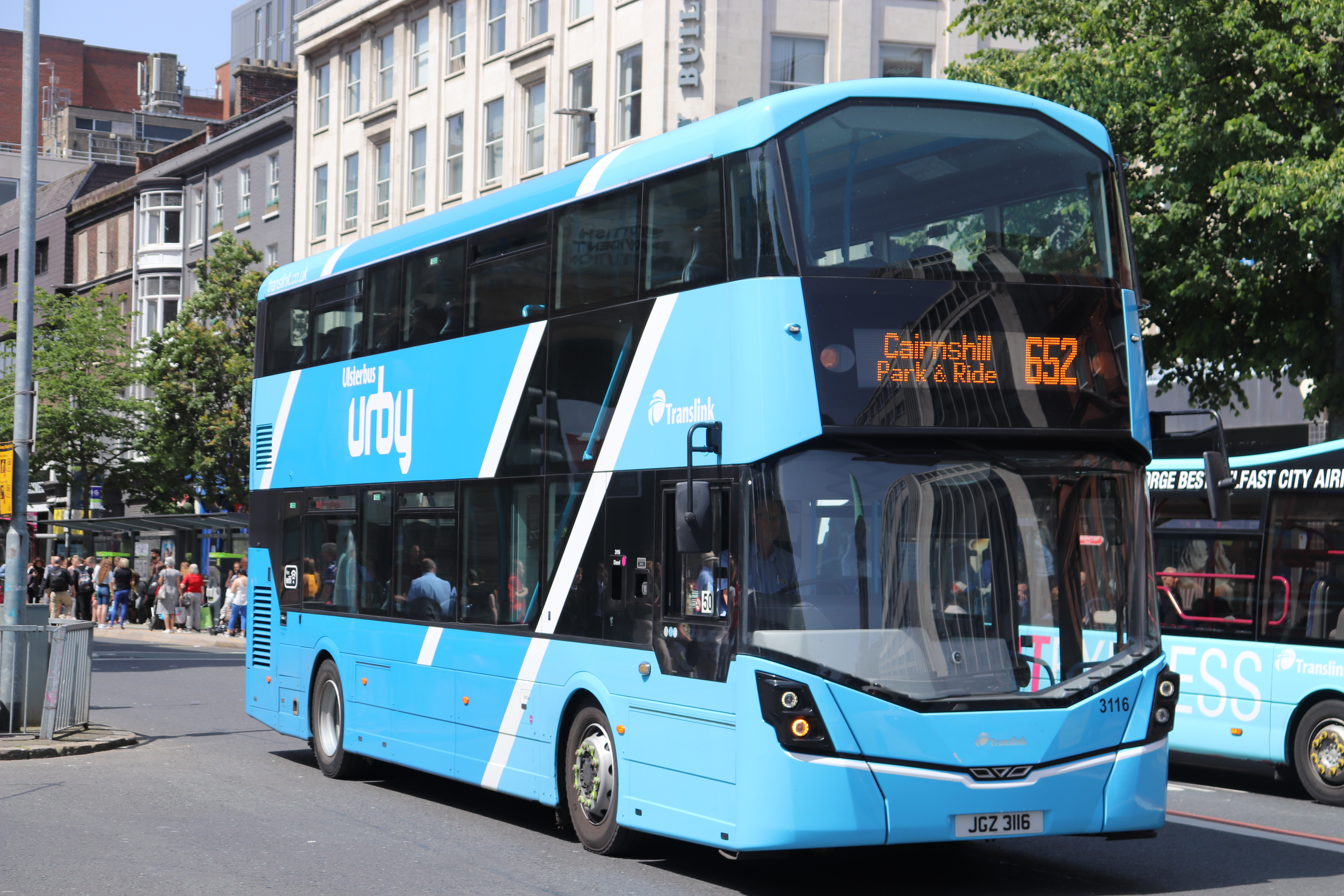
An Ulsterbus Urby Wright StreetDeck Micro Hybrid

On 7 August 2018, Translink launched the new Urby bus service. This service makes use of double deck buses built by Wrightbus and feature free Wi-Fi, leather seats and USB charging ports, with buses running on improved schedules. Two Urby networks were launched, with the first introduced along commuter routes such as in June 2018 to operate in Ballyclare, Bangor, Newtownards and Dromore, and another introduced to Ballygowan, Comber and Moneyreagh in September 2019.

=== Contract hire and tours ===
Translink provides a number of hire services to the public. Ulsterbus formerly operated "Day Tours" through Ulsterbus Tours to other parts of Northern Ireland, the Republic of Ireland and Great Britain mainly for shopping and visits to tourist attractions. Ulsterbus Tours was closed in September 2020 due to the financial impact of the COVID-19 pandemic on Translink.

== Metro ==
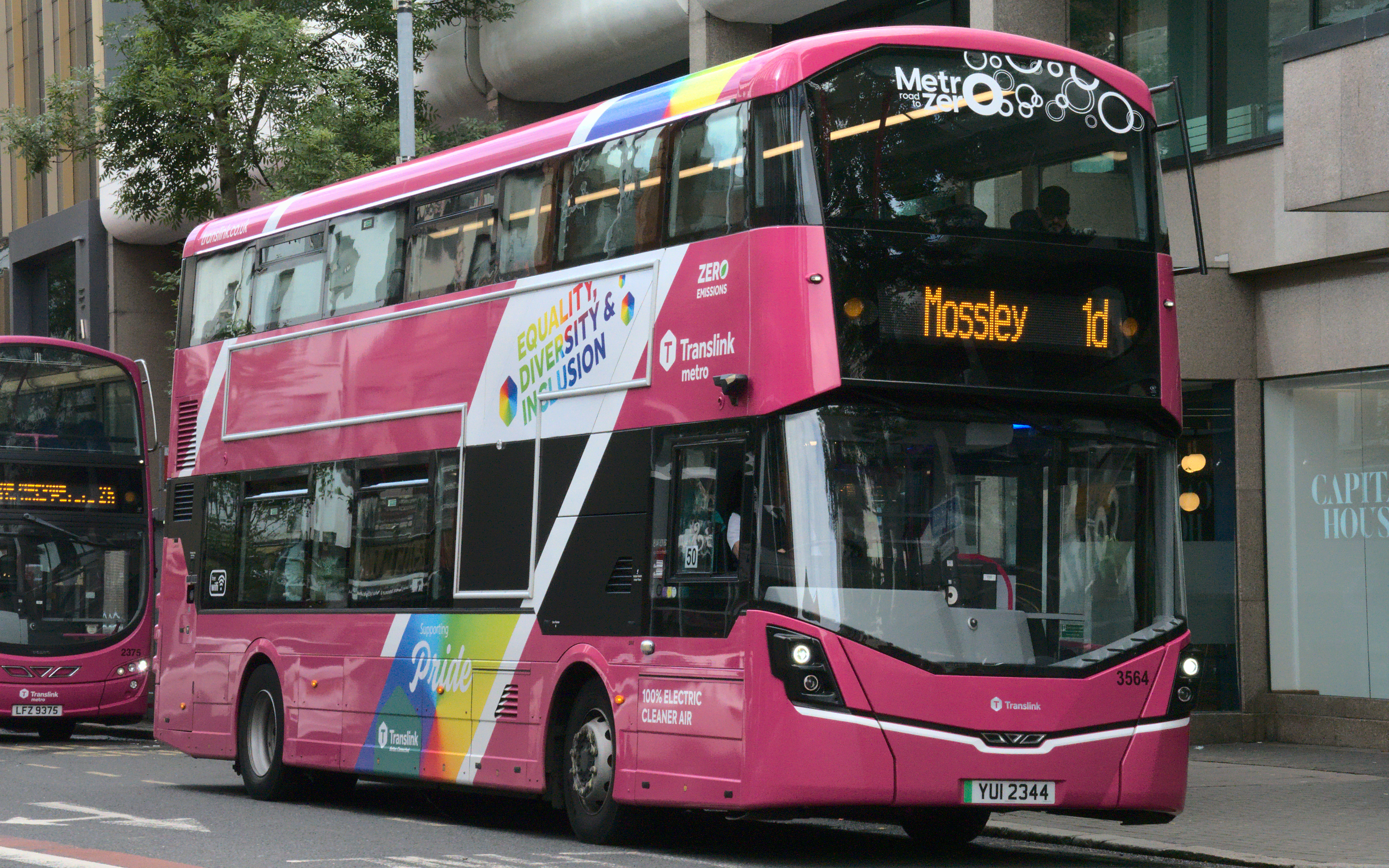
A Metro Wright StreetDeck Electroliner battery electric bus in Belfast city centre, July 2023

The Translink Metro service (previously Citybus) operates bus services within the Greater Belfast Area. Metro operates 12 bus corridors (QBCs) in Belfast, plus a number of additional routes.

The service began as the Belfast Corporation Transport Department. In 1973, these services were transferred to the Northern Ireland Transport Holding Company as Citybus Limited, becoming part of the "Translink" integrated network in 1995. In 2004, Translink/NITHC announced that Citybus would be completely rebranded & reorganised into 12 QBCs and integrated with Ulsterbus services in the Greater Belfast area. Citybus was re-branded as Metro on 7 February 2005.

== Foyle Metro ==
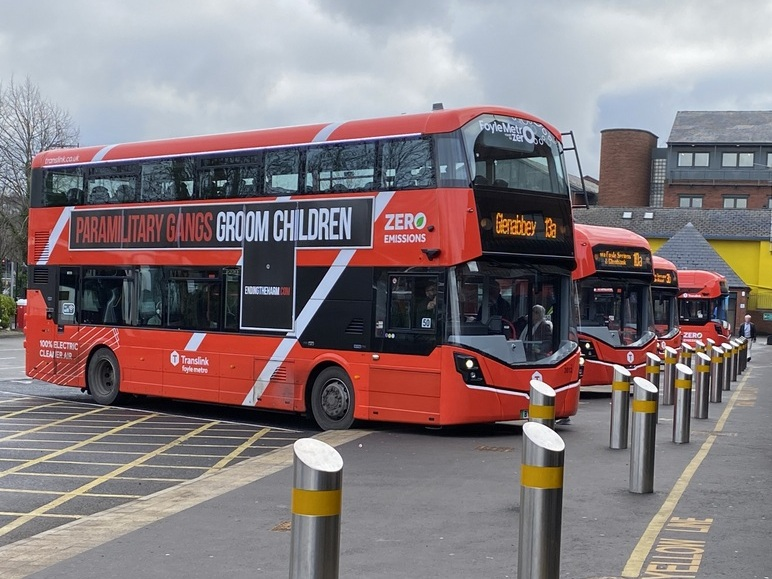
Foyle Metro battery electric buses in Derry in January 2025

Foyle Metro is a division of Translink that operates bus services in Derry. The service was opened in August 2017 following a 3m investment to update the city's bus routes and replace some of the older buses. 38 battery electric buses, including Wright GB Kites and Wright StreetDeck Electroliners, were delivered to convert the Foyle Metro fleet to zero emission in May 2023.

Foyle Metro operates across 13 key corridors from the city centre, with an additional route 14A/B/C orbiting the city's north side from Ballymagroarty to Currynierin via Altnagelvin Hospital.

== Belfast Rapid Transit System – Glider ==
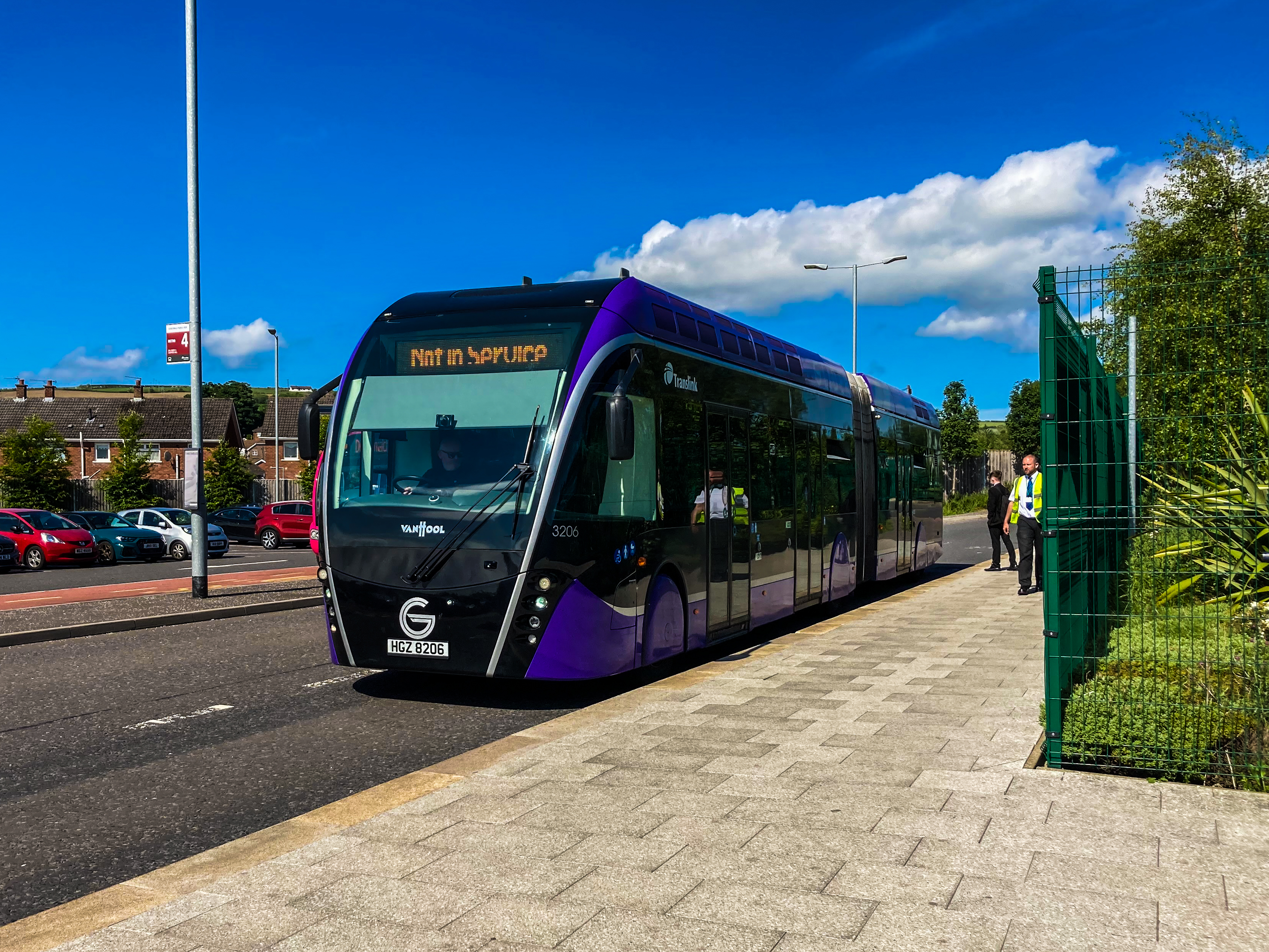
Glider Van Hool articulated bus at Dundonald Park and Ride, June 2021

The Belfast Rapid Transit System, which became operational on 3 September 2018, is a bus service run by Translink. The routes are served by 34 18-metre bendy buses, branded as Glider, built by Van Hool and specifically designed for Belfast.

They feature real time passenger information, destination announcements, CCTV, free Wi-Fi, USB charging facilities, air conditioning, and operate every 7–8 minutes throughout the working day. Route G1 links the Park and ride facility at Dundonald in East Belfast with the McKinstry Road roundabout in West Belfast whereas Route G2 connects the Titanic Quarter with the city centre.

The service is expected to help meet the future transport needs of Belfast.

== Translink Future Ticketing System ==
In 2018, Translink announced a new payments and ticketing system to be used across all of its public transport services in Northern Ireland. The scheme includes the installation of 4,500 ticket vending machines, 300 of which will be inside of train and bus stations and in Belfast City Centre, and passengers would be able to pay for journeys either using a contactless credit or debit card, or an "Oyster-Style" 'ePurse' prepaid smartcard, which can be topped up online or via a mobile app, though paper tickets will still remain available. The first part of the system had been initially rolled out alongside introduction of the Glider Bus Rapid Transit system in 2018. The new ticketing system is expected to be fully rolled out by the end of 2022, and is expected to have cost £43 million upon completion. When completed, the new fare system would become the largest of its type in the United Kingdom outside of Greater London.

== Criticisms ==
Translink received criticism in 2008 from Consumer Council Chief Executive, Eleanor Gill for providing inadequate service despite raising fares at a greater rate than inflation. She told BBC News that "passengers will rightly ask why average fare increases on Ulsterbus and Metro are above inflation while punctuality and reliability are below their target."

In February 2020 a senior civil servant issued a stark warning on the future of Northern Ireland's public transport network due to funding concerns. The civil servant said if Translink's funding problems got to the level of closing railway lines and non-profitable bus routes, any cuts would need to be agreed by Infrastructure Minister Nichola Mallon.

In 2021, Translink spent around £15,000 on a new logo design which led to public spending campaigners criticising the "costly redesign" at a time when Translink was facing serious funding pressures and cuts to services. Translink said the new design helps to "modernise and simplify the brand presence", confirming the cost of the design in response to a Freedom of Information request from Belfast Live.

== See also ==
- Enterprise Train; Cross-border Irish rail service.
- Ulster Transport Authority; Which ran rail and bus transport in Northern Ireland from 1948 until 1966.
- Northern Ireland Transport Holding Company; Government-owned body which was set up to take over the railway and bus services of the UTA.
