= Video City =

Video City may refer to:

- Video City (Australia), a former Australian home video rental business
- Video City (film), a 2023 Philippine fantasy romantic comedy film
- Video City (Northern Ireland), a former Northern Irish DVD rental retailer
- Video City (Philippines), a former Philippine home video rental business
