= Video City (Northern Ireland) =

Defunct Northern Irish DVD rental retailer (1995–2008)

- Industry: Video rental
- Founded: 1995
- Defunct: 2008
- Headquarters: Northern Ireland
- Area served: Northern Ireland
- Website: Video City

Video City was a DVD rental retailer in Northern Ireland with 24 stores across the province. The chain also had tanning facilities, such as "The Tanning Studio", and also was a franchisee of Mauds Ice Cream.

The chain's main competitor was Xtra-vision.
