= Foyle Metro =

Bus network in Derry, County Londonderry, Northern Ireland

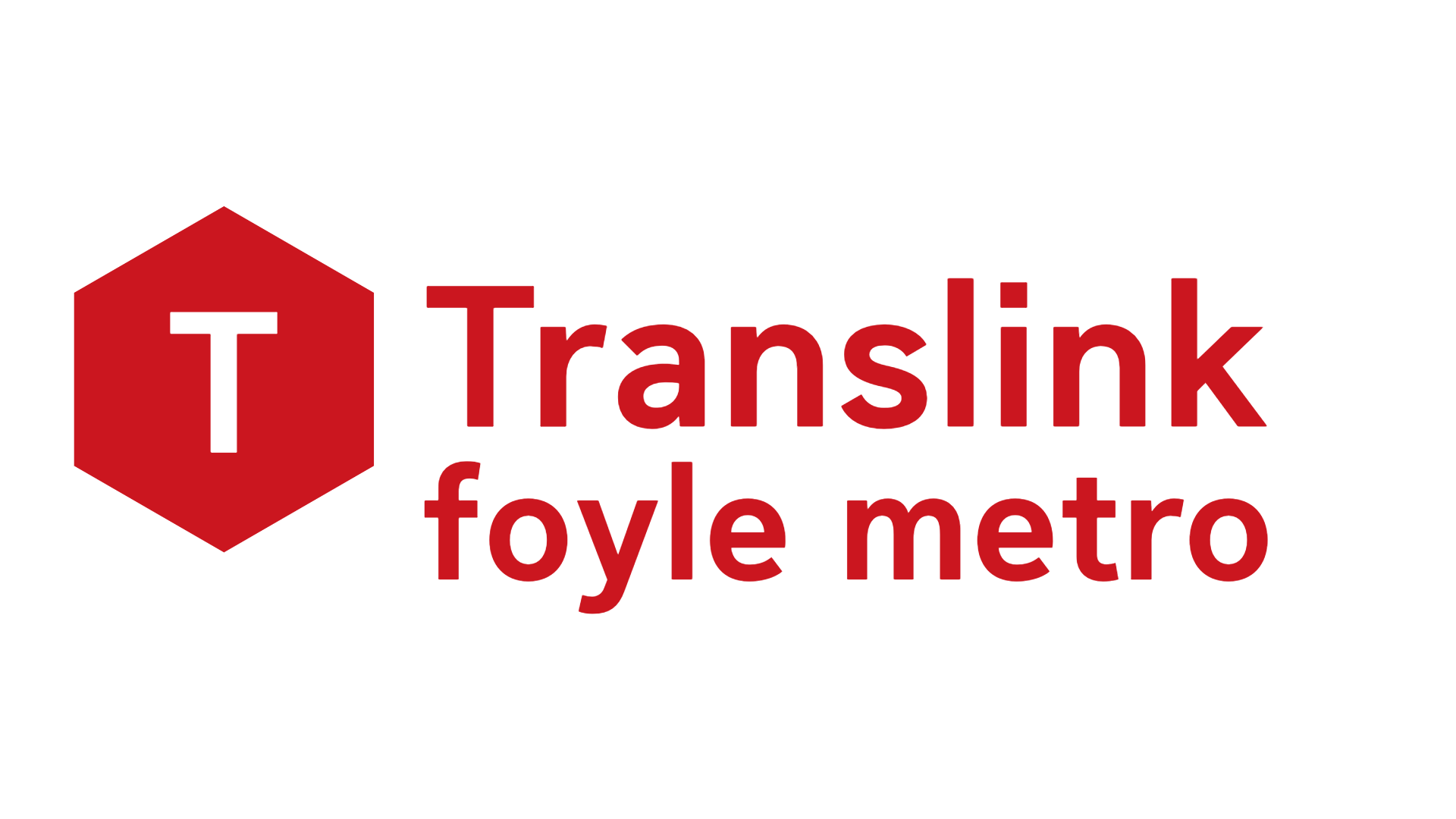

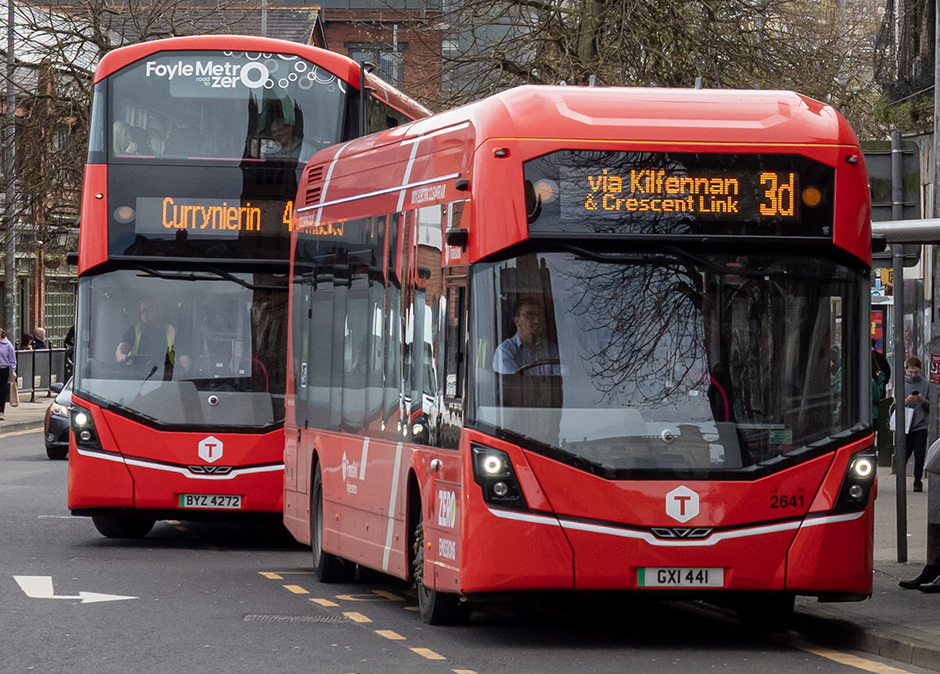
- Wright GB Kite Electroliner and Wright StreetDeck Electroliner battery electric buses on Foyle Street in April 2026
- Formerly: Ulsterbus Foyle
- Parent: Translink
- Founded: 2006 (as Ulsterbus Foyle); 2017 (as Foyle Metro)
- Service area: Derry
- Service type: bus services bus rapid transit
- Routes: 39
- Depots: 1
- Fleet: 43 (August 2025)
- Daily ridership: 5480
- Annual ridership: 2,000,000

Foyle Metro is the trading name for Translink city bus services that operate in Derry. It is a subsidiary of the Northern Ireland Transport Holding Company, within the common management structure of Translink, along with Metro, Ulsterbus and Northern Ireland Railways.

== History ==
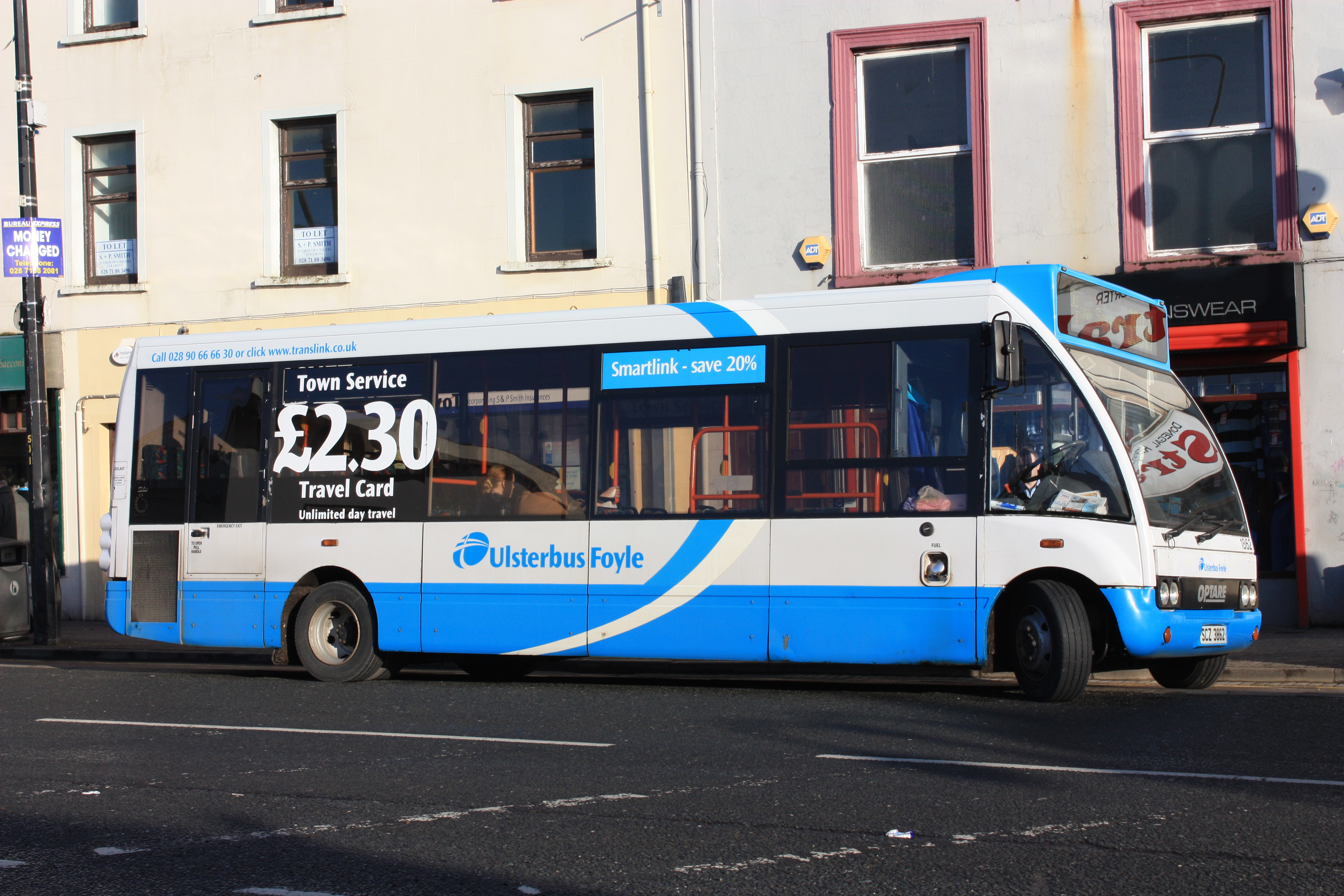
An Ulsterbus Foyle Optare Solo in 2010

Prior to the formation of Ulsterbus Foyle, Ulsterbus ran several 'Derry City Services' across the city. However, in 2006 local city services received a new identity known as Ulsterbus Foyle, with logos on buses featuring a new wordmark, 'Foyle'. Translink also introduced a new 'Day fare', with bus services in the city being capped at £2. These services were the first to carry letters within their service 'number'. They were initially numbered FY1-FY14.

Initially, Ulsterbus Foyle routes were served by Wright Renown bodied Volvo B10BLEs, Alexander Ultra bodied Volvo B10Ls, Optare Solos and Alexander ALX400 bodied Volvo B7TLs. Between 2007 and 2010, Translink purchased eight new Wright Eclipse Gemini bodied Volvo B9TLs to replace the oldest ALX400s operating in the city. By 2011, the city's fleet of Alexander Ultra bodied Volvo B10Ls were withdrawn and replaced with new Wright Solar bodied Scania L94UBs.

In 2014 Ulsterbus Foyle launched a new route, FY16 linking Derry with the village of Culmore. The route was initially launched to fill the gap in service by the infrequent Swilly Bus services to the Inishowen Peninsula but eventually became an hourly service following the liquidation of Swilly Bus in late 2014. Throughout 2014 and 2015, Translink replaced its remaining Wright Renowns with new Optare Solo SRs.

=== Foyle Metro ===
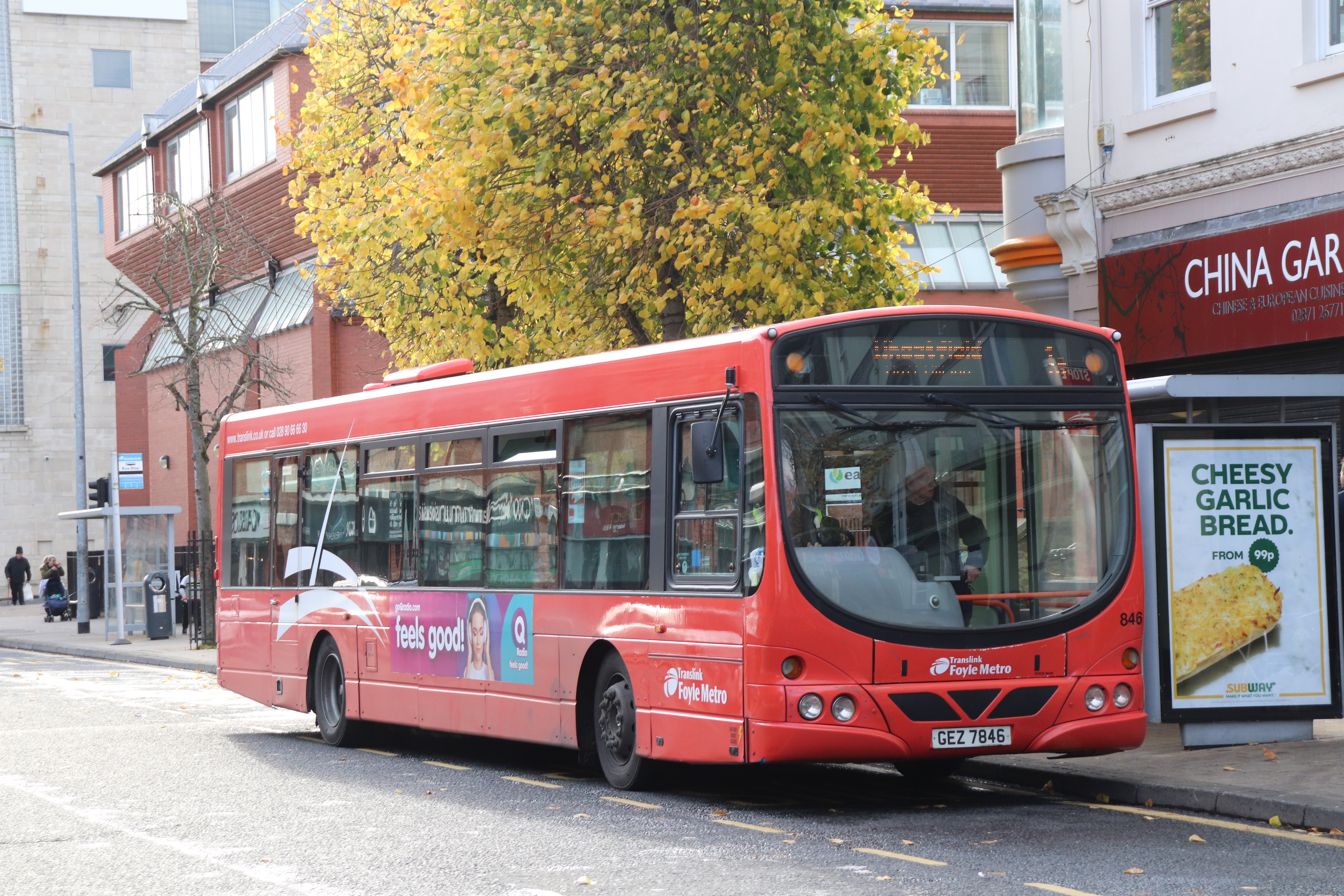
A Foyle Metro Wright Solar bodied Scania L94UB on Foyle Street

In 2017, Translink announced that Ulsterbus Foyle would be rebranded as 'Foyle Metro', representing a more than £3 million investment in the city, consisting of 19 new buses. A further 20 buses were refurbished as part of the investment, including seven Scania Solars and eight Wright Eclipse Gemini-bodied Volvo B9TLs, painted in a brand new red livery. The new service also saw the withdrawal of the city's remaining ALX400s. The new service operates on a streamlined network of 14 bus corridors, including a new 'cross-city' route 14a/b/c, running from Springtown-Curryneirn via Altnagelvin Area Hospital, avoiding the city centre.

In 2021 the Foyle Metro logo was rebranded as part of a wider rebrand of the Translink system.

In 2023, Translink announced a £33 million investment into Foyle Metro. Including the full replacement of the Foyle Metro fleet, with all existing buses to be replaced by a fleet of 38 battery-electric vehicles, consisting of 28 Wright GB Kite Electroliners and 10 Wright StreetDeck Electroliners. 22 new charging units were also installed at Translink's Pennyburn depot in Derry to allow 44 buses to be charged each night.

In 2024, Translink purchased an additional three Wright GB Kite Electroliners. Translink also announced new late night weekend services, operating on three routes across the city, 3n/7n/12n. In February 2025, Foyle Metro celebrated three million passengers since the launch of their new electric bus fleet 18 months prior.

== Services ==
Foyle Metro operates 13 Quality Bus Corridors (QBCs), with an additional route 14A/B/C orbiting the city's north side from Springtown to Curryniern via Altnagelvin Hospital. Foyle Metro operates from Foyle Street Bus Station in the centre of Derry city, also providing services from Derry/Londonderry Train Station, including up to 20 shuttle services per day to the City Centre. Most routes operate within Derry, however several buses extend beyond the city to Drumahoe, Newbuildings and Culmore. Foyle Metro is notable for having an international service, the 1a from Foyle Street stop in Derry, to Wheatfield stop in Muff, in the Republic of Ireland, via Culmore Point stop in Culmore. In September 2025, the Waterside network was reworked with routes 2A/B now serving Rosses Gate estate, routes 3A/B/C now serving Crescent Link Retail Park and new routes 4D serving Altnagelvin Hospital & Curryneirin and 3D serving Drumahoe Park & Ride.

== Fleet ==
As of 2025, Foyle Metro operates a fleet of 43 buses from one depot (Pennyburn), consisting of 33 Wright GB Kite Electroliners and 11 Wright StreetDeck Electroliners. All buses are fitted with enhanced passenger information LCD Screens, on-board audio-visual announcements, USB charging and contactless ticketing. During peak times, some Foyle Metro services are operated by sister company Ulsterbus' fleet of StreetDecks.

At the time of launch in 2017, Foyle Metro operated a fleet of 33 buses, including fifteen new Optare Versas and three Optare Solo SRs, alongside seven Scania Solars and eight Wright Eclipse Gemini-bodied Volvo B9TLs retained from Ulsterbus Foyle.

== See also ==
- List of bus operators of the United Kingdom
