= Werner Heubeck =

German-British transport executive

Werner Heubeck CBE
- Werner Heubeck behind the wheel of an Ulsterbus Leyland Tiger on the day of his retirement, 1988.
- Born: Werner Wolfgang Heubeck; 24 October 1923; Nuremberg, Germany
- Died: 19 October 2009 (aged 85); Shetland, Scotland
- Citizenship: British
- Occupation: Bus manager
- Known for: Managing director of Ulsterbus and Citybus
- Spouse: Monica Heubeck (m. 1949; died 2009)
- Children: 3

Werner Wolfgang Heubeck (24 October 1923 – 19 October 2009) was a German–British transport executive who was managing director of the Northern Ireland transport companies Ulsterbus and Citybus.

== Early life and military service ==
Heubeck was born in Nuremberg, Germany in 1923, the son of an engineer in the city's gas works. In 1942, aged 19, he was a member of the Hitler Youth, and was conscripted into the Luftwaffe as a soldier and engineer in the Hermann Göring division. He was initially posted to anti-invasion duties in western France, then moved to Italy, before being assigned to the Afrika Korps in the last stages of the North African Campaign. The transport ships carrying Heubeck to Africa were attacked by air and sunk 4.5 miles (7.2 km) from the African coast. Heubeck swam to Cap Bon, also managing to rescue some of his colleagues, of whom 60 of 550 survived the attack.

== Post-World War II ==
Captured shortly after reaching Tunisia, Heubeck was sent to the United States on the last prisoner of war convoy to a POW camp at Fort Polk, Louisiana. He was repatriated in 1946, and returned to Nuremberg to rebuild his family home. After a brief period working for the United States Army, Heubeck obtained work as a translator and proof-reader at the Nuremberg Trials held in his home town. It was at the Nuremberg Trials that Heubeck met his future wife, Monica, a Welsh translator who had worked at Bletchley Park during the war. Despite Heubeck's German heritage and military service, he and Monica gained permission to marry and settle in the UK, which they did in 1949. Initially settling in London, Heubeck was offered work by London Transport as a station worker on the Underground, but as he did not want to spend all day beneath the ground he and his wife instead relocated to her native Wales, where he got a job as a factory labourer at the British Nylon Spinners works in Pontypool. Heubeck was naturalised as a British citizen in 1954, at the time he was described as a "Development Assistant" and was living in Govilon, near Abergavenny.

== Ulsterbus and Citybus ==
By 1957, Heubeck was working as a manager for Alex Pirie & Sons, a paper mill in Aberdeen. In 1965, he noticed an advertisement for the position of managing director for buses in Northern Ireland, and successfully applied for the job, preparing for the interview by taking a day trip to Ulster and speaking to the bus manager in Aberdeen.

The Ulster Transport Authority (UTA), as it was then known, had been making serious losses, and in 1967, Heubeck headed up a major revamping of the bus side of the organisation, which was rebranded as Ulsterbus. Staffing was cut, including the phasing out of conductors, and timetables were rescheduled. He succeeded in running Ulsterbus and Citybus profitably at a time when conventional wisdom said that public transport could never be run profitably. Unlike many managers at the time he eschewed ostentation—sharing the services of a secretary with his Chief Engineer, keeping filing to a minimum and carrying this emphasis on economic working throughout the organisation.

In addition, Heubeck's tenure at Ulsterbus coincided with the height of The Troubles in Northern Ireland during the 1970s and 1980s, with public transport being a prime target of the Provisional IRA's bombing campaign. Heubeck was well known at the time for personally boarding buses and removing bombs himself to keep the buses running to schedule.

== Retirement ==
Heubeck retired in 1988, after 23 years at Ulsterbus. He moved to near the village of Gleno in County Antrim where he produced handmade artefacts and furniture for local churches. He later moved to Shetland where one of his three sons (Martin Heubeck) worked as an ornithologist. Heubeck died on 19 October 2009, aged 85, a month after the death of his wife Monica. He had been living with cancer for several years.

== Honours ==
Heubeck was appointed Officer of the Order of the British Empire (OBE) in the 1977 Queen's Birthday Honours. In the Birthday Honours of 1988, the year of his retirement from Ulsterbus, he was promoted to Commander of the Order of the British Empire (CBE).
