= Transport Act (Northern Ireland) 1967 =

Act of the Parliament of Northern Ireland

Transport Act (Northern Ireland) 1967 (Note: Section 83(1).)
- Act of Parliament
- Parliament of Northern Ireland
- Long title: An Act to make further provision for the re-organisation of public transport and otherwise to amend the law relating to transport; and for purposes connected therewith.
- Citation: 1967 c. 37 (N.I.)
- Territorial extent: Northern Ireland

Dates
- Royal assent: 14 December 1967
- Commencement: (Note: Section 83(2).)

Other legislation
- Amended by: Northern Ireland Assembly Disqualification Act 1975; Road Service Licensing (Community Licences) Regulations (Northern Ireland) 2013; Public Service Vehicles (International Passenger Services) Regulations (Northern Ireland) 2019; International Road Passenger Transport (Amendment) (Northern Ireland) (EU Exit) Regulations 2019; Transport Act (Northern Ireland) 2011; Road Passenger Transport (Qualifications of Operators) Regulations (Northern Ireland) 2014; Insolvency (Northern Ireland) Order 2005 (Consequential Amendments) Order (Northern Ireland) 2015; Road Traffic (Northern Ireland) Order 2007; Departments (Transfer of Functions) Order (Northern Ireland) 2016; Decimal Currency Act 1969; Insolvency (Northern Ireland) Order 2005 (Consequential Amendments) Order (Northern Ireland) 2015; Insolvency (Northern Ireland) Order 2005; Debt Relief Act (Northern Ireland) 2010 (Consequential Amendments) Order (Northern Ireland) 2016; Perjury (Northern Ireland) Order 1979; Forgery and Counterfeiting Act 1981; Fines and Penalties (Northern Ireland) Order 1984; Financial Provisions (Northern Ireland) Order 1983; Transport (Northern Ireland) Order 1977; Companies Act 2006 (Consequential Amendments etc) Order 2008; Appropriation (No. 3) (Northern Ireland) Order 1984; Roads (Northern Ireland) Order 1993; Road Traffic Regulation (Northern Ireland) Order 1997; Railways Clauses Consolidation Act 1845; Railway and Canal Traffic Act 1854; Railways Clauses Act 1863; Penalty Fares (Increase) Order (Northern Ireland) 2016
- Repealed by: Road Traffic (Northern Ireland) Order 1995; General Consumer Council (Northern Ireland) Order 1984; Transport (Northern Ireland) Order 1977; Transport (Amendment) (Northern Ireland) Order 1990; Road Traffic, Transport and Roads (Northern Ireland) Order 1984; Transport (Northern Ireland) Order 1977; Goods Vehicles (Licensing of Operators) Act (Northern Ireland) 2010; Smoking (Northern Ireland) Order 2006

Status: Amended

Revised text of statute as amended

Text of the Transport Act (Northern Ireland) 1967 as in force today (including any amendments) within the United Kingdom, from legislation.gov.uk.

The Transport Act (Northern Ireland) 1967 (c. 37 (N.I.)) is an act of the Parliament of Northern Ireland concerning transport.

== Background ==
In the decades leading up to the act, there had been a reduction in the length of Northern Ireland's railway network from 900 miles to 210 miles.

== Contents ==
The act established the Northern Ireland Transport Holdings Company which trades as Translink a government-owned body which manages trains and buses in Northern Ireland. The act established NITHC as a replacement to the Ulster Transport Authority.

The operations of Belfast Central Railways were absorbed by Northern Ireland Railways, under the act.

== Implementation ==
Ulsterbus began operating in April 1967. Northern Ireland Railways was established on 1 April 1968. Citybus began operating on 2 April 1973.

The name "Translink" was adopted in 1996.
