= Ulsterbus =

Bus operator in Northern Ireland

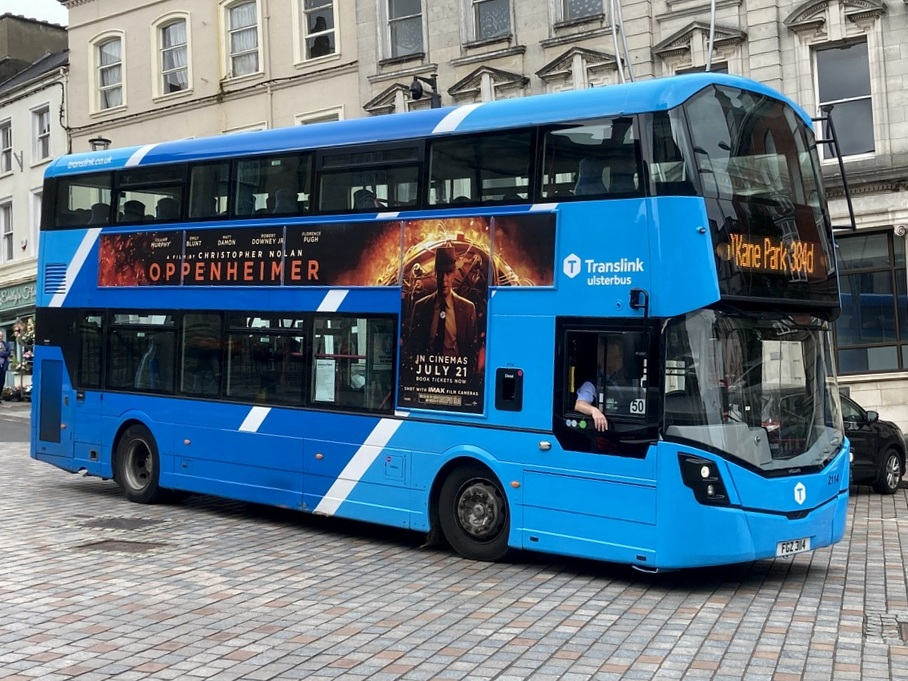
- Wright Gemini 3 bodied Volvo B5TL in Omagh in July 2023
- Parent: Translink
- Founded: 1967
- Headquarters: Milewater Road, Belfast, Northern Ireland
- Locale: Northern Ireland
- Service area: Northern Ireland; Republic of Ireland (via Cross Border Services)
- Service type: Bus service, Coach
- Alliance: Bus Éireann
- Stations: 22
- Fleet: ~1,100
- Operator: Translink
- Website: www.translink.co.uk/Services/Ulsterbus-Service-Page/

Ulsterbus is a public transport operator in Northern Ireland and operates bus services outside Belfast. It is part of Translink, the brand name for the subsidiary operating companies of the Northern Ireland Transport Holding Company, which also includes Northern Ireland Railways and Metro Belfast.

== History ==
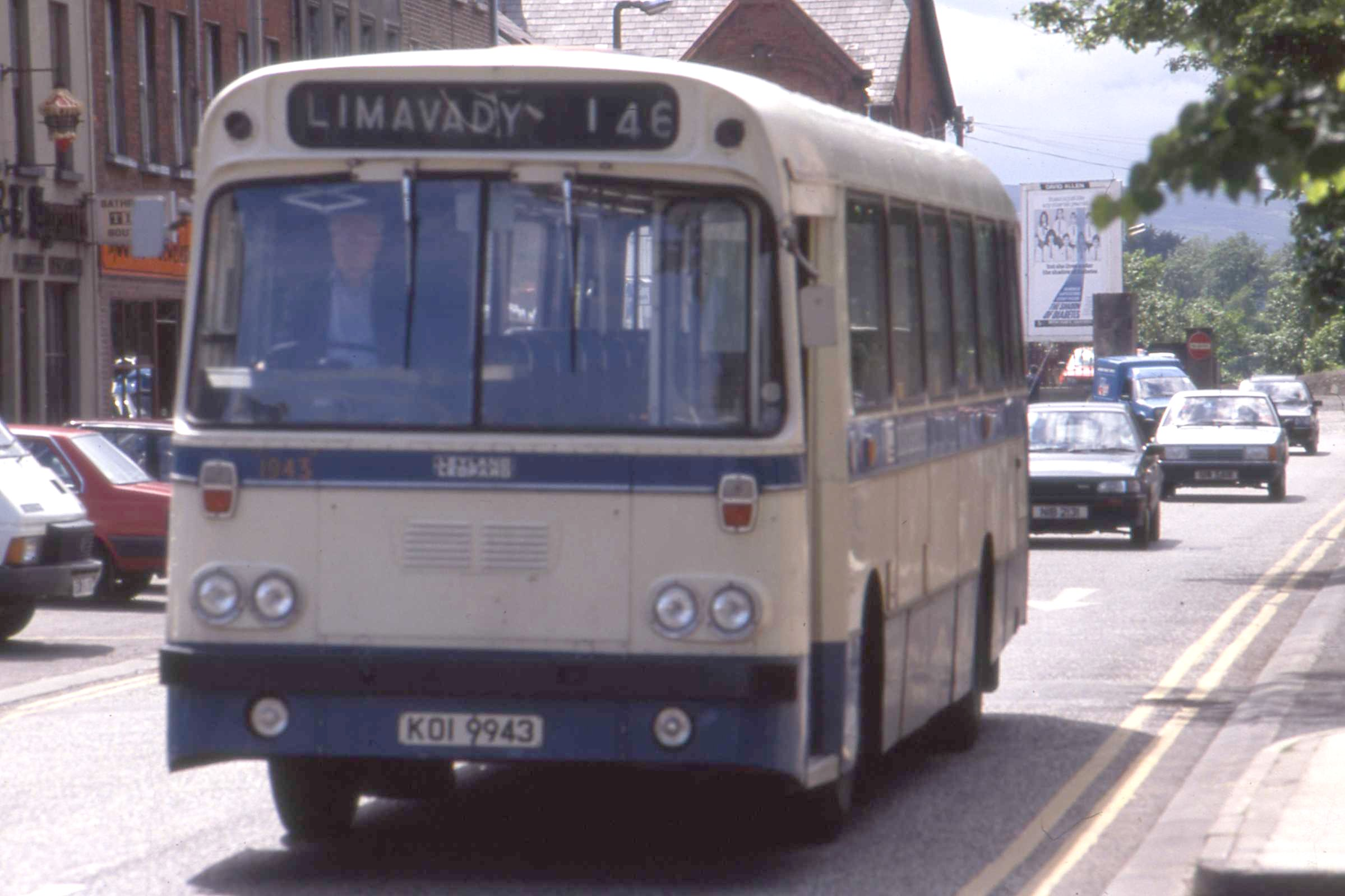
Alexander (Belfast) bodied Leyland Leopard in Limavady in June 1990

Ulsterbus was founded in 1967 with the creation of the Northern Ireland Transport Holding Company, replacing the former Ulster Transport Authority. The founding of Ulsterbus coincided with the beginnings of The Troubles, a conflict which intensified throughout the 1970s and 1980s and often saw Ulsterbus buses and employees caught in the crossfire. Drivers would often face hijackings, assaults and robberies while operating Ulsterbus services, their buses being turned into burning barricades or occasionally being bombed. Four Ulsterbus employees were killed in the 1972 Bloody Friday bombings when an IRA bomb exploded at the Oxford Street bus station. In total, 17 employees from both Ulsterbus and Citybus were killed during The Troubles, with 1,484 buses in total being maliciously destroyed from 1964 to the signing of the Good Friday Agreement in 1998.

Werner Heubeck was the first managing director of both Ulsterbus and Citybus, managing both companies throughout The Troubles from his appointment in 1965 until his retirement in 1988. A former Luftwaffe conscript, Heubeck became known for carrying bombs off buses and for making Northern Ireland's buses profitable and running to schedule despite the security situation, and received both an OBE in 1977 and a CBE on his retirement in 1988.

The Northern Ireland Transport Holding Company was rebranded to Translink in 1996. Ulsterbus and Citybus, as well as Northern Ireland's rail services, were integrated into Translink and were subsequently rebranded. Translink have built and refurbished a number of bus stations served by Ulsterbus and have invested in a fully low-floor bus fleet, as well as introducing brands such as the Foyle Metro.

== Services ==
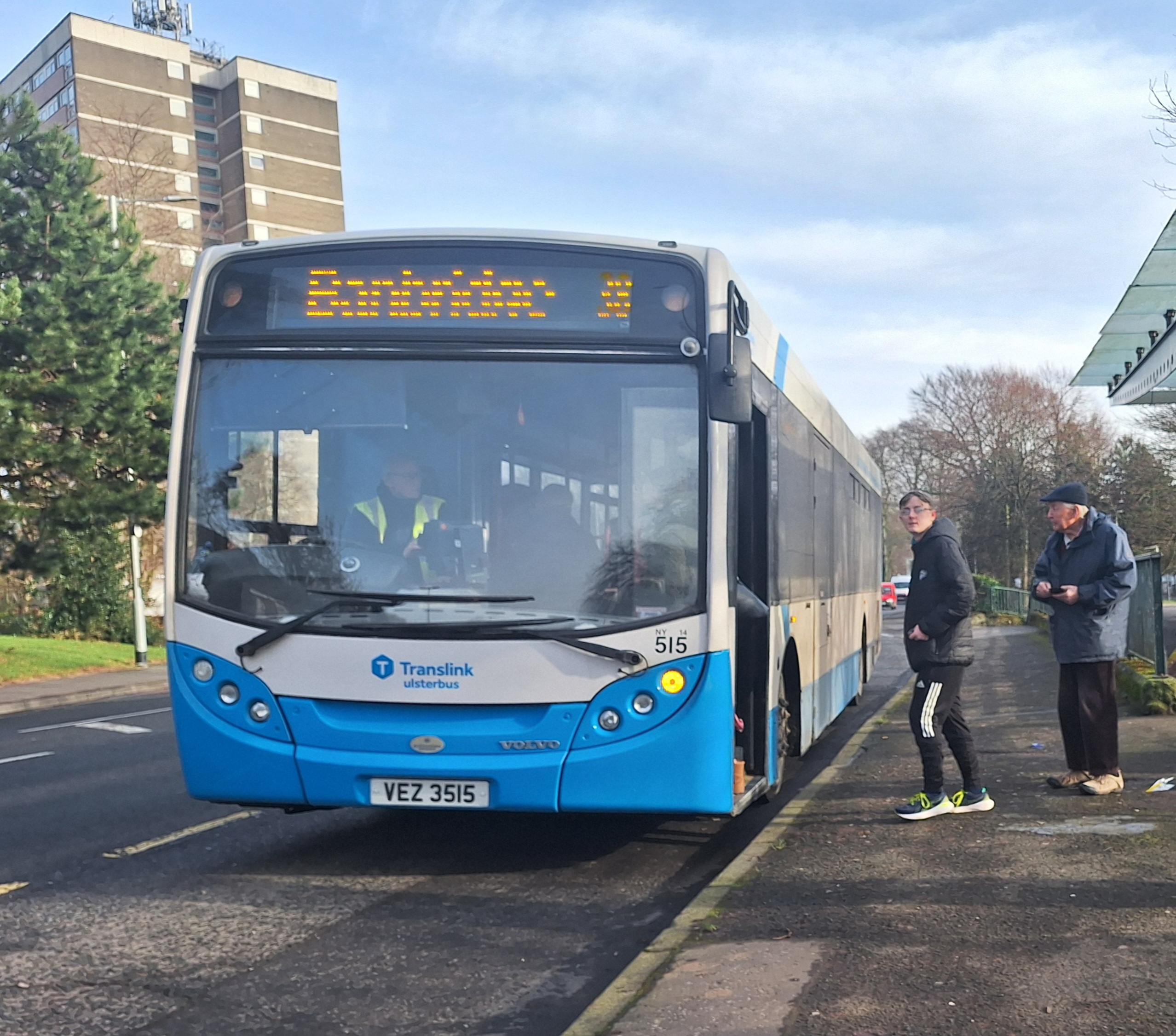
Alexander Dennis Enviro300 bodied Volvo B7RLE in Derriaghy in February 2024

Ulsterbus is responsible for most of the province-wide bus services in Northern Ireland. It operates 1,100 buses and twenty-two bus stations, several of which, such as those at Belfast Grand Central and Bangor, form integrated transport interchanges with Northern Ireland Railways stations.

Ulsterbus, as part of Translink, is charged with transporting over 55,000 children per day across Northern Ireland to school. Every July and August, around 250 vehicles are usually de-taxed. This is because not as many are needed for service due to schools finishing for summer holidays.

=== Goldliner ===
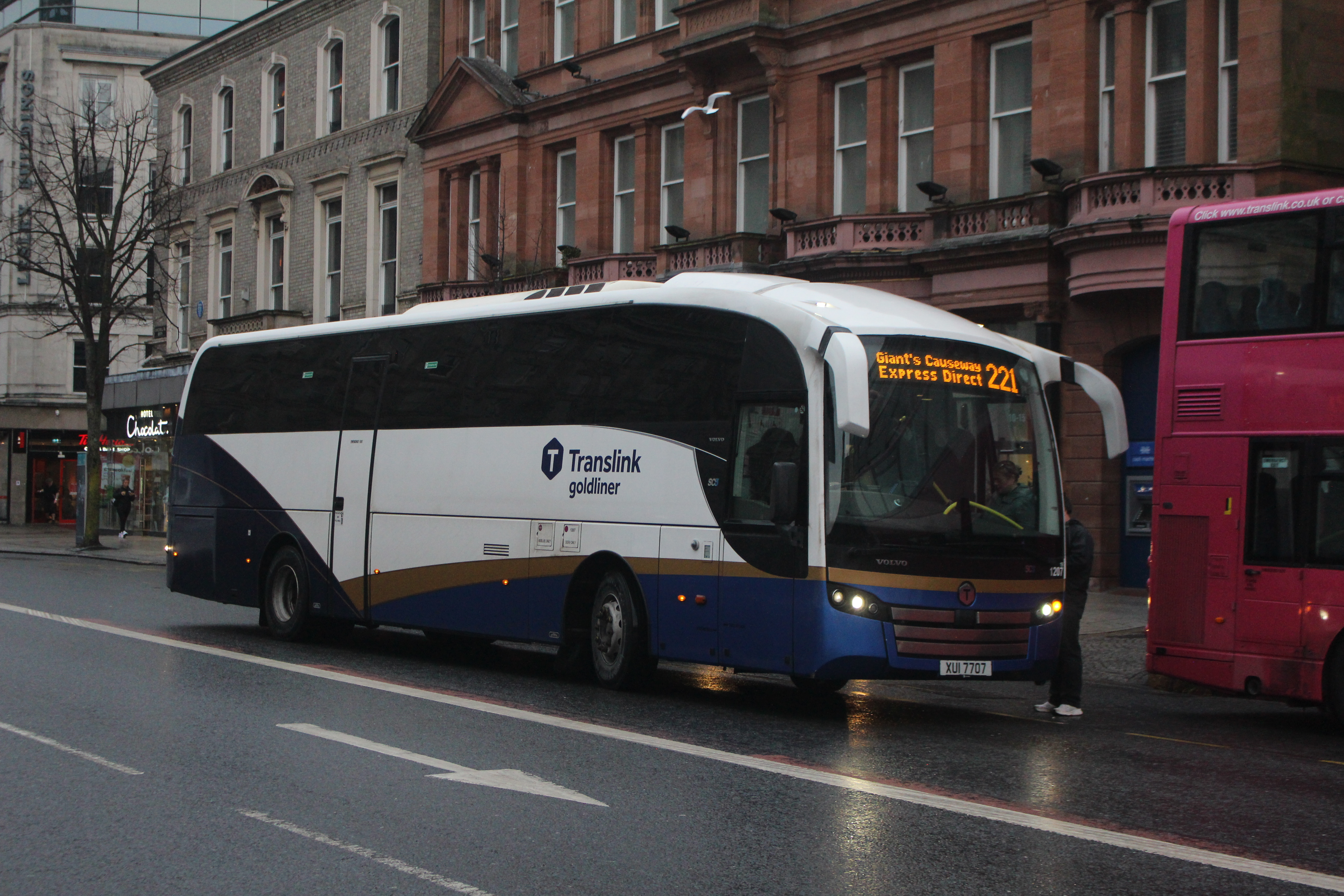
Goldliner Sunsundegui SC5 bodied Volvo B11R in Belfast in January 2025

Goldliner is the name given to the inter-city express bus services operated by Ulsterbus. Originally launched as the 'Northern Ireland Express' in the 1970s, these services were rebranded to 'Goldline' in 1990, with the Belfast-Derry express service relaunched as the 'Maiden City Flyer' with eight new coaches in 1991. This service has seen major expansion over the years: Belfast-Derry 212 service went from a thrice daily service in 1990 to half-hourly frequency, and many services have been expanded and introduced. In 2021, these services were rebranded again to 'Goldliner' in line with the wider rebranding of Translink.

Goldliner services are primarily operated from Belfast to major destinations in Northern Ireland, as well as 'Xpress' branded cross-border Goldline Express Services X1 (previously service 200) to Dublin (via Dublin Airport). This service was worked jointly with Bus Éireann's service X1 (previously service 001) until December 2020, after which Bus Éireann withdrew their X1. There is also a X2 operating express between Belfast and Dublin Airport without any intermediate stops between them.

There are also a number of cross-channel (North Channel) services to Britain, operated in partnership with National Express under the Eurolines banner.

=== Foyle Metro ===
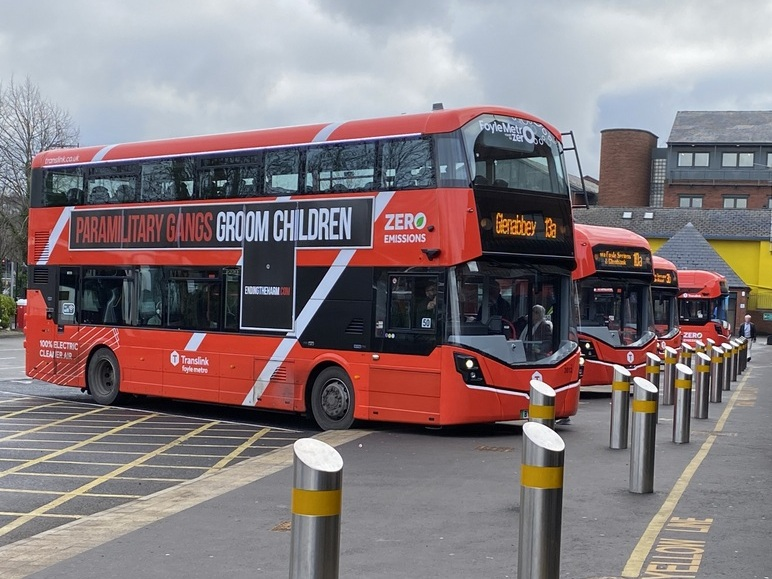
Foyle Metro battery electric buses in Derry in January 2025

For many years, Derry's internal bus network was operated as Ulsterbus's Derry City Services. The network was relaunched as Ulsterbus Foyle on 4 September 2006 following a review and expansion of the city's bus routes and replacement of many of the city's older buses.

Ulsterbus Foyle was later rebranded as Foyle Metro on 1 September 2017, with buses branded in a deep red livery. The rebranded service, representing an investment of over £3 million, included 19 brand new buses delivered and many others refurbished to operates across 14 quality bus corridors with new timetables.

In 2022, £30 million of funding from the Department for Infrastructure was acquired for the purchase of 38 battery electric buses, as well as charging equipment to be installed at the Foyle Metro's Pennyburn garage. The buses, ten being Wright StreetDeck Electroliner double-decks and 28 being Wright GB Kite Electroliner single-decks, were delivered in May 2023, with the fleet rolled out onto city services to replace existing diesel buses from August onwards, enabling the Foyle Metro fleet to be completely zero-emission.

=== Ulsterbus Tours ===
Ulsterbus previously operated a holiday coaching arm named 'Ulsterbus Tours', operating "day tours" to other parts of Northern Ireland, the Republic of Ireland and across the Irish Sea to Great Britain, mainly for shopping and visits to tourist attractions. Coaches could also be hired for sporting events such as Old Firm derbies and racing events such as the Cheltenham Gold Cup. Ulsterbus Tours was closed in September 2020 due to the financial impact of the COVID-19 pandemic on Translink.

=== Urby ===
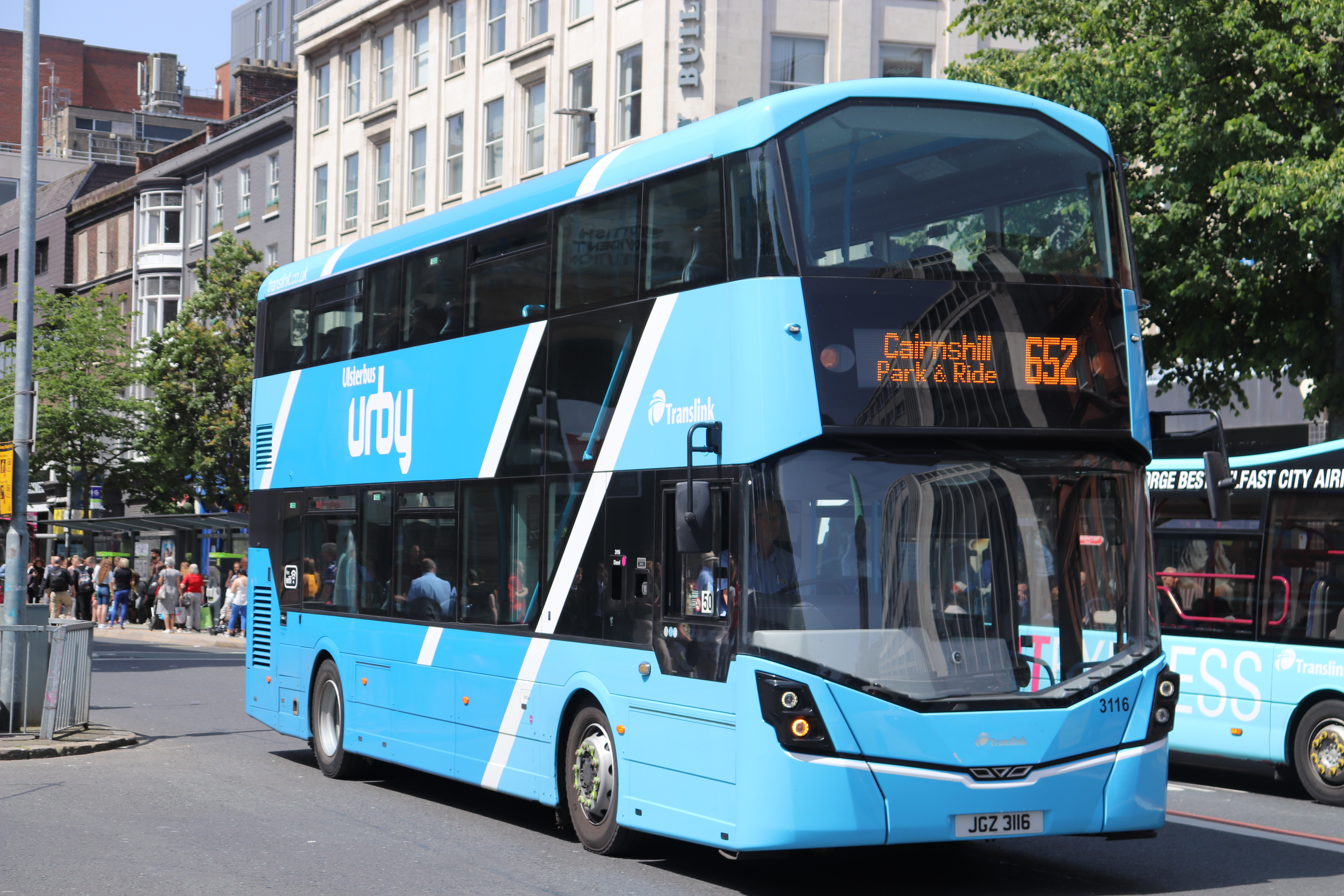
Urby Wright StreetDeck Micro Hybrid in Belfast in June 2019

The Ulsterbus Urby service is an upgraded bus service offering USB charging, faster journeys, WiFi and leather seating, initially launched with 28 new Wright double decker buses in June 2018 to operate in Ballyclare, Bangor, Newtownards and Dromore. In September 2019, routes serving Ballygowan, Comber and Moneyreagh were upgraded to Urby routes with an investment of seven new buses.

== Incidents ==
In December 2015, a single-decker bus crashed into Strangford Lough after colliding with a wall on the Portaferry Road near Newtownards. No passengers were on board at the time and the driver of the bus sustained only minor injuries. The bus was recovered and put back onto land a few hours later.

Two Ulsterbus Goldline coaches have suffered engine fires while in service; a coach bound for Belfast caught fire outside of Lurgan, County Armagh in November 2016, while another caught fire on the M2 in County Antrim in July 2021, which the company states was caused by "accidental ignition".

An Urby bus was hijacked and set alight by "masked men" on the morning of 1 November 2021 in Newtownards. The bus had recently entered service in the Bowtown estate when hijackers held the driver at gunpoint and "muttered something about the (Northern Ireland) protocol" before setting the bus alight. No passengers were on board at the time, but the bus was totally destroyed and the driver left "badly shaken". The attack was widely condemned by members of the Northern Ireland Assembly and all buses to the town were briefly suspended.

A double-decker Urby school bus carrying 43 pupils from Strangford College overturned in a field near Carrowdore on 7 October 2024 after colliding with a post. The Northern Ireland Ambulance Service declared a major incident at the scene due to the number of ambulances required to attend, with the incident resulting in four pupils being taken to hospital and the rest onboard being released with minor injuries.

== Fleet ==
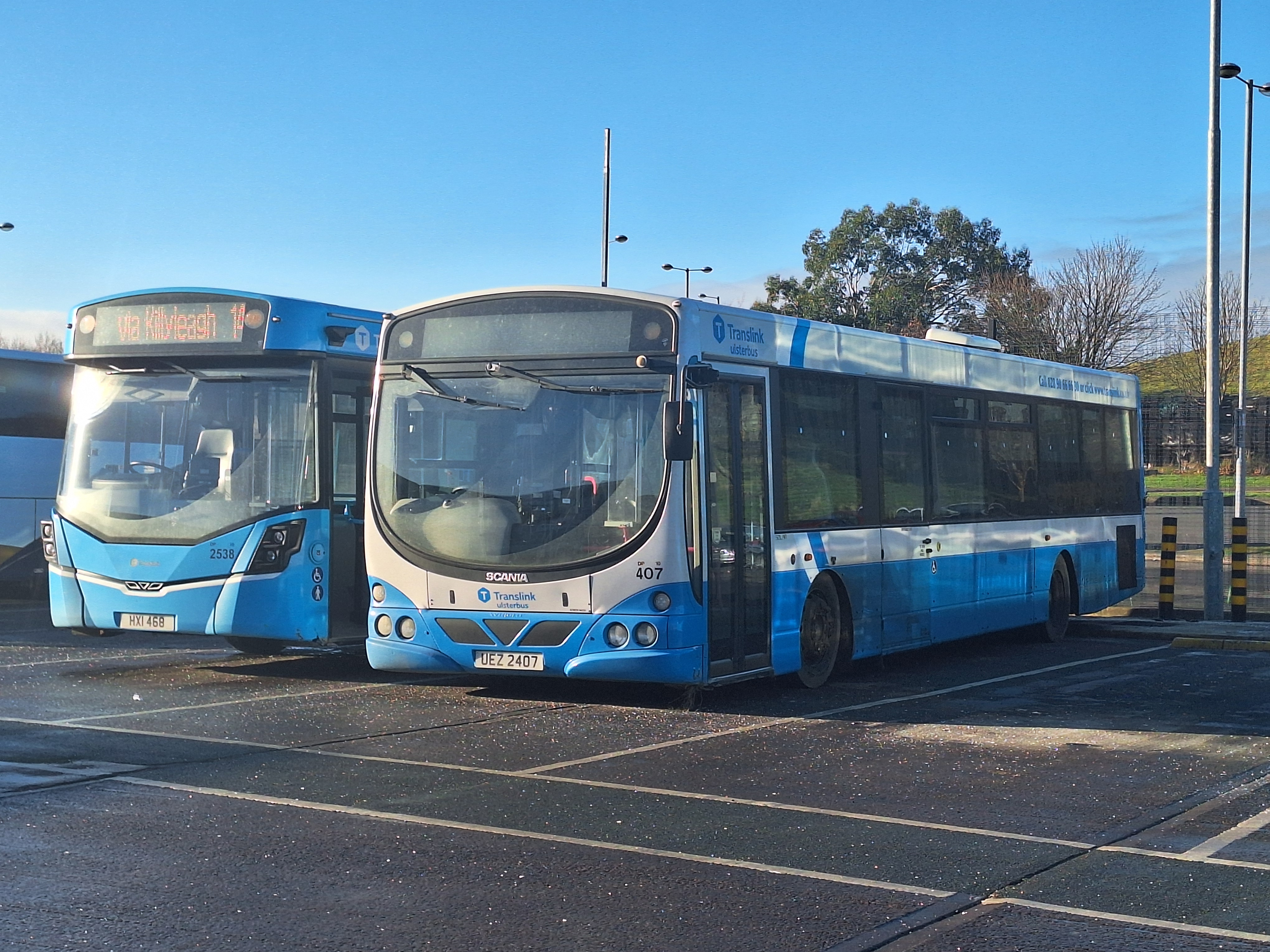
A Wright GB Hawk and a Wright Solar Rural bodied Scania K230UB at Downpatrick bus station in January 2024

As of October 2021, the Ulsterbus fleet consists of nearly 1,100 buses and coaches, with buses predominantly bodied by Wrightbus of Ballymena.

Prior to the advent of low-floor buses, the Ulsterbus fleet mainly consisted of locally assembled Alexander-bodied Bristol REs, Leyland Leopards, Leyland Tigers and Volvo B10Ms. Many of these would be hijacked and maliciously destroyed throughout The Troubles, and as such, second-hand Bristol, Leyland and AEC buses were regularly purchased from bus operators in other parts of the UK.

The last Leyland Tiger of a fleet of over 600 was handed over to the company in September 1993, with Ulsterbus moving over to the Volvo B10M following the closure of Leyland Bus. Most high-floor Ulsterbus buses were withdrawn by the mid-2000s; the last Leyland Leopards were finally withdrawn in 2006, with 681 being built for Ulsterbus and 228 of these being maliciously destroyed.

Following an order for 40 Leyland Atlanteans in 1971, no further double decker buses were ordered, as they were seen as expensive to run and not offering good value for money at the time. In 2001, however, double decker buses were reintroduced to Northern Ireland through the purchase of 20 low-floor Volvo B7TLs with Alexander ALX400 bodywork for both Ulsterbus and Citybus.
