= Sunsundegui =

Spanish manufacturer of buses and coaches

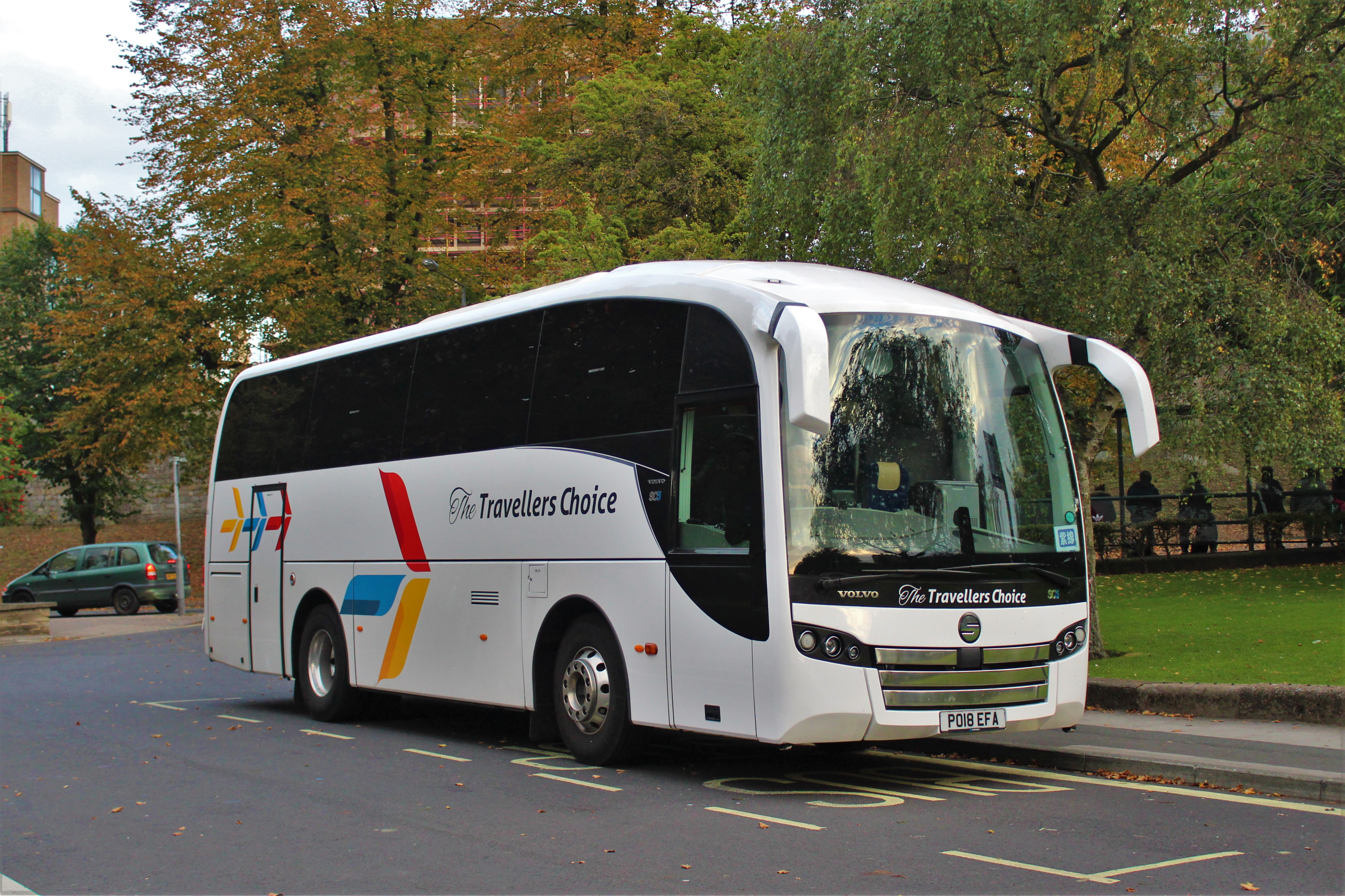
- A 2018 Sunsundegui SC5
- Company type: Sociedade Anónima (S.A.)
- Industry: Commercial vehicles
- Founded: 1944
- Defunct: April 2025
- Headquarters: Alsasua, Spain
- Key people: José Ignacio Murillo (MD)
- Products: Buses and coaches
- Revenue: €16 million (2022)
- Number of employees: 250 (2022)
- Website: www.sunsundegui.com/en/

Sunsundegui was a bus and coach manufacturer based in Alsasua, Spain.

== History ==
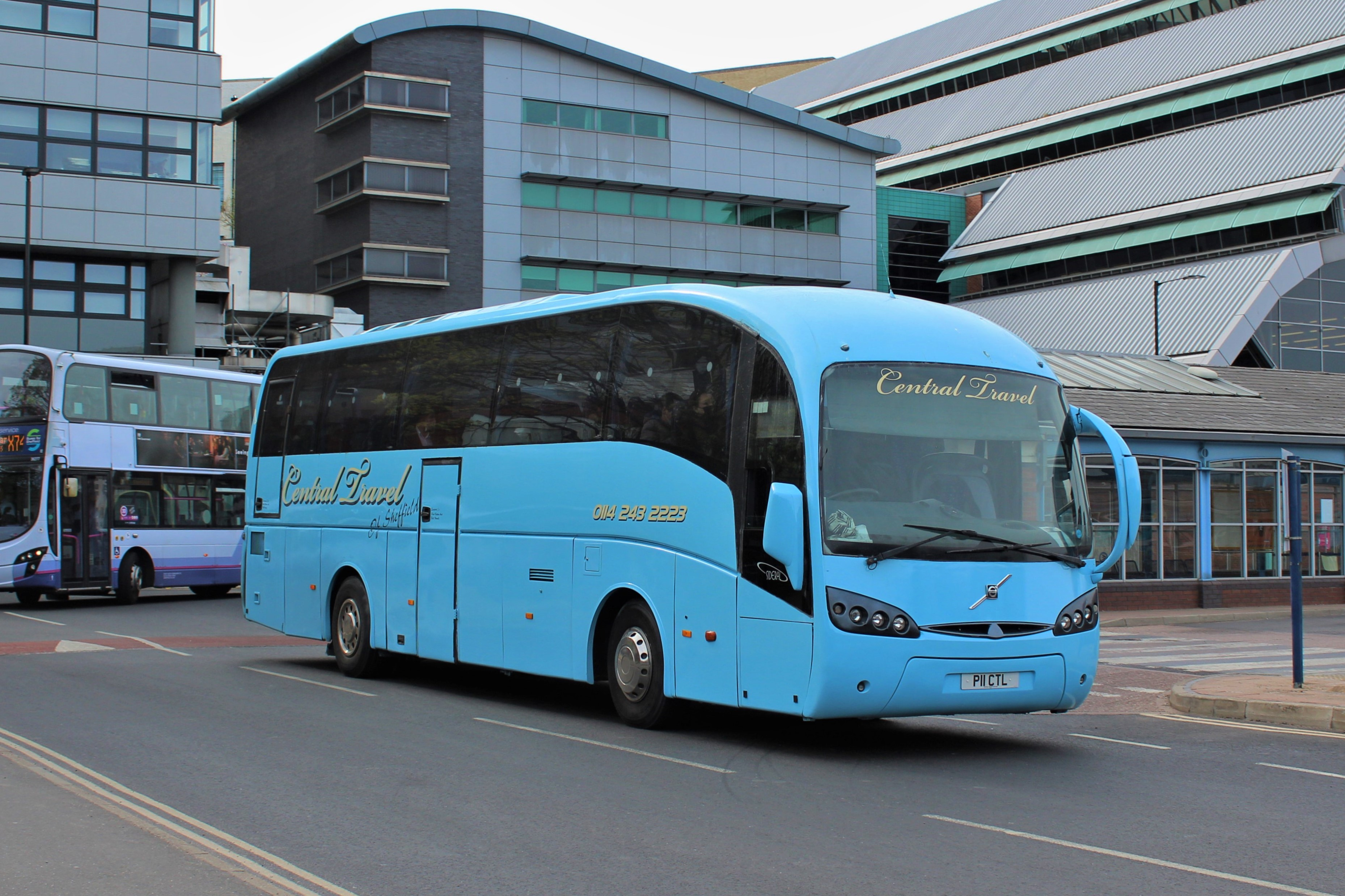
A 2005 Sunsundegui Sideral touring coach on Volvo B12B chassis seen in Sheffield

The company namesake is businessman José Sunsundegui, who founded the company in the Basque Country town of Irún in 1944. Sunsundegui initially started out as a rolling stock repair workshop for Renfe, the Spanish state railway company. This practice continued until the 1980s, when Renfe began to open their own engineering workshops and ceased to use Sunsundegui's services; the company changed focus as a result, launching their first production coach, the Sunsundegui Korinto, in 1987. In 2017, Sunsundegui moved into a €5.5 million new factory in Alsasua.

The first model to see significant export success was the Sunsundegui Sideral, which was exported to the United Kingdom and the Republic of Ireland in large numbers in the early to mid-2000s. In the late 2010s and early 2020s, the Sunsundegui SB3 and SC5 were ordered in large numbers by Bus Éireann, Go-Ahead Ireland and Ulsterbus for intercity bus services on the island of Ireland; Israel also emerged as another strong export market for the company. Translink Ulsterbus ordered 30 tri-axle Sunsundegui SC5-bodied Volvo B11R coaches for intercity routes in September 2019, followed by a further 30 identical vehicles in September 2020 for Goldline services.

Sunsundegui produced 462 buses and coaches in 2019; by 2022, exports to other countries made up 86% of Sunsundegui's total production. Sunsundegui received a loan of €8.9 million from the provincial government of Navarre in May 2022, after struggling through the COVID-19 pandemic due to a reduced demand for new vehicles. Prior to the pandemic, Sunsundegui employed 550 people; this reduced to 250 employees by March 2022, although plans were in place to begin new recruitments. After being granted the loan, Sunsundegui announced their intention to commence construction of electric vehicles from 2024. In 2025, the company went into liquidation.

== Models ==
Sunsundegui have predominantly produced high-floor coaches throughout their history, diversifying into low-floor city bus models in the late 2010s.

=== At the time of closure ===
- SB3 – intercity bus, available in low entry and high floor versions, available in several chassis. Replaced the Astral.
- SB3 Go – new version of the SB3, only available in high floor with Volvo B8R chassis.
- SC5 – coach available in different chassis and lengths. Replaced the Sideral.
- SC7 – luxury and higher version of the SC5, also available in different chassis and lengths.

=== Previous ===
- Astral – replacement for the Interstylo introduced in 2004. It was available in low entry, and articulated versions.
- Astral Via - low floor version of the Astral. It was only available with Volvo B9L chassis and MAN A22-nl283f.
- Interstylo – intercity bus. Also available in articulated and low entry.
- Citystylo - low floor version of the Interstylo. Available with MB O405N2, Volvo B10L and MAN NL202F (only in EMT Madrid).
- Korinto – the first Sunsundegui coach, launched in 1987.
- Sideral – touring coach that replaced the Vardino, launched in 2000.
- Stylo – touring coach that replaced the Korinto.
- Vardi – articulated version of the Vardino.
- Vardino – touring coach introduced at Seville Expo '92.
