= Mauds Ice Creams =

Ice cream manufacturer from Northern Ireland

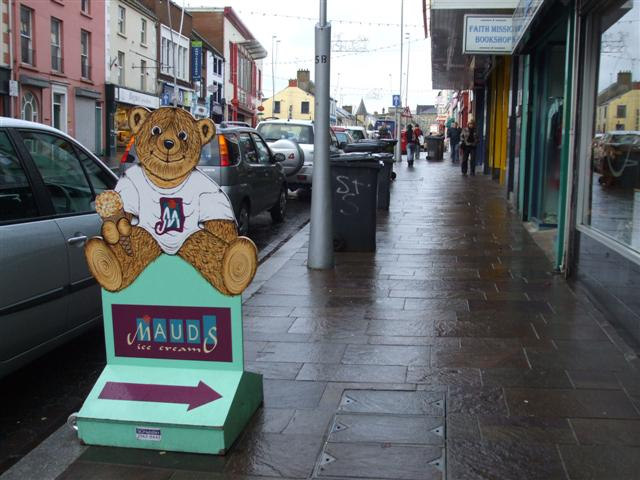
- Industry: Ice cream
- Founder: Roberta Wilson; John Wilson
- Headquarters: Carnmoney, Northern Ireland
- Products: Ice Cream
- Website: mauds.com

Mauds Ice Creams is an ice cream manufacturer from Northern Ireland, which at one point had stores across the island of Ireland and one in England. The company has made over 350 flavours during its 44-year history, the most popular being Poor Bear, a mix of vanilla ice cream and honeycomb. They are the largest producer of dairy ice cream in Northern Ireland.

== History ==
Mauds Ice Creams was founded by Roberta and John Wilson and was originally part of their grocery business in Carnmoney, County Antrim, Northern Ireland. The ice cream was made in-store, and its sales quickly became the major part of the business, and on Mothers' Day 1982, they renamed the store as Mauds Ice Creams as a Mother's Day gift to John's mother, of that name. Up to the late 1990s, the company used a small local dairy, Deerpark, for its milk, and when that closed, they moved to Ballyrashane Creamaries in Coleraine. By 1998, they employed 15, and had their main factory in Glenoe, near Larne, and a distribution depot in Antrim.

By 2002 the company employed 18, and was exporting to more than 50 customers in the Republic of Ireland; in that year, the company announced plans to grow staffing by 20, and invest around a million pounds, with support from Invest Northern Ireland to grow its export business. Production, originally done between Glenoe and Antrim, was moved in March 2002 to a modern production facility in Carrickfergus. By 2003, production was 40,000 litres a week, peaking at 60,000 litres for the hottest two summer months.

As of 2018, Mauds was the largest manufacturer of ice cream in Northern Ireland.

== Sales ==
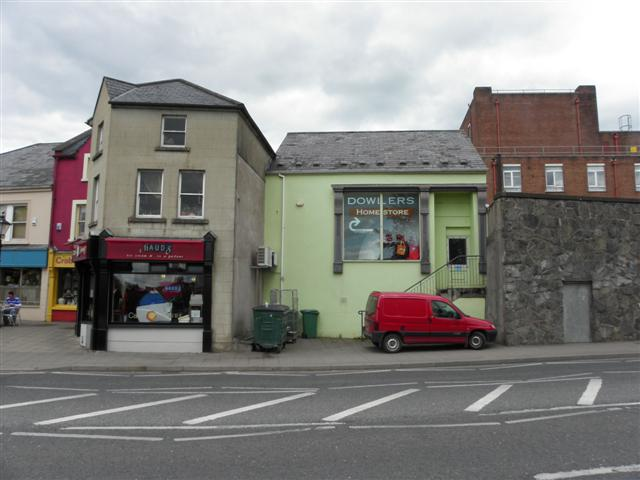
Branch at Enniskillen, Northern Ireland

Mauds products are sold at over 300 locations across the whole island of Ireland, including dedicated ice-cream parlours, cafes, restaurants and hotels. The company began as seller and retailer, later adding its own distribution, and had at one point at least 7 outlets of its own, but then moved its focus to manufacturing alone. At one point one ice-cream parlour operator was also offering licensing to other interested parties, for example an exclusive licence for County Sligo. An early licensor and ice-cream parlour operator, John Pell, later took on all-island distribution through his North South Retail operation. Weekly sales in summer reached 120,000 cones in 2003, and 200,000 in 2018.

There are "flagship" stores branded as Café Mauds, in Newcastle, County Down, opened in 1992, and at Lisburn Road, Belfast, both founded by John and Patricia Pell. The first shop outside the island of Ireland opened in Windsor, England, opposite the castle and in later years the company started to ship their ice cream to the Málaga area in Spain.

The company has made over 350 flavours during its 44-year history and two of its most popular flavours are Poor Bear, locally often Pooh Bear (honeycomb and vanilla, at one time accounting for 60% of sales, and originally called Pooh Bear's Delight, until Disney opened a store in Belfast and Managing Director John Wilson decided to be cautious about any potential copyright issues) and Belgian Chocolate (fine milk chocolate slivers in vanilla).

== Recognition ==
In 2004, it was the first ice cream producer on the island of Ireland to be crowned Champion of Champions by the Ice Cream Alliance, having won more than 50 previous medals and diplomas from the Alliance. From 2013-2021, it won five awards at the annual Blas na hEireann National Irish Food Awards.
