= Martha Craig =

Martha Craig (8 August 1866 – 2 April 1950) was an explorer, writer and lecturer on scientific theories from Ireland. She was considered to be the first European woman to explore the Labrador region of Canada, assisted by indigenous guides in 1905. She claimed to have been made a princess by "the Indian chiefs" of Labrador, and lectured in the US, Canada and Europe as 'Princess Ye-wa-ga-no-nee'. She wrote and lectured on her scientific theories based on her observations in Labrador and her belief in reincarnation. She was invited to meet US President McKinley and was the first woman to lecture in the University of Salamanca. She wrote poetry, non-fiction and science fiction books. Some of her poetry was published as Maeve Carrig and she may also have written under the pseudonym Mithra. In 2021, a plaque commemorating her was erected in her home town of Gleno, Co Antrim.

== Early life ==
Martha Craig was born on 8 August 1866 at Carneal, Gleno, Co Antrim to William Craig and Mary Nelson. She was educated in England and France. As a young woman she was a member of the Henry Joy McCracken Society and believed in radical land reform in Ireland to "cure the country of "landlordism".

== Career ==
Craig began a career in journalism and left Ireland for the United States in the late 1890s. She was invited to the White House by President William McKinley in 1898 where they discussed "Erin's hopes and freedoms".

She moved to Canada, where she wrote a book on The Garden of Canada, Burlington, Oakville and District in 1902. Her interest in indigenous culture led her to engage with the Anishinaabe chief Buhgwujjenee and she may have spent some time living with the Ketegauneseebee (Garden River First Nation). Craig claimed to have been adopted by the Nation and given the name Enookwasshooshah ("brave one").

In 1905, she explored the interior of Labrador, accompanied by "two Indian guides". She was published in Cosmopolitan in July 1905 claiming to be "the only white woman who has explored Labrador", though this is disputed by Mina Hubbard who led a similar expedition around this time. Craig also claimed to have been made a princess by "the Indian chiefs of Labrador". She began to lecture as 'Princess Ye-wa-go-no-nee', wearing her hair in braids with a feather headdress, describing her experiences "in the land of Hiawatha". This would today be called cultural appropriation.

It was also claimed that Craig gifted a "talking machine outfit" to an indigenous tribe who gave her a gold mine in exchange.

=== Theories ===
In her lectures, Craig expounded on pseudo-scientific theories based on her explorations in Labrador. One of these was the Vortex Theory which claimed that "vortexian currents" rather than gravity bound objects to the Earth. This was based on her erroneous observation that the Aurora Borealis were rushing outwards from Earth.

She also believed that "all life is vibration" and that she had been reincarnated from an Indian princess called Meta. She met with some ridicule in the press for her outlandish theories but she was also given platforms to write and speak about them. Her Vortex Theory appeared on the front page of the American Register newspaper and she was invited to lecture at the University of Salamanca, the first woman to do so. Her theories were also "duly considered" by the Académie des Sciences in France.

=== Bibliography ===
- The Garden of Canada. Burlington, Oakville and District. 1902. Toronto: William Briggs.
- First Principles: A Manifesto of the Vortex Theory of Creation, London: Harrison, 1906.
- The Men of Mars, by Mithra, 1907.
- Legends of the North Land, c1910
- On, by Maeve Carraig, c1918

== Later life and death ==
Craig returned to Ireland after 1907 where she continued to write poetry, including a poem about her homeland of Gleno. In 1914 she lodged a patent in Belfast for the invention of "a method of constructing dirigibles, so as to minimise the danger of explosions".

The home she shared with her elderly sister Margaret was destroyed by fire in 1946.

Craig died on 2 April 1950 aged 83 at her sister's house in Carneal. She is buried in Gleno Churchyard.

In 2020, Belfast-born artist Lauren Gault presented a lecture and exhibition on Craig's writings, particularly her 1907 science fiction novel The Men of Mars.

In October 2021, a blue plaque commemorating Craig was erected by the Ulster History Circle in Gleno. It was unveiled by her great, great nephew Gordon McDowell. It reads: Martha Craig 1866–1950, Enookwashwooshah ‘Brave Woman', Writer, Lecturer, Explorer, Born at Carneal, Gleno, Explored Labrador, Canada 1905.
