= London Buses route 465 =

London bus route

465
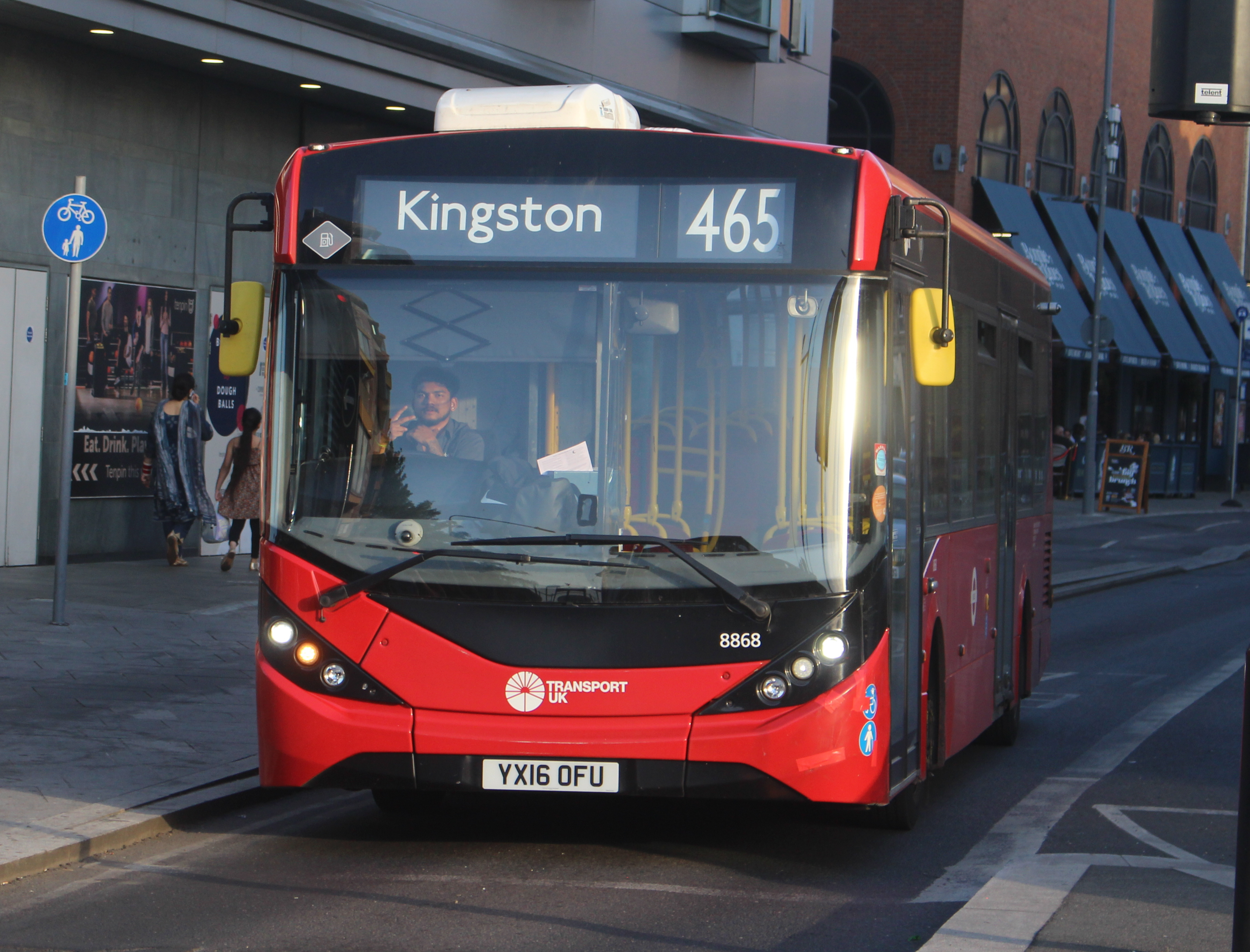
- Transport UK London Bus Alexander Dennis Enviro200 MMC at Kingston station in May 2026

Overview
- Operator: Transport UK London Bus
- Garage: Twickenham
- Vehicle: Alexander Dennis Enviro200 MMC
- Peak vehicle requirement: 7
- Night-time: No night service

Route
- Start: Cromwell Road bus station
- Via: Surbiton; Hook; Chessington; Malden Rushett; Leatherhead; Fetcham; Mickleham
- End: Dorking
- Length: 15 miles (24 km)

Service
- Level: Daily
- Frequency: About every 30-60 minutes
- Journey time: 50-85 minutes
- Operates: 05:15 until 00:33

London Buses route 465 is a joint Transport for London and Surrey County Council contracted bus route in London and Surrey, England. Running between Cromwell Road bus station and Dorking, it is operated by Transport UK London Bus.

The route extends the furthest from London of all Transport for London routes.

== History ==
From around the mid-1990s, service 465 was operated by London & Country. Upon being re-tendered, it passed to Tellings-Golden Miller on 1 May 1999 and was extended past Kingston to Tellings' Fulwell Bus Garage. On 17 June 2005, route 465 was included in the sale of Tellings-Golden Miller to Travel London.

In May 2006 the route was curtailed at Kingston and replaced by a new, less frequent route 481, despite a protest by a local group to keep the service.

Upon being re-tendered, on 30 June 2007 the route passed to Arriva Guildford & West Surrey. The contract change also saw the route withdrawn from Penrhyn Road in Kingston, due to complaints from residents over the number of buses using the road. The replacement route is via Surbiton Road and Portsmouth Road.

On 3 October 2009, route 465 was included in the sale of Arriva Guildford & West Surrey's Horsham operation to Metrobus. It was the only Transport for London contract to be worked out of the company's Crawley garage.

Upon being re-tendered, on 30 June 2012 the route passed to Quality Line with Optare Versas.

On 25 April 2020, the route was transferred with routes 406 and 418 to London United.

The route is jointly managed by Transport for London and Surrey County Council. The section between Leatherhead and Dorking is financially supported by the council.

== Current route ==
Route 465 operates via these primary locations:

- Cromwell Road bus station
- Surbiton station
- Hook
- Chessington
- Malden Rushett
- Leatherhead station
- Fetcham
- Mickleham
- Dorking station
- Dorking town centre
