= Countryliner =

British bus operating company

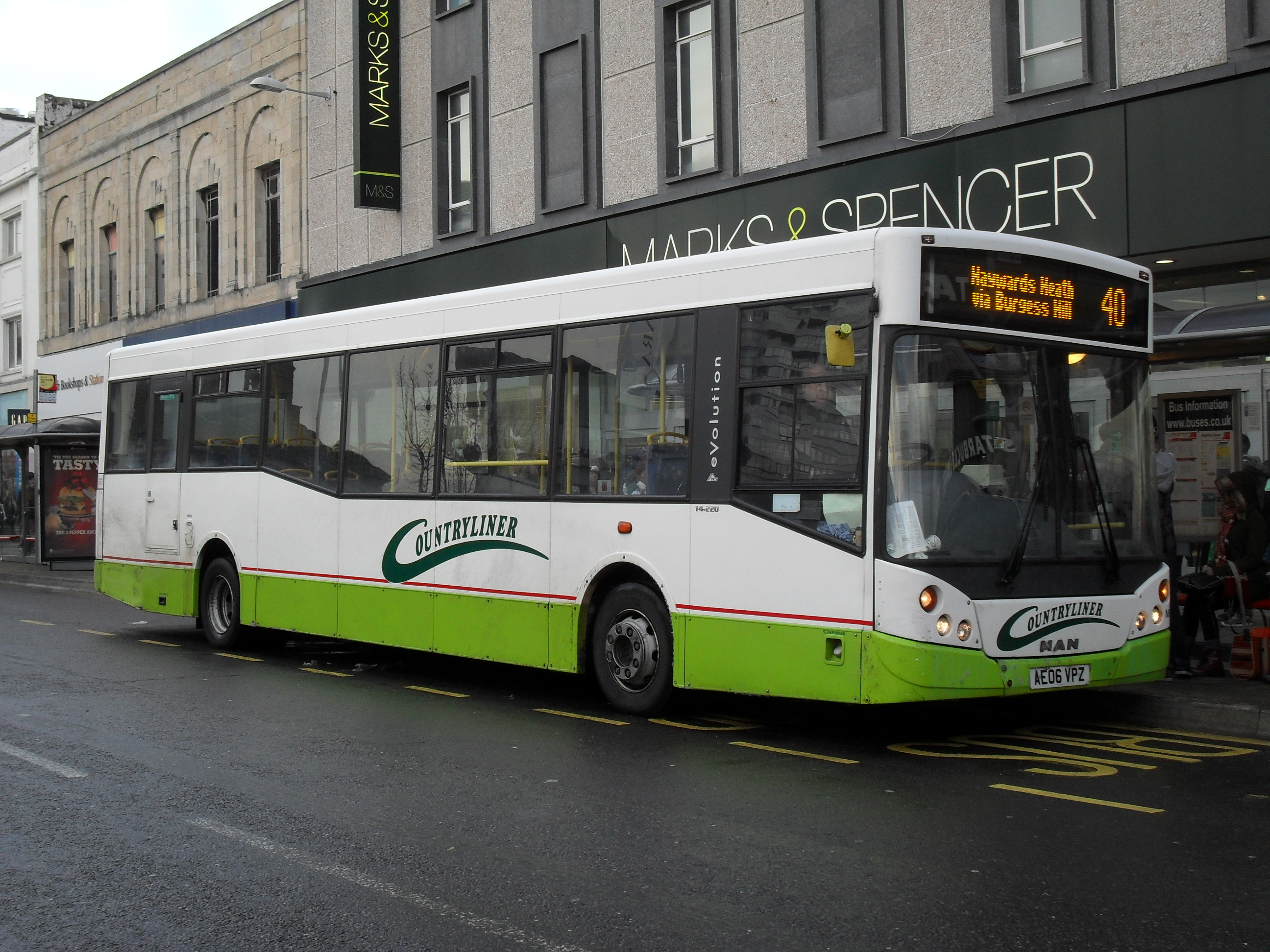
- MCV Evolution MAN 14.220 in Brighton in September 2010
- Founded: August 1998; 26 years ago
- Ceased operation: 18 January 2013; 12 years ago
- Headquarters: Uckfield, East Sussex, England
- Service area: Kent; Hampshire; Surrey; Sussex
- Service type: Bus operator
- Chief executive: Bob Hodgetts
- Website: www.countryliner-coaches.co.uk

Countryliner was a bus and coach operator, based in Uckfield, England. It ran over fifty bus services, mainly operating in Sussex and Kent with some operations into Hampshire. On 8 October 2012, it was placed in administration. It continued other services under a different licence trading as SwiftBus, this ceased trading on 18 January 2013.

== History ==
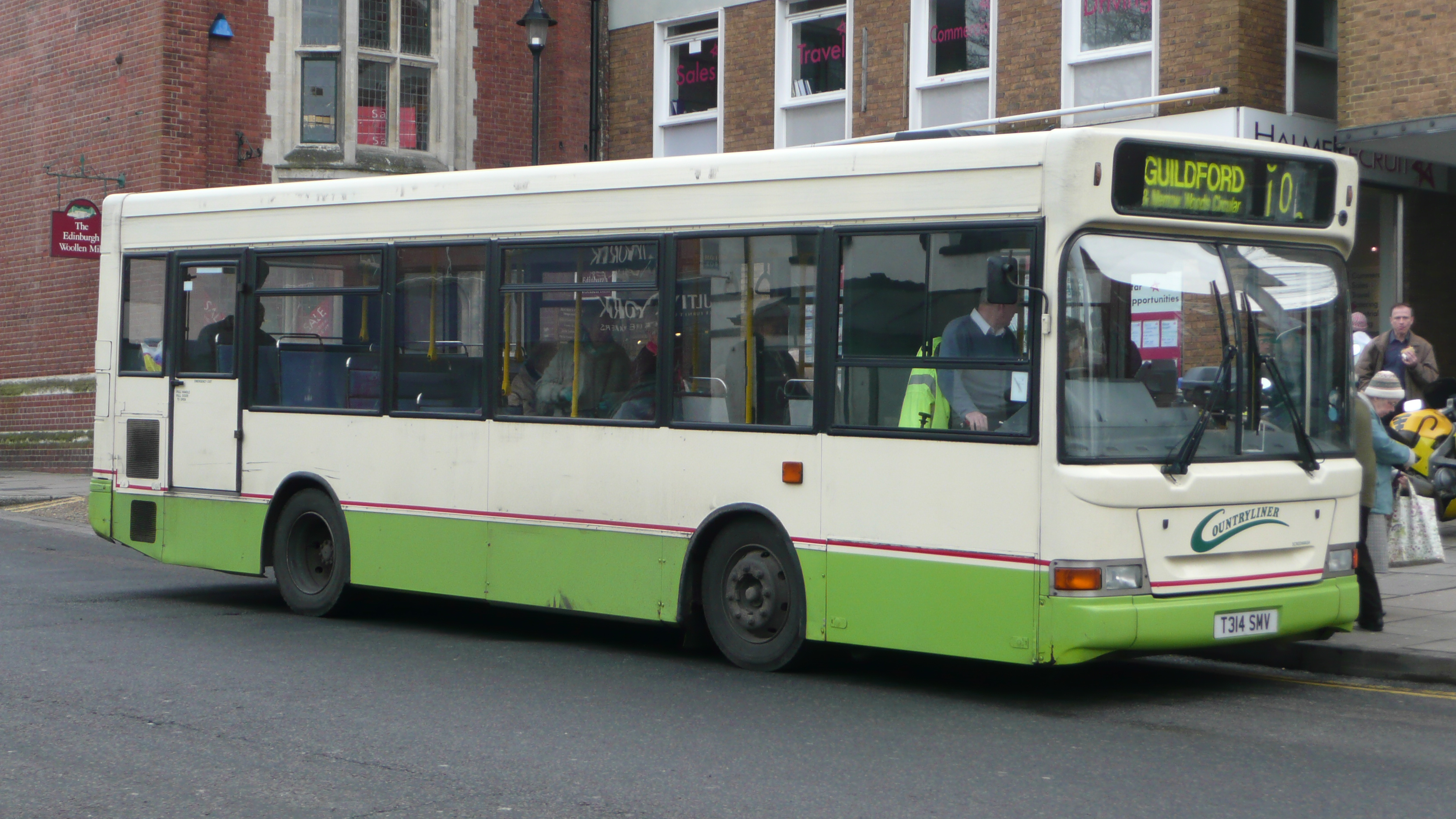
Plaxton Pointer 2 bodied Dennis Dart in Guildford in January 2009

The history of Countryliner can be traced back to 1911, with the formation of the East Surrey Traction Company, which was based in Reigate, Surrey. This later became part of the London General Omnibus Company, which was later absorbed into London Transport.

In 1933, Green Line operated coaches across the home counties and London. The success of a Guildford to Charing Cross route led to the opening of the bus depot in Guildford. Buses were suspended from normal operation during World War II, but afterwards, Green Line carried on operating from Reigate. The company was involved in the Festival of Britain in 1951. In 1970, Green Line lost its link to London Transport, to become part of London Country Bus Services, which was a subsidiary of the National Bus Company.

On 7 September 1986, the south west region of London Country Bus Services was transferred to London Country South West and on 19 February 1988 was sold to the Drawlane Group, which was restructured as British Bus in November 1992. On 1 August 1996, British Bus was sold to the Cowie Group, which in November 1997 was rebranded as Arriva.

Green Line's private hire department was renamed Countryliner in 1992, and in 1996 London & Country South West, bought Blue Saloon Coaches of Guildford, a large bus and coach operator in the area. In August 1998, Arriva sold Countryliner in a management buyout.

In 2001, the company diversified into bus operations. A new livery was adopted with a cream or white body, with a lime green skirt. Originally, buses were cream and coaches white, but most became white.

The fleet was renewed between 2001 and 2006, with low-floor Dennis Darts making up the bus fleet and a mixture of Mercedes-Benz and Volvos making up the coach fleet.

Countryliner Sussex was formed in 2006 to take over the bus operation of RDH Services of Ditchling Common, in East Sussex. It operated in Lewes, Burgess Hill, Kent and Haywards Heath. Countryliner Sussex was placed into administration in October 2012.

Countryliner Buses was also formed in April 2006, which took over the Hickstead operation of Compass Travel, also operating in the Burgess Hill and Haywards Heath area, and through to Brighton. At this time, the Countryliner group of companies operated around 80 vehicles through Surrey, Hampshire and Sussex.

In 2008, Countryliner commenced operating the Petersfield Town Services on behalf of Hampshire County Council, thus extending the operating area into Hampshire. In addition to this, more contracts were awarded to operate between Petersfield and Chichester and Midhurst on behalf of West Sussex County Council.

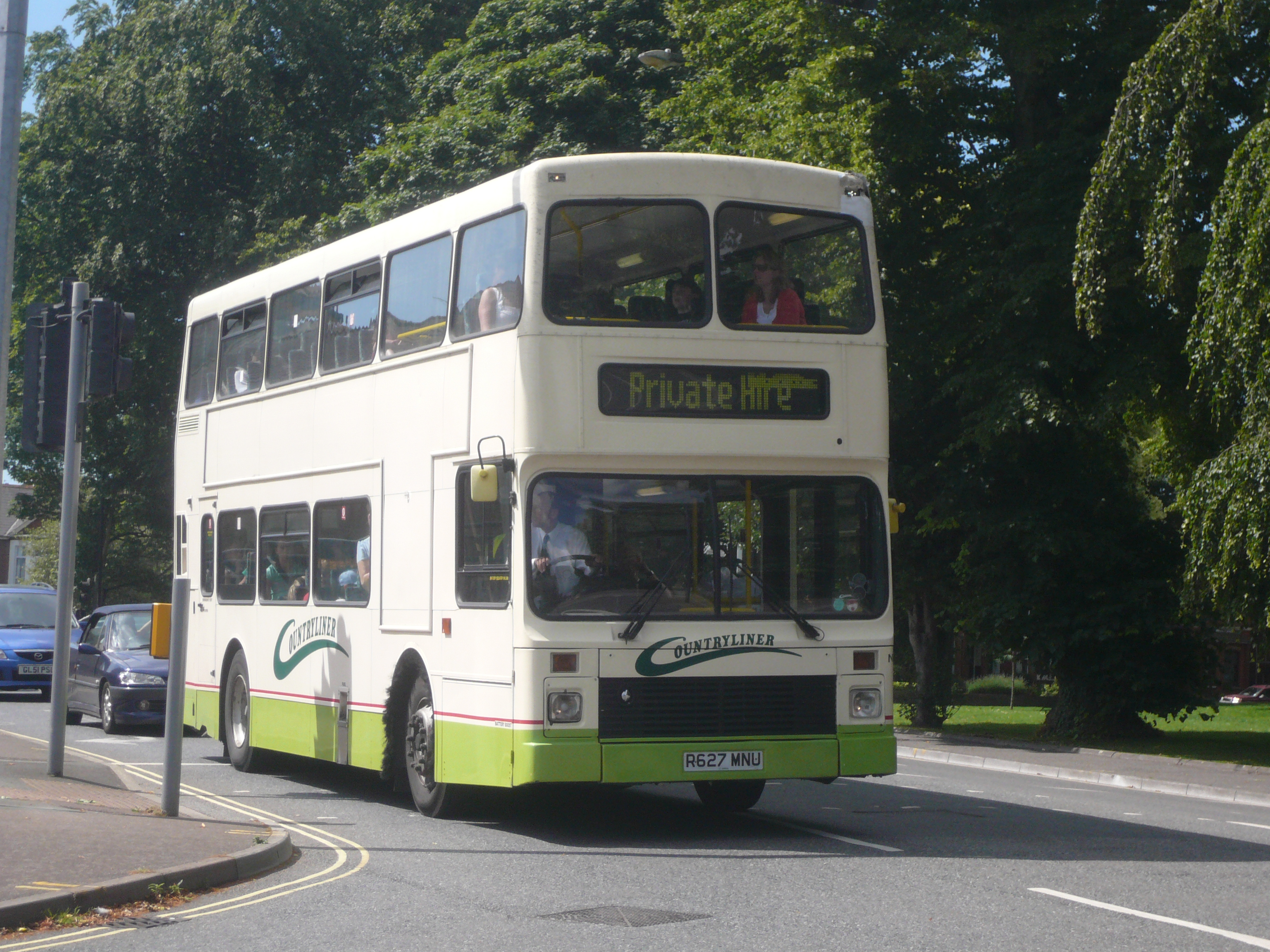
Northern Counties Palatine bodied Volvo Olympian on the Isle of Wight in June 2011

In June 2009, Countryliner Group Limited was formed, to take over full ownership of all Countryliner subsidiaries. Incorporated were Bob Hodgetts, Roger Belcher, James Holmes and Craig White, the former two of which are company directors. However, the latter two represent Merchant Corporate Recovery plc, who paid £200,000 for a 51% stake in Countryliner Group, and who also provided a working capital facility of £300,000, showing extra cash had to be put into the business. Holmes said, "the issues in the business can be clearly defined and the management has the ability to tackle them with our support". Merchant Corporate Recovery valued Countryliner's assets at the time as £1million and said it had made pre-tax profits of £250,000 for the first half of 2009.

In 2009, Countryliner's financial standing was further brought into question. In November, a High Court hearing to wind up three of the Countryliner Group's companies, under the Insolvency Act 1986, was adjourned until January. The affected companies were Countryliner Buses Limited, Countryliner Coach Hire Limited and Countryliner Sussex Limited. With Countryliner operating around 150 vehicles with around 200 staff at the time from five depots in Hampshire, Surrey, West and East Sussex and into Kent, it caused worry among passengers and local authorities. Countryliner ran 23 routes in Surrey and Hampshire at the time, and during the proceedings Surrey County Council - who Countryliner ran a number of services under contract to - said they were "monitoring developments". Countryliner made no comment but to confirm services were operating normally and that a restructuring was underway.

The adjourned hearing took place on 20 January 2010. It emerged that the winding up order had been started by HM Revenue & Customs (HMRC) over an unpaid debt. At the hearing, the applications were dismissed and Countryliner were awarded costs against HMRC. Director Roger Belcher said, "There was an outstanding debt to HMRC and they issued winding-up orders even though our negotiators were speaking to them at the time." The Countryliner Buses company had paid off all its debts and been liquidated, and Countyliner Coach Hire entered into a company voluntary arrangement.

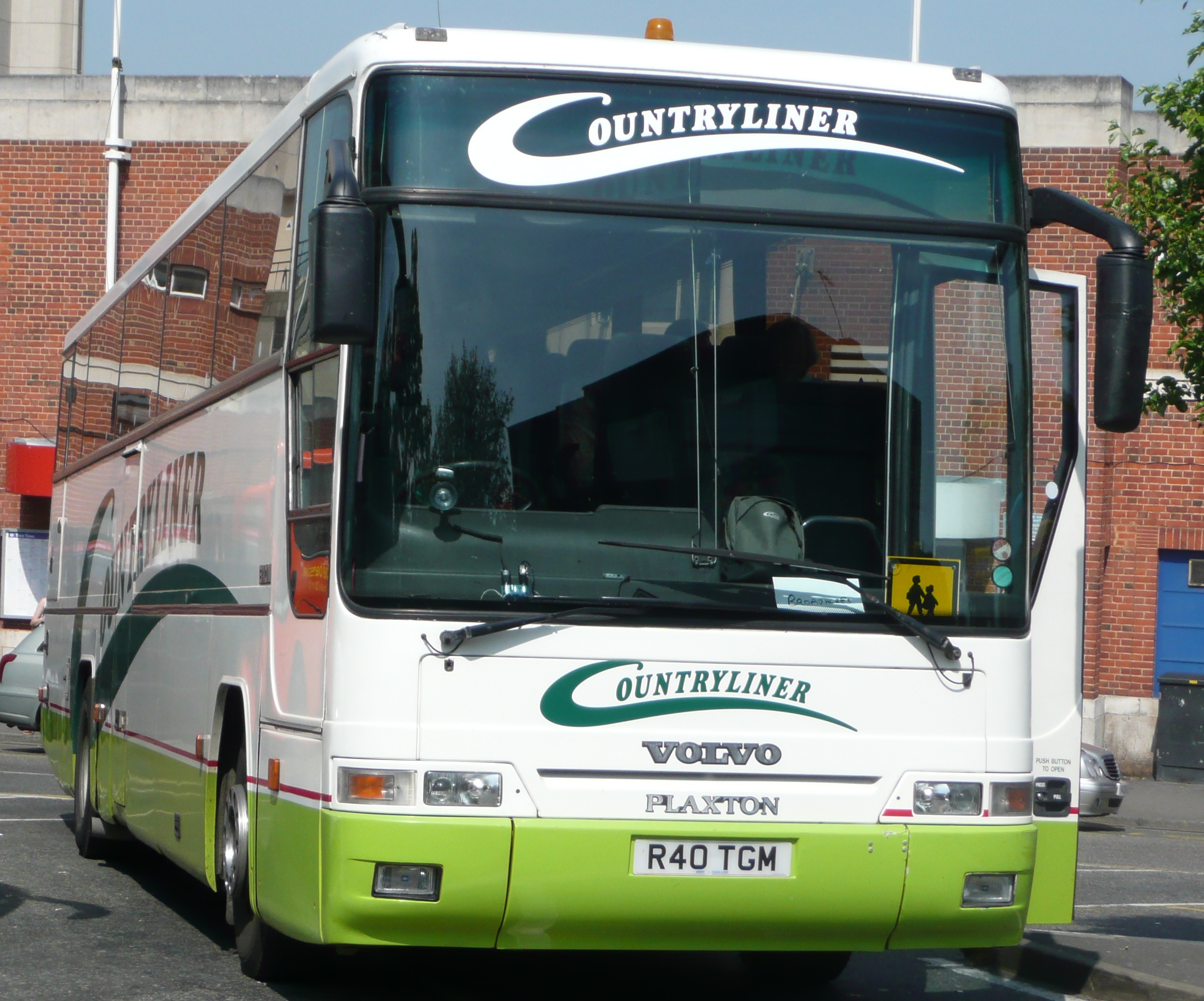
Plaxton Premiere bodied Volvo B10M in May 2008

Roger Belcher was confident about the business, saying at the time that "it's trading healthily" and that there was never a risk that they would have been wound up: "All of our suppliers have been paid on time and all of our staff have been, there's one creditor and one creditor only." The third winding up order against Countryliner Sussex Limited was heard on 17 February. As per what Roger Belcher expected in January, all debts were paid off in time for the hearing and that case too was thrown out.

A number of changes to the company's Surrey network occurred from August 2010, as part of phase 1 of the Surrey County Council "Bus Review", a review of all of Surrey County Council's tendered services, with the aim of reducing the amount of subsidy paid by the council. Routes 73, 81, 462 and 463 were taken on commercially. All of Countryliner services in Surrey had previously received some form of support from the County Council. As part of the changes, routes 71, 72 and 97 were withdrawn, and Countryliner lost the tender for route 437 to Arriva Guildford & West Surrey. With this loss of work, Countryliner decided to start half-hourly commercial service 464 between Guildford and Cranleigh from the day of the bus review changes, in competition with Arriva Guildford & West Surrey routes 53 and 63.

Arriva also increased their services from the same weekend to every 15 minutes, however Countryliner's Neil Hatcher denied reports of a bus war (where Arriva would react to Countryliner's new service by purposely increasing theirs). Arriva's changes were not from the same day, and neither company would have been aware of the other's intentions at the time the changes were registered with the traffic commissioner.

Countryliner offered a more regular service to the Summerlands Estate in Cranleigh, and some buses ran via Guildford station towards Guildford unlike any other buses. Lower fares were charged, although Arriva did reduce their fares for their service changes. The service interworked with routes 462/3 to Woking (and from there the 73 to Chobham), with through fares available, although the workings did cause large problems with punctuality until February 2011 revisions. Neil Hatcher said that if the 464 was successful it would consider further expanding its services into Cranleigh's housing areas.

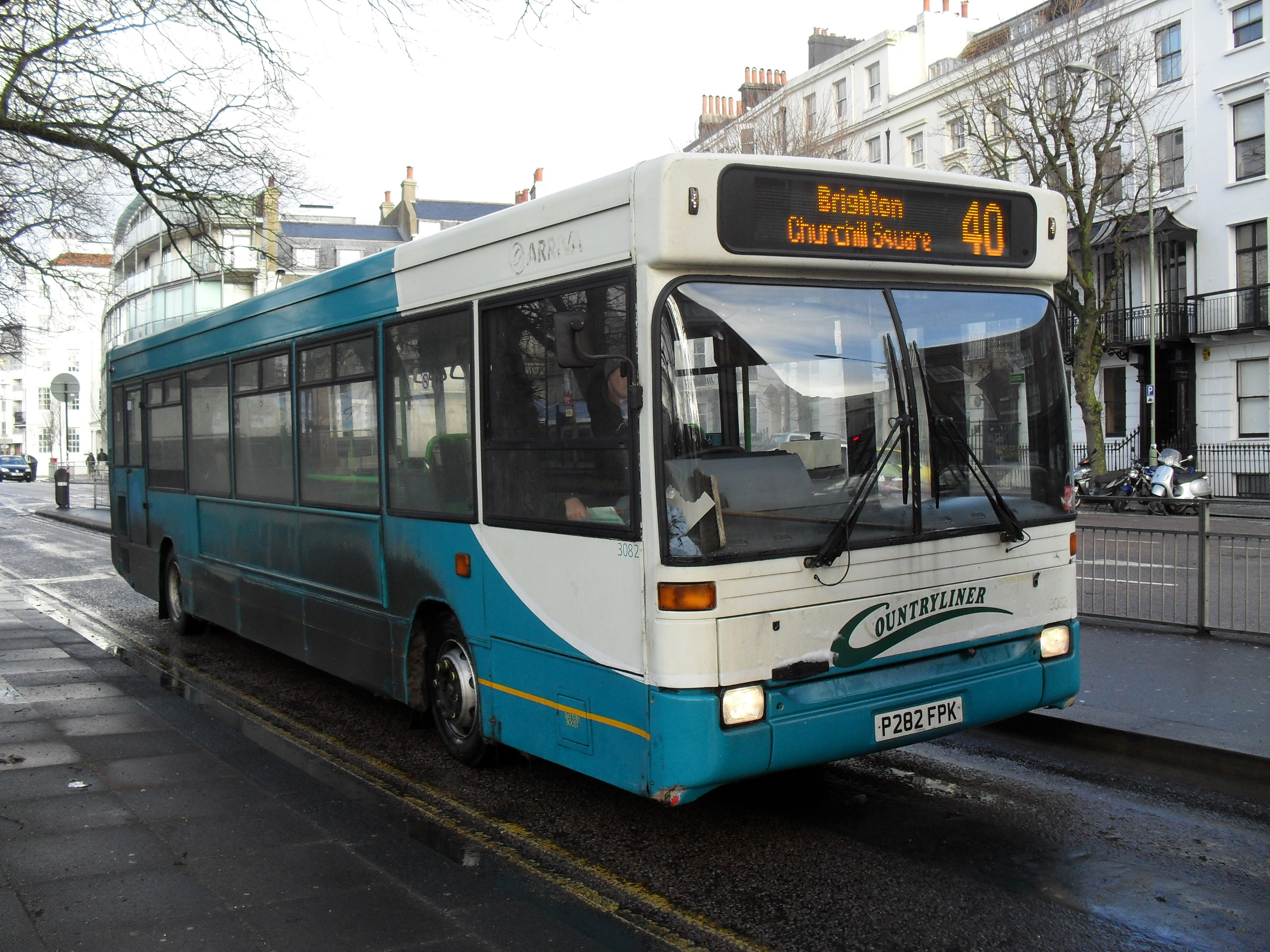
Arriva liveried Countryliner Plaxton Pointer 1 bodied Dennis Dart SLF in Old Steine in December 2010

Further financial problems surfaced on 1 March 2011 when Fisher Partners, a business recovery specialist, informed creditors that Countryliner Coach Hire Limited had failed to keep up its payments to HMRC, against the terms of the creditors voluntary agreement, and said that they were to petition a winding up order against Countryliner.

Countryliner faced further problems in 2011, this time regarding maintenance. At a three-day public inquiry finishing on 16 March 2011, just two out of five of the company's operator licences being investigated survived being cut by Traffic Commissioner Philip Brown. The Countryliner Coach Hire Limited licence, with authorisation for 35 vehicles, was revoked from the end of that week, from 23:59 on 18 March, after being found to have poor financial standing and having had several vehicle problems. This licence carried around half of the Surrey services and some Sussex ones.

The C&S Coach Travel Limited licence, with authorisation for 33 vehicles, was found to have lost its repute, in particular following the numerous tachograph infringements, and was revoked from 31 July 2011 to allow school contracts to finish at the end of the school year. A condition was attached that no new EU work could be taken on, and director Geoffrey Shaw was banned with immediate effect from holding or obtaining an O-licence for two years. The other director voluntarily resigned. The business was wound down gradually.

The Countryliner Limited licence, with authorisation for 15 vehicles, and with the other half of the Surrey routes on it, received a formal maintenance warning after a high MOT failure rate and was allowed to continue, again with the condition it must not take on any new EU work. The Countryliner Sussex Limited licence, with authorisation for 17 vehicles, carrying most of the Sussex and Kent routes, was allowed to continue. Again, no new EU work could be taken on, a new transport manager must be submitted by 25 March and finances must be shown. Finally, an application for a new licence, Countryside & Suburban Limited for 104 vehicles, was withdrawn at the inquiry. This was to have been a "catch-all licence" covering all of the Countryliner Group subsidiaries. Together, the O-licence authorisation fell from 140 vehicles to 72.

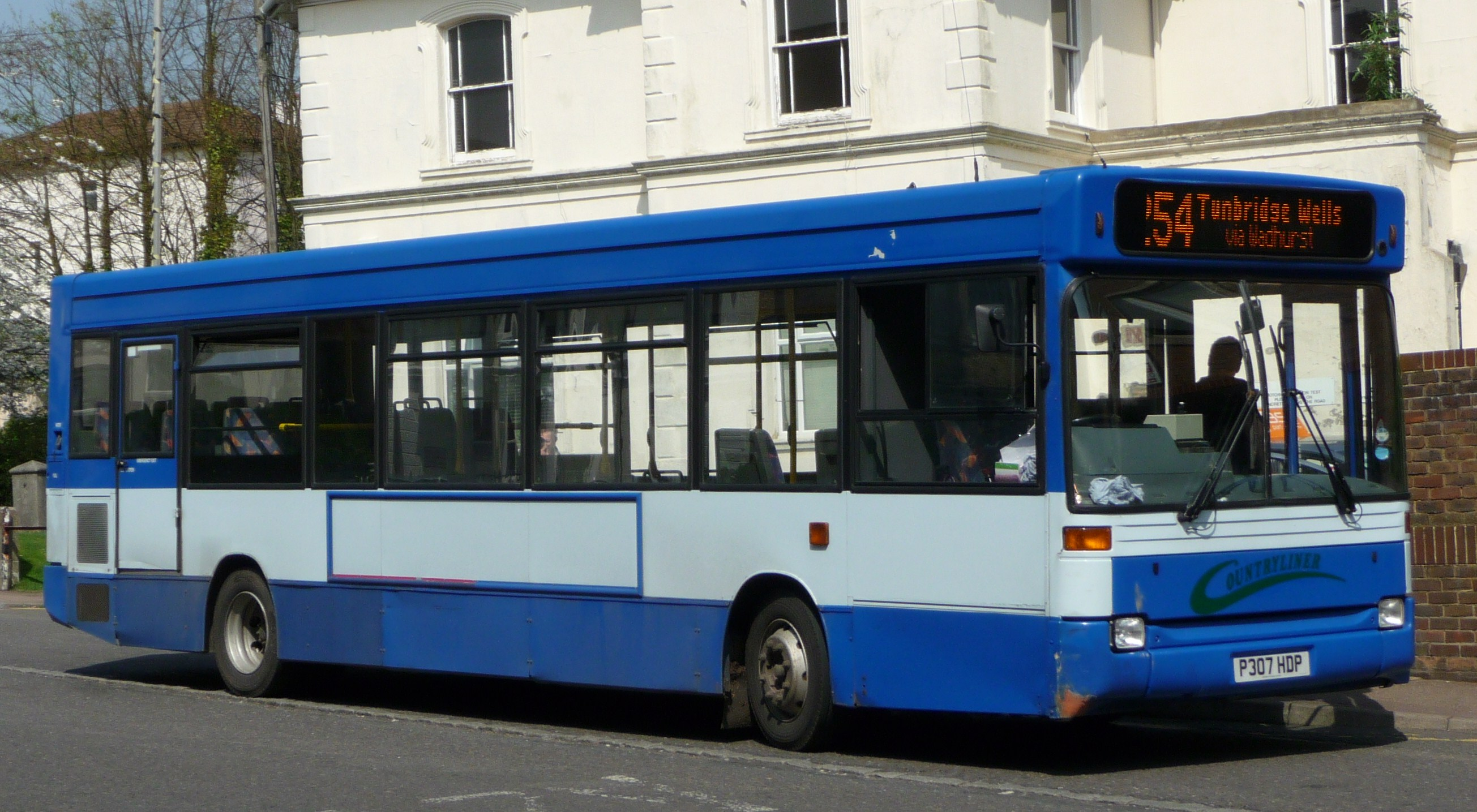
Metrobus liveried Countryliner Plaxton Pointer 1 bodied Dennis Dart SLF in Tunbridge Wells in April 2009

The final licence held by Countryliner Group, RJB (UK) Limited, with five O-licences for buses based at Borden, Hampshire, was not part of the inquiry, being in the Western Traffic Area as opposed to the South Eastern and Metropolitan area. To overcome the cut to the licences, Countryliner stopped operating several routes, and numerous routes changed to different licences. To overcome the immediate cut to the Countryliner Coach Hire Limited licence, Surrey routes 10/11, 98, 478, 678, 823, and E303 were abandoned, the 10/11, 478 and 678 Surrey County Council tenders all being taken on at short notice by Arriva from the next day of operation, similarly the 823 by Safeguard Coaches and the E303 by Reptons Coaches.

Route 98 was withdrawn with no replacement, being a limited commercial service with alternatives routes available. The remaining routes on the licence were spread to others, Surrey routes 11, 87, 89 and 479 to Countryliner Limited and Sussex routes 54, 56, 69, 79, 91, 92, X92 and 93 to Countryliner Sussex Limited. A planned service increase to route 464, including introduction of variation 474, was cancelled following the decision, as was planned route 78 to run every week from Cranleigh to Chichester Market. Countryliner are to focus on a reduced amount of local bus work, it is intended that by October 2011 all routes will have moved on to the Countryliner Sussex Limited licence, and by then most of the coach fleet will have been disposed of after the revocation of the C&S Coach Travel Limited licence. The company will have to re-affirm its financial standing every six months from 30 September 2011.

Soon after the decision, Countryliner cancelled the registrations for Surrey routes 81, 462, 463 and 464 which they had taken on commercially following the Surrey County Council Bus Review Phase 1, effective from 16 May 2011. Routes 81, 462 and 463 are being tendered by Surrey County Council from 16 May to 3 September 2011, however route 464 will not be replaced as it is a commercial venture in competition with Arriva. Should Countryliner not bid for or not win the tenders for the 81, 462 or 463, their presence in Surrey will have been almost halved since August 2010. Also due to Hampshire county council cuts Countryliner now operate the previously stagecoach run route 41 . Hampshire county council have also taken the Saturday service off this route.

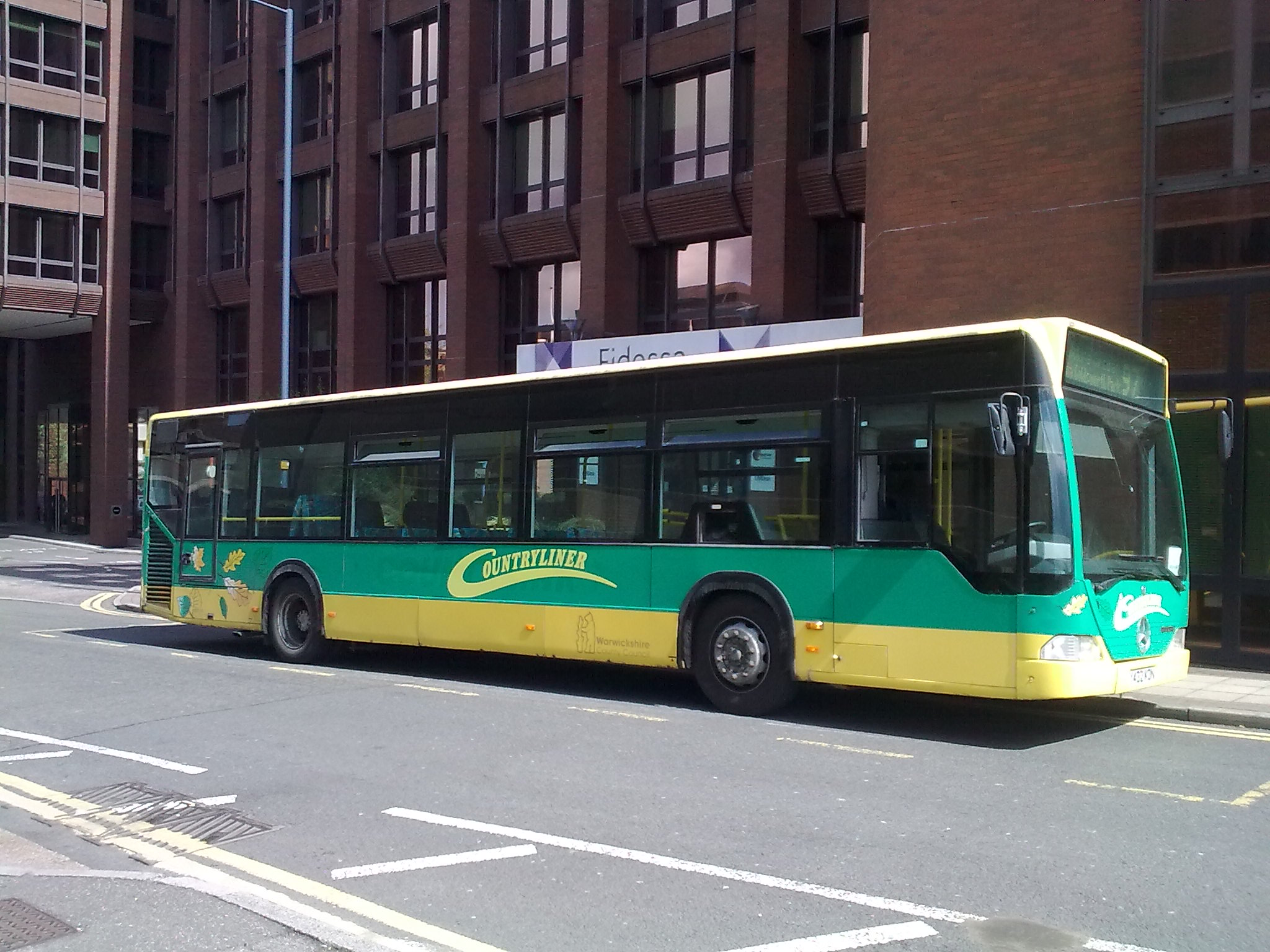
Warwickshire County Links liveried Countryliner Mercedes-Benz Citaro in Woking April 2010

As a result of phase 3 of the Surrey Bus Review, from September 2012 a number of changes were made to Countryliner services in Surrey. Route 516 (Epsom-Chart Downs) transferred to Coaches Excetera (formerly Croydon Coaches). Routes 24/25 were taken over from Arriva, whilst the 46 (Aldershot-Guildford) and 10 (Guildford town service) were taken over by Countryliner from Stagecoach Hants & Surrey and Abellio Surrey respectively.

On the evening of 8 October 2012, Countryliner Sussex was placed in administration. East Sussex County Council worked to provide alternative services from the next day, with Stagecoach Kent and Compass Travel taking on a number of services. The rest of the company continued operations largely as normal on 9 October, but in Surrey the company was unable to operate routes 10 and 11, with Abellio Surrey and Stagecoach stepping in on each route respectively on an emergency basis. Following this, Surrey County Council terminated all of their contracts with Countryliner's Surrey operations, stating that they felt Countryliner was "no longer in a position to run these services to the required standards". Routes were assigned to new operators from 10 October: Abellio Surrey 10, 73, & 81, Stagecoach Hants & Surrey 11, 43, 45, 46 & 87, Coaches Excetera 24, 25. The Fleet Buzz division of Stagecoach took over operation of route 11 on 11 October.

On 12 October 2012, Quality Line started operation of the 479 route, offering free travel on Friday 12 and Saturday 13 October, later extending to Monday 15th and Tuesday 16th. They planned for a new and simpler flat fare structure which would have applied from Monday 15 October. However, Sunray Travel also registered the route, and remained operating it with ex-Countryliner buses throughout, also offering free travel while Quality Line were running. On Tuesday 16th, the Traffic Commissioner accepted Sunray's registration and rejected Quality Line's, meaning that Sunray could start charging fares and leading to Quality Line withdrawing its service.

The surviving RJB (UK) Limited licence remained, re-branded as "SwiftBus", with buses frequently being swapped between RJB and Sunray. From 4 December 2012, 54, 91, 92 & 93 were reassigned to Emsworth & District following re-tendering by West Sussex County Council.

On 18 January 2013, RJB was placed in administration. From 21 January 2013, RJB's last remaining routes passed to Velvet (Petersfield Town Service 94 and Alton Cango C41/C42) and Stagecoach Hants & Surrey (41 Farnborough - Ash) on three month temporary Hampshire CC contracts. Stagecoach's Fleet Buzz division took on the 41 after the first week.

== Fleet ==
=== Surrey ===
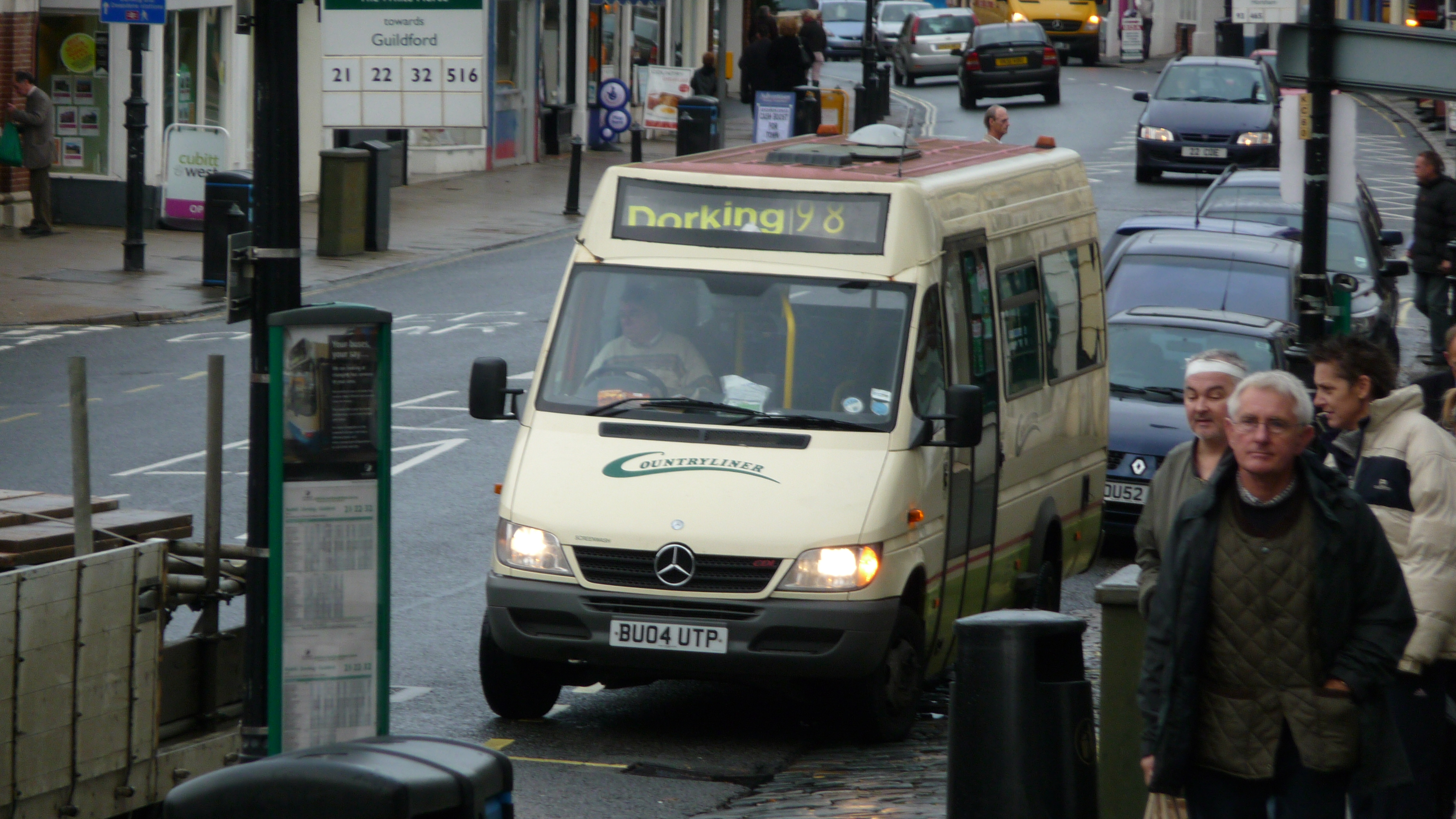
Mercedes-Benz Sprinter minibus in Dorking, Surrey in November 2009

The fleet was composed mainly of new and second-hand Dennis Darts with Plaxton Pointer bodywork. In 2006, two new Plaxton Primos and four MAN/MCV Evolutions were added to the fleet. Two second-hand MAN 14.220/East Lancs Myllenniums joined the fleet in August 2012. The coaching base was also here, most of which were Mercedes-Benz based minibuses.

=== Sussex ===
This fleet was more varied as it was taken over from RDH Services. It contained Optare Solos and Dennis Darts, as well as small numbers of other vehicle types.
