= London Buses route 111 =

London bus route

111
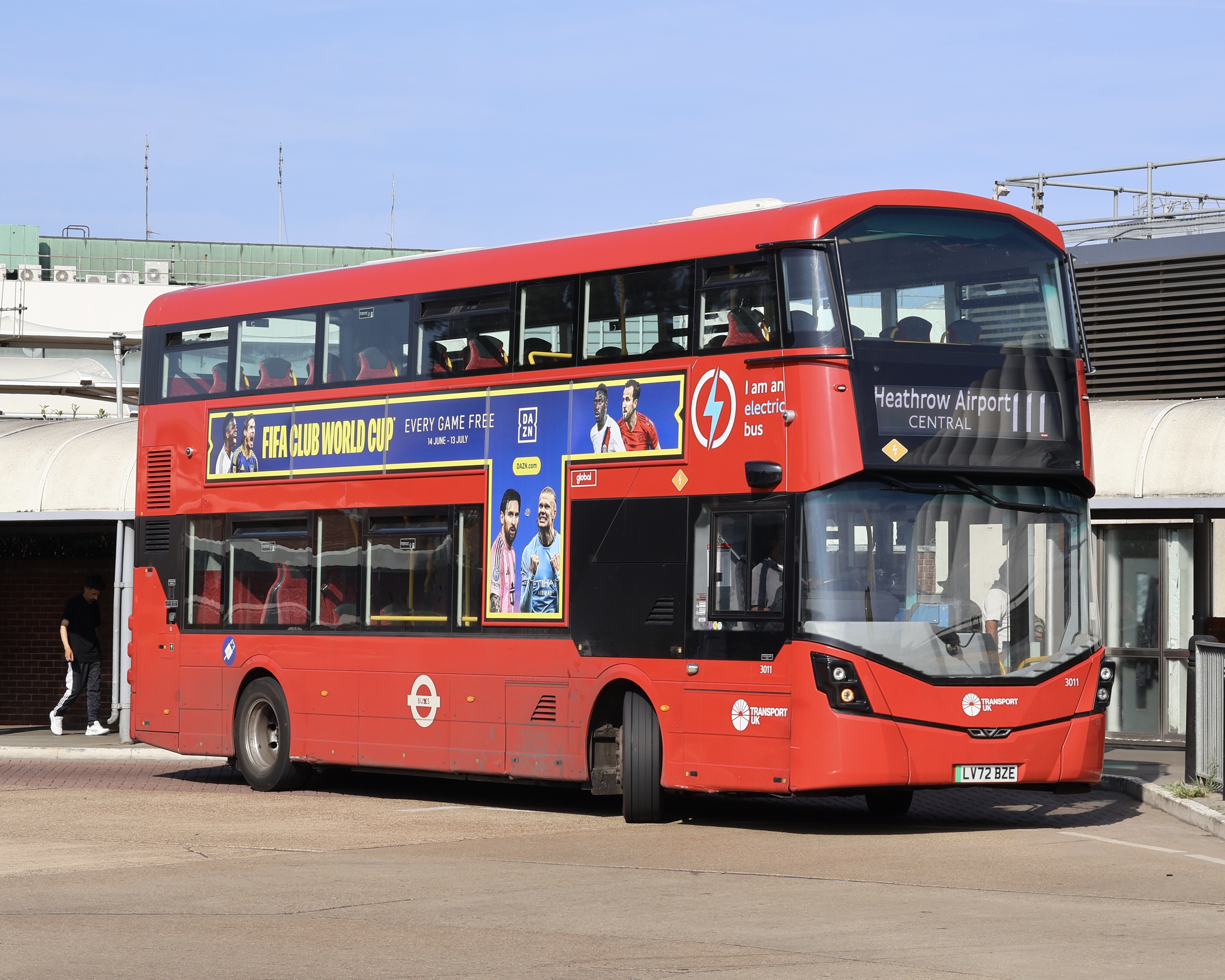
- Transport UK London Bus Wright StreetDeck Electroliner at Heathrow Central Bus Station in June 2025

Overview
- Operator: Transport UK London Bus
- Garage: Twickenham
- Vehicle: Wright StreetDeck Electroliner
- Peak vehicle requirement: Day: 25; Night: 4
- Began service: 16 February 1944
- Predecessors: Route 110
- Night-time: 24-hour service

Route
- Start: Heathrow Central bus station
- Via: Cranford; Heston; Hounslow; Hanworth; Hampton
- End: Cromwell Road bus station
- Length: 15 miles (24 km)

Service
- Level: 24-hour service
- Frequency: About every 8-15 minutes
- Journey time: 52-107 minutes
- Operates: 24-hour service

London Buses route 111 is a Transport for London contracted bus route in London, England. Running between Heathrow Central and Cromwell Road bus stations, it is operated by Transport UK London Bus.

== History ==
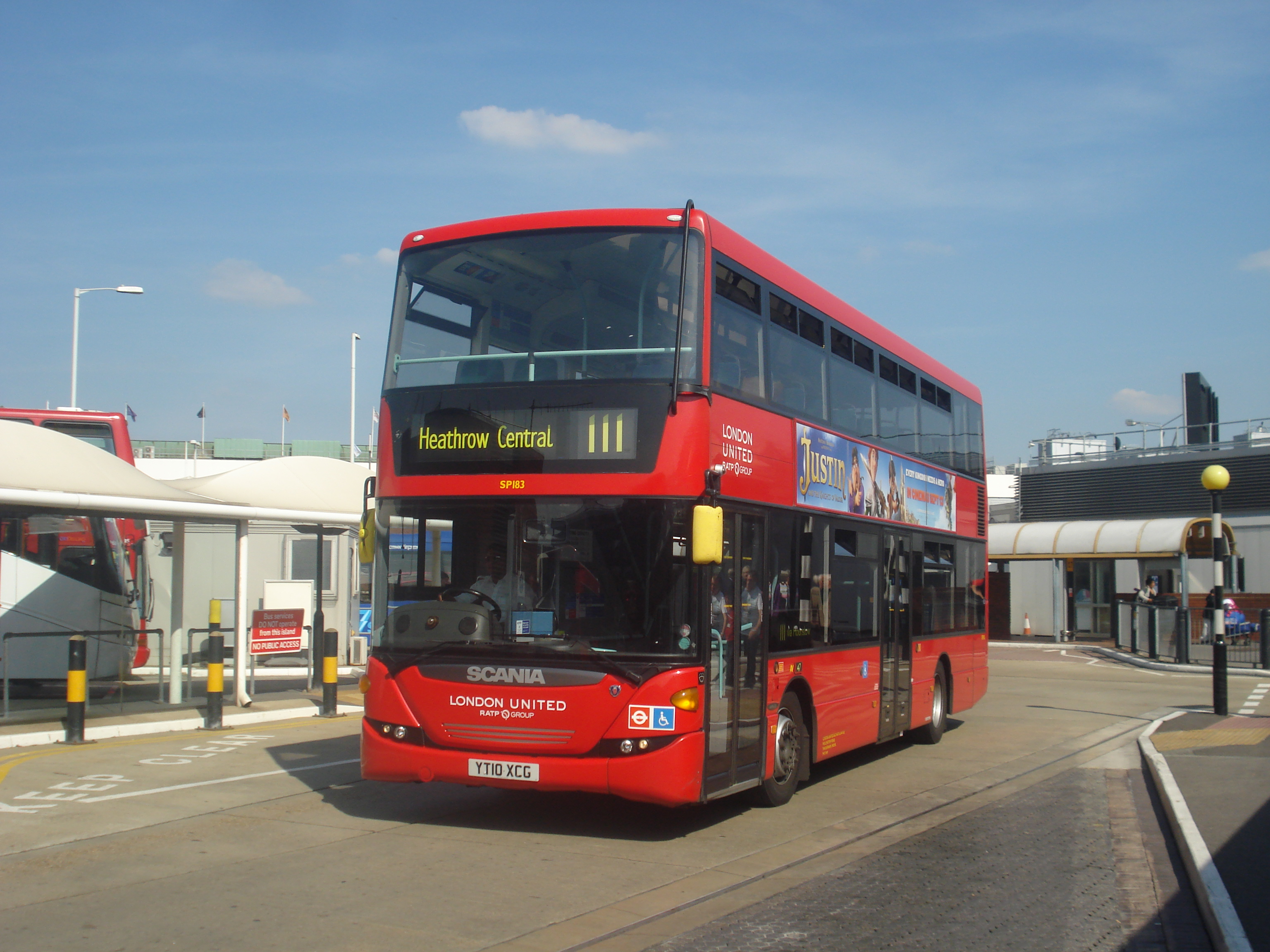
London United Scania OmniCity at Heathrow Central bus station in August 2013

Route 111 commenced operating on 16 February 1944 from Hounslow garage to Hanworth. It was converted to driver-only single-deck operation with AEC Swifts on 23 August 1969. At the same time a self-service system was introduced on routes 110 and 111, with passengers buying tickets from a machine. It was extended to Heathrow Airport in 1981.

From 1 December 2007, route 111 was converted into a 24-hour service; before its introduction a number of residents in Hampton complained to the local newspaper and Transport for London, who named the alternative of more route 481 buses bypassing Hampton to the north-east. Supporters of the extension in hours of operation included the Royal Borough of Kingston upon Thames.

Weekday peak hours service increased to every 8–9 minutes in 2010. The service was free within the Heathrow free travel zone, until the travel zone was abolished in June 2021 after Heathrow Airport Holdings withdrew funding.

Having been operated out of Hounslow garage since its inception, on 30 April 2022 it was taken over by Abellio London and began being operated out of Twickenham bus garage. The route was temporarily using New Routemasters prior to the arrival of 30 new Wright StreetDeck Electroliners, which began to be delivered in January 2023.

== Current route ==
Route 111 operates via these primary locations:

- Heathrow Central bus station
- Harlington Corner
- Cranford
- Heston
- Lampton
- Hounslow East station
- Hounslow bus station
- Hanworth
- Hampton School
- Hampton station
- Hampton Thames Street
- Hampton Court Palace
- Kingston upon Thames Wood Street
- Cromwell Road bus station for Kingston station
