= London Buses route 57 =

London bus route

57
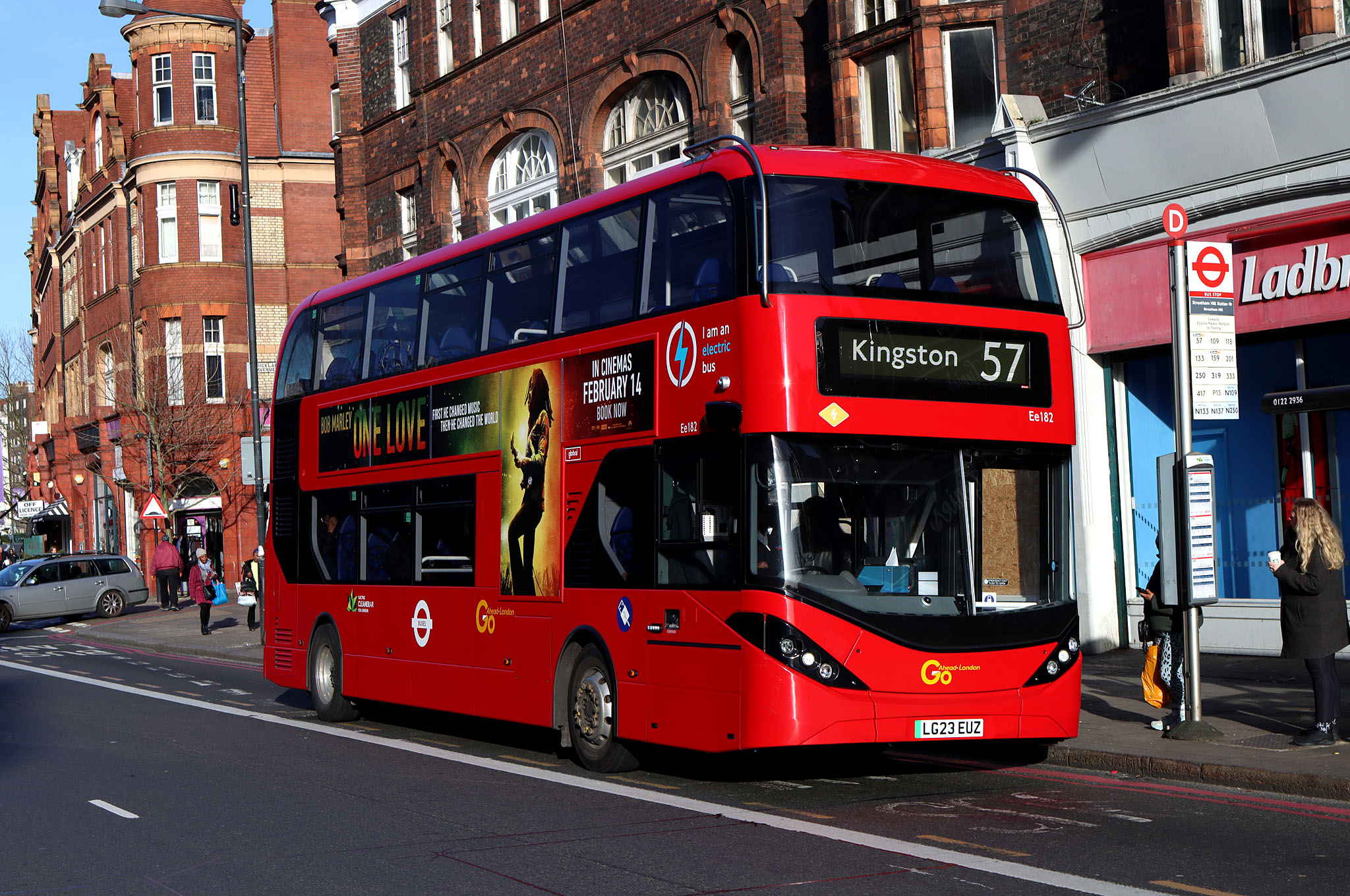
- London General BYD Alexander Dennis Enviro400EV at Streatham Hill station in February 2024

Overview
- Operator: London General (Go-Ahead London)
- Garage: Merton
- Night-time: 24-hour service

Route
- Start: Clapham Park
- Via: Streatham Hill; Streatham; Tooting; Colliers Wood; Merton Abbey; South Wimbledon; Wimbledon; Raynes Park; Kingston Hospital; Norbiton
- End: Fairfield bus station

Service
- Level: 24-hour service
- Frequency: About every 12 minutes
- Operates: 24-hour service

London Buses route 57 is a Transport for London contracted bus route in London, England. Running between Clapham Park and Fairfield bus station, it is operated by Go-Ahead London subsidiary London General.

== History ==
The 57 service, running from Victoria to Tooting Broadway, via Vauxhall, Stockwell, Lambeth Town Hall, Brixton & Streatham, was first introduced in July 1951, replacing London Tram routes 8 and 20. It took its present route in January 1964.

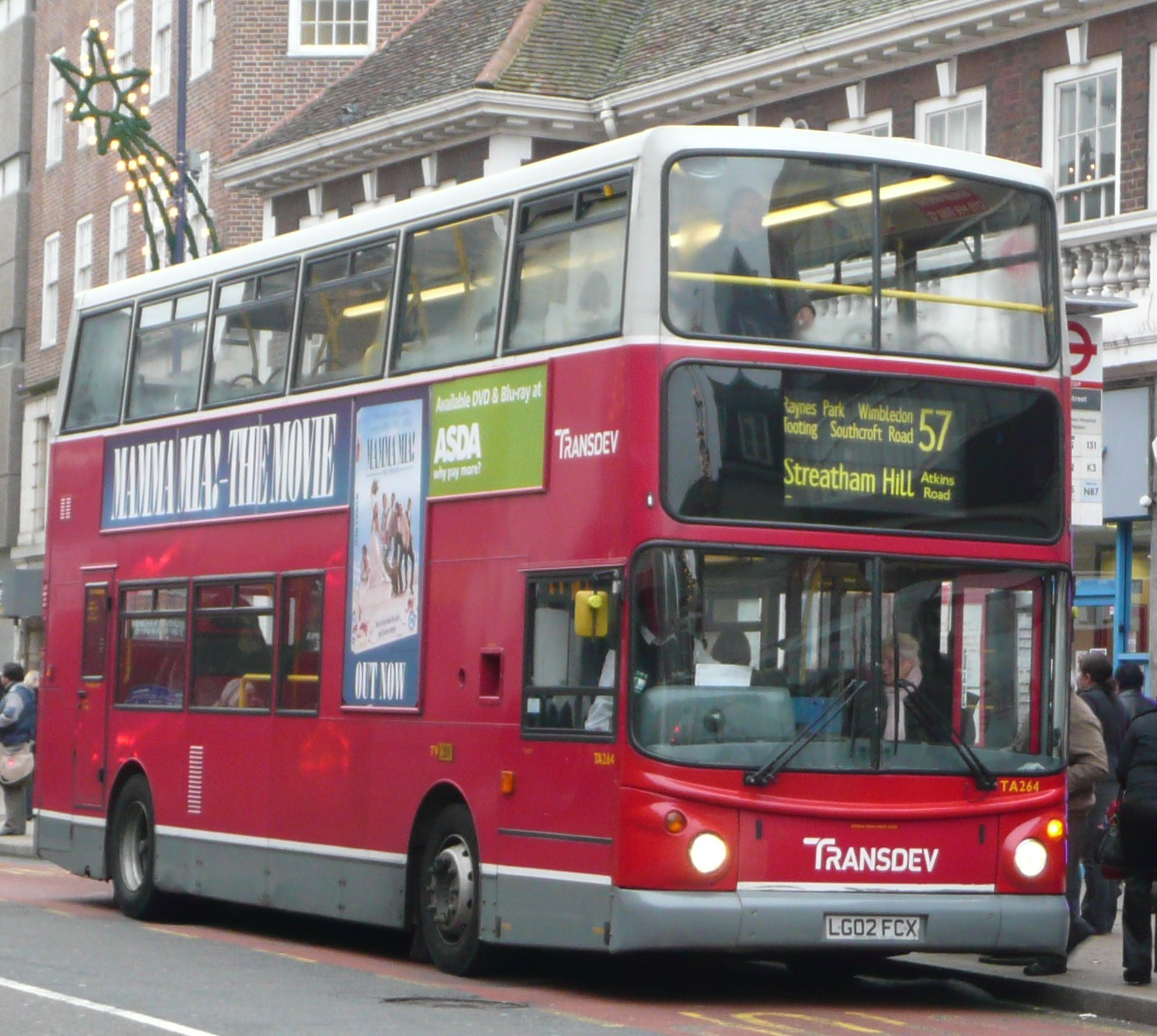
Transdev London Alexander ALX400 bodied Dennis Trident 2 in Kingston in December 2008

In 2015, Go-Ahead London won the tender to run the service, taking over from London United on 2 July 2016. In February 2023, the service frequency was reduced to every 12 minutes.

== Current route ==
Route 57 operates via these primary locations:

- Clapham Park
- Streatham Hill station
- Streatham
- Tooting Broadway station
- Colliers Wood station
- Merton Abbey
- South Wimbledon station
- Wimbledon station
- Raynes Park station
- Kingston Hospital
- Norbiton station
- Fairfield bus station

== Incidents ==
On Friday, 28 November 2014, a woman in her sixties was struck by a number 57 bus in Streatham and pronounced dead at the scene. The driver was arrested on suspicion of careless driving.
