= Quality Line =

Former London bus operator

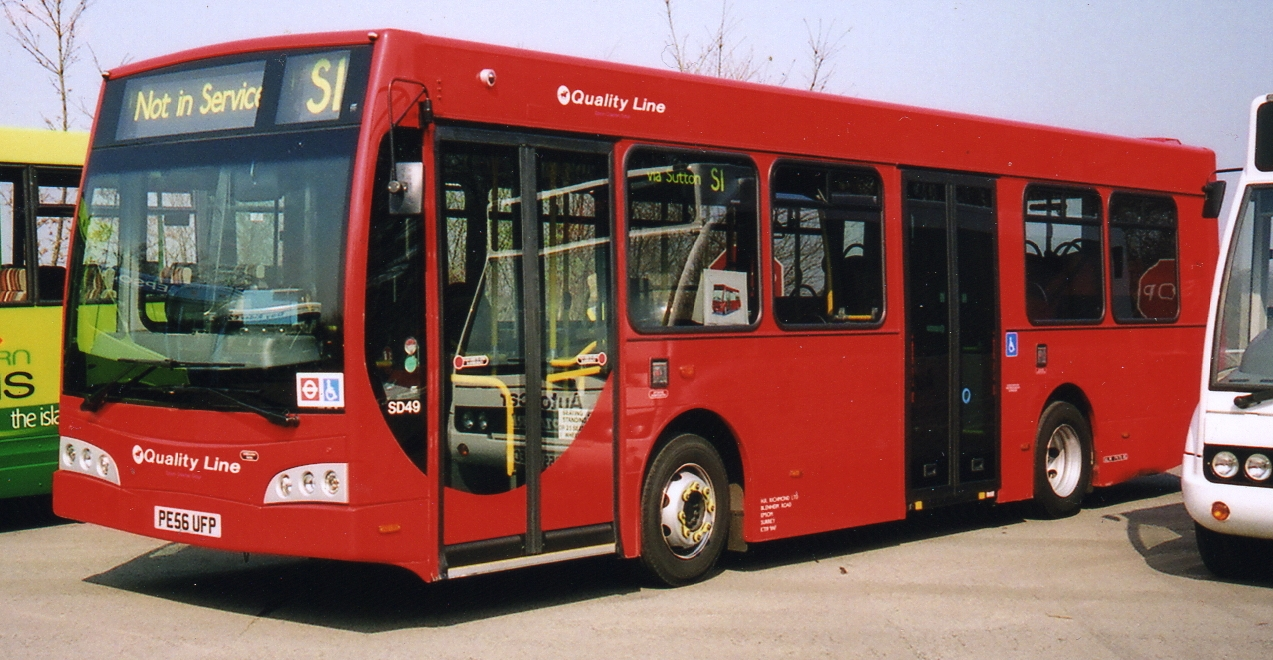
- East Lancs Esteem at the Longcross bus rally in April 2007
- Parent: RATP Group
- Founded: 1986; 40 years ago
- Ceased operation: 2 July 2021; 4 years ago
- Headquarters: Epsom
- Service area: South West London; Surrey
- Service type: Bus services
- Routes: 10
- Destinations: Epsom; Ewell; Morden; Sutton; Hook
- Fleet: 66
- Website: www.ratpdevtransitlondon.com

Quality Line was a bus company based in Epsom, England. A subsidiary of the RATP Group, Quality Line operated bus services throughout the South West London and Surrey area, with many under contract to Transport for London. It ceased operations on 2 July 2021, with all remaining routes transferring to RATP's London United subsidiary.

== History ==
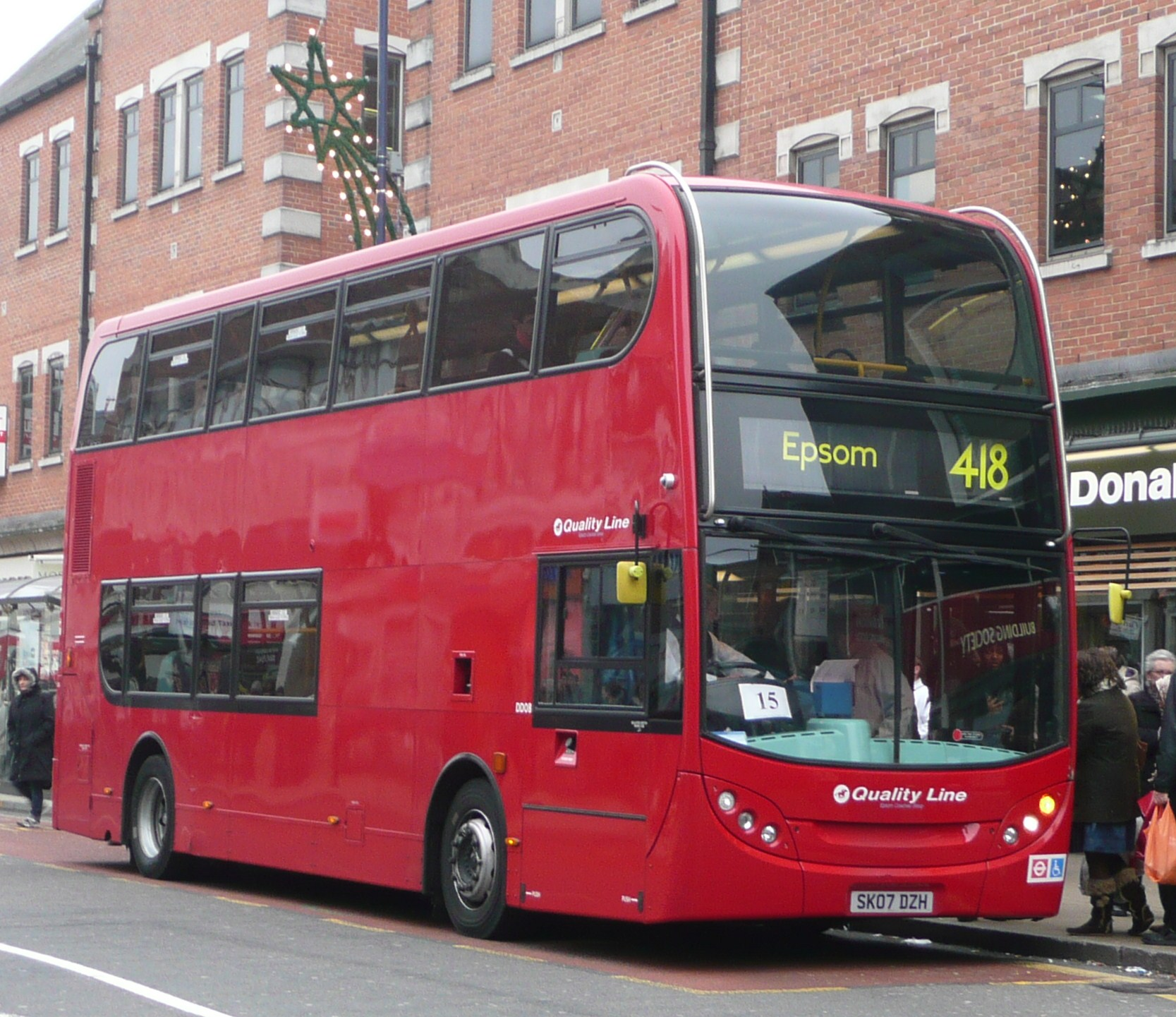
Alexander Dennis Enviro400 on route 418 at Kingston in December 2008

In 1986, Epsom Coaches took advantage of the deregulation of the bus industry, and initially began operating hopper type services around the Epsom area.

In 1997, Epsom Buses expanded into the London Bus market initially winning the tenders for routes S1 and 413 which were operated with Optare MetroRiders later being replaced by Plaxton Pointer bodied Dennis Darts. Other London tenders were successfully tendered for including route 293.

In 2003, Epsom Coaches rebranded its bus division as Quality Line and repainted its vehicles from their traditional cream and brown into all over red to comply with Transport for London contractual requirements.

From July 2006 with the introduction of routes E15 and E16, Quality Line began to return to operating outside London with buses in their traditional cream and brown livery, however since the displacement of Alexander bodied Dennis Darts from route S1, buses outside London have been appearing in red once again. In late 2012 out of London buses were starting to appear in all over cream with burgundy flashes.

Until May 2007, the whole fleet consisted of only single decker buses. Since June 2007, Quality Line have operated Alexander Dennis Enviro400 double-deck vehicles on routes 406 and 418. A number of single decker Alexander Dennis Enviro200 Darts were delivered at the same time.

On 20 April 2012, Epsom Coaches was taken over by the RATP Group.

On 12 October 2012, Quality Line took over the commercial operation of Surrey County Council route 479 from Countryliner, who had gone into administration earlier in the week. On 15 October, a service registration by Sunray Travel was accepted by the Traffic Commissioner, while Quality Line's was not, so it ceased operating the route on 16 October 2012.

On 3 December 2016, the company took over route 413. It was previously operated by Go-Ahead London. The company purchased nine Citaro K buses for the route.

In June 2017 as part of a restructure of RATP's operations, Epsom Coaches ceased trading while the remaining operations continued under the Quality Line brand. It was brought under the same management as RATP's other London operations, London United and London Sovereign.

On 24 April 2020, routes 406, 418 and 465 were transferred to London United's Tolworth garage.

In January 2021, RATP announced that it was to close Quality Line. On 19 June 2021, routes 293, 404, 467 and 470 were transferred to London United. On 2 July 2021, All Quality Line operations ceased after remaining routes 413, 463 and S1 passed to Go-Ahead London at the end of their contracts.
