= Kingston bus stations =

Bus stations in London, England

Cromwell Road Bus Station
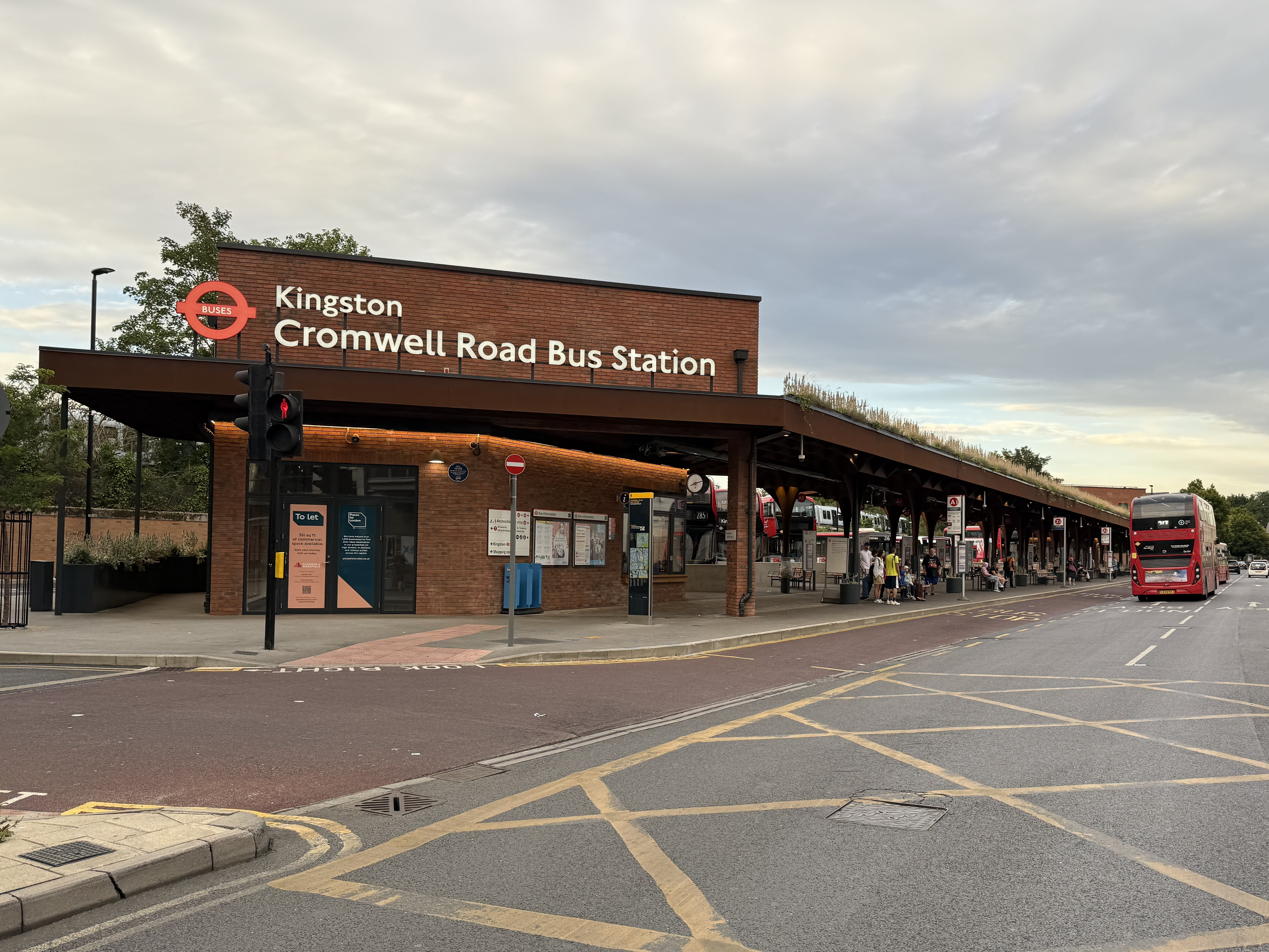
- Cromwell Road bus station in 2025

General information
- Other names: Kingston Cromwell Road Bus Station
- Location: Kingston upon Thames; Kingston
- Coordinates: 51.41250°N 0.29860°W
- Operator: Transport for London
- Bus stands: 17
- Bus operators: London General; London United; Transport UK London Bus; Metroline; Metrobus; Falcon Buses; Reptons Coaches; Stagecoach South; Diamond South East
- Connections: Adjacent to Kingston station

History
- Opened: 15 July 1995; 31 years ago

Key dates
- 2023–2024: Bus station demolished and rebuilt
Location

Fairfield Bus Station
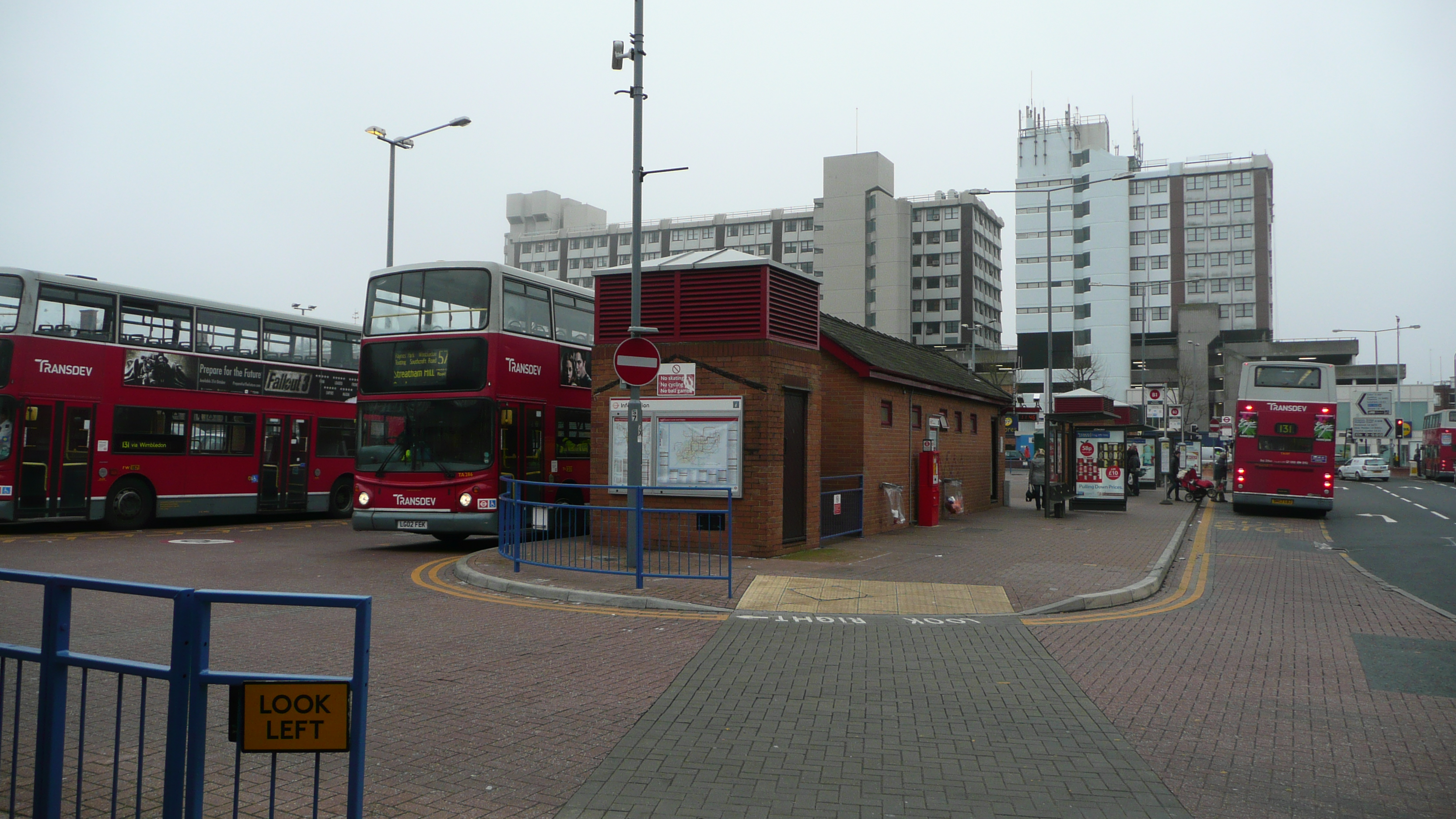
- Fairfield Bus Station

General information
- Other names: Kingston Fairfield Bus Station
- Location: Kingston upon Thames; Kingston
- Coordinates: 51.4100°N 0.2987°W
- Operator: Transport for London
- Bus stands: 7
- Bus operators: London General; London United

History
- Opened: 21 November 1987; 38 years ago
Location

Kingston upon Thames in South West London, England is served by two bus stations as well as a large number of on-street bus stops. Due to the Kingston one-way system, the various stops and bus stations are physically separate, but passengers are able to interchange between routes by walking through Kingston town centre, or walking from Kingston railway station.

== Kingston bus stations ==
=== Cromwell Road bus station ===
Kingston Cromwell Road bus station located close to Kingston railway station. A bus station on the site opened in July 1995, on the site of an old coal yard. Built to replace a 70-year-old facility, it was opened as part of the Kingston Relief Road project, which involved the main shopping streets in Kingston town centre being pedestrianised, and a new one-way system being built around the town centre for traffic. The bus station was designed by in-house London Transport architect Robert Stevenson, and won a Townscape Award from the Kingston upon Thames Society.

The station comprises 12 bus stands, with 5 street stops – making it the largest bus station used by London Buses. The station is owned and maintained by Transport for London. Over 8 million passengers use the bus station every year.

In 2013, TfL announced that the bus station could be rebuilt, as several bus routes no longer terminate at Cromwell Road or Fairfield bus stations owing to lack of capacity. In 2015, planning permission was approved for the demolition of the bus station, and the building of a replacement on the same site.

From 28 August 2023, the bus station was closed temporarily, to allow for construction of the new bus station. The renovation includes wider customer waiting areas, live bus information, retail units, accessible toilets and improved staff accommodation. Construction was completed in November 2024. A blue plaque at the bus station honours Jill Viner, the first woman to drive a London bus in passenger service.

London Buses routes 57, 65, 71, 85, 111, 131, 213, 216, 281, 285, 371, 406, 411, 418, 465, 481, 481D, 671, K1, K2, K3, K4 and K5, Superloop route SL7 and night routes N65 and N87 serve the station. A number of non-TfL buses also serve the station, with destinations outside Greater London in Surrey.

=== Fairfield bus station ===
Kingston Fairfield bus station is located east of the town centre, on the former site of the Kingston cattle market. The bus station opened in 1987, as part of the first phase of the Kingston Relief Road project. Named after the nearby Fairfield Recreation Ground, the bus station was initially known as Cattlemarket Bus Station. It was designed by in-house London Transport architects as well as Kingston Council architects. The bus station sits above an underground multi-storey car park that serves the Fairfield recreation ground and Kingston town centre, and served the adjacent Kingfisher leisure centre before its closure in 2019. Over 2 million passengers use the bus station every year.

London Buses routes 57, 131, 213, K5 and night route N87 serve the station.

== Historic bus stations ==
A bus garage was opened on Cromwell Road by the London General Omnibus Company in 1922. In 1928, an extension added a covered bus stand, known as Kingston bus station. The site was too small to be used as both a bus garage and a bus station, and the bus garage closed in 1984 to allow for more space for the bus station. Following the opening of Cromwell Road bus station in 1995, the site was then used for overnight storage of buses. After over 70 years, the site closed on 17 May 2000 as London United moved to Tolworth bus garage. The site was rebuilt as the Rotunda complex, with an Odeon Cinema, restaurants and tenpin bowling.

As part of the rebuild of Kingston railway station by the Southern Railway in 1935, a bus lay-by was provided outside the station, in which various bus routes terminated. Following opening of the Fairfield bus station, the lay-by was subsequently used as a taxi rank.

== See also ==
- List of bus and coach stations in London
