= London Buses route 406 =

London bus route

406
- London United Wright Eclipse Gemini 3 bodied Volvo B5LH in Kingston upon Thames in September 2026

Overview
- Operator: London United (First Bus London)
- Garage: Tolworth
- Vehicle: Volvo B5LH Wright Gemini 3
- Peak vehicle requirement: 7
- Predecessors: Route S6
- Night-time: No night service

Route
- Start: Epsom
- Via: Ewell; Tolworth; Surbiton
- End: Cromwell Road bus station
- Length: 8 miles (13 km)

Service
- Level: Daily
- Frequency: About every 20-30 minutes
- Journey time: 35-53 minutes
- Operates: 05:45 until 00:15

London Buses route 406 is a Transport for London contracted bus route in London and Surrey, England. Running between Epsom and Cromwell Road bus station, it is operated by First Bus London subsidiary London United.

== History ==
A bus route was established in 1920 between Epsom and Redhill by the East Surrey Traction Company (ESTC), extending to Kingston in 1922. This initially ran without a route number, before gaining the S6 number in 1921. Following the introduction of the Bassom Scheme, which aimed to introduce consistent route numbering, the S6 was renumbered as the 406 in 1924.

In 1929, the ESTC was taken over by the London General Omnibus Company, which in turn was taken over by the London Passenger Transport Board in 1933.

By the winter of 1949/50, the AEC Regent III RTs began running on the 406, which at its peak required 22 RTs to operate the service. In 1957, the second prototype AEC Routemaster ran on route 406 between Redhill and Kingston.

Following the privatisation of London bus services the 406 became part of London Country South West as a commercial route, the company later rebranding as Arriva Guildford & West Surrey by 1998, operating from their garages at Crawley and Merstham.

In 1991, the 406 was diverted at Surbiton Hill Road via Surbiton railway station to Kingston. It was also shortened to operate mainly between Kingston and Epsom, with a handful of peak journeys continuing to Redhill. The 406 ran at four buses an hour at this time, with two continuing to Walton-on-the-Hill.

On 27 January 2001 the 406 was split in two: the Kingston to Epsom section became a tendered Transport for London route with London United's Hounslow garage taking over operation, retaining the 406 number, while the Epsom to Redhill section was renumbered route 460, presently operated by Metrobus. A proposal to extend the 406 to Teddington in 2001 was not received favourably by residents and did not proceed.

Upon being re-tendered, on 30 June 2007 it passed to Quality Line with new Alexander Dennis Enviro400s. It was the first double deck contract won by Quality Line. The route was diverted via Surbiton Hill Road instead of Surbiton station at the same time, thus the route was restored to its original routing.

In 2016 a petition was launched calling for the route to run overnight.

On 24 April 2020, route 406 along with routes 418 and 465 were transferred to London United operating from their Tolworth bus garage.

On 28 February 2025, the route passed from London United to First Bus London following the acquisition of RATP Dev Transit London by FirstGroup.

== Current route ==
Route 406 operates via these primary locations:

- Epsom
- Epsom station
- Ewell
- Stoneleigh
- Tolworth station
- Surbiton
- Kingston University
- Cromwell Road bus station
