= NSL (company) =

British outsourcing company

- Founded: 2007

NSL is an outsourcing company formed in early 2007 by the demerger of NCP into two separate businesses. It provides parking services, bus and coach operations, city centre CCTV monitoring, back office processing, streetscape consultancy and debt recovery.

The company first demerged as NCP Services in 2007, and became NSL Services Group in April 2009. In January 2017 NSL was acquired by Marston Holdings.

== Services ==
=== Passenger transport ===
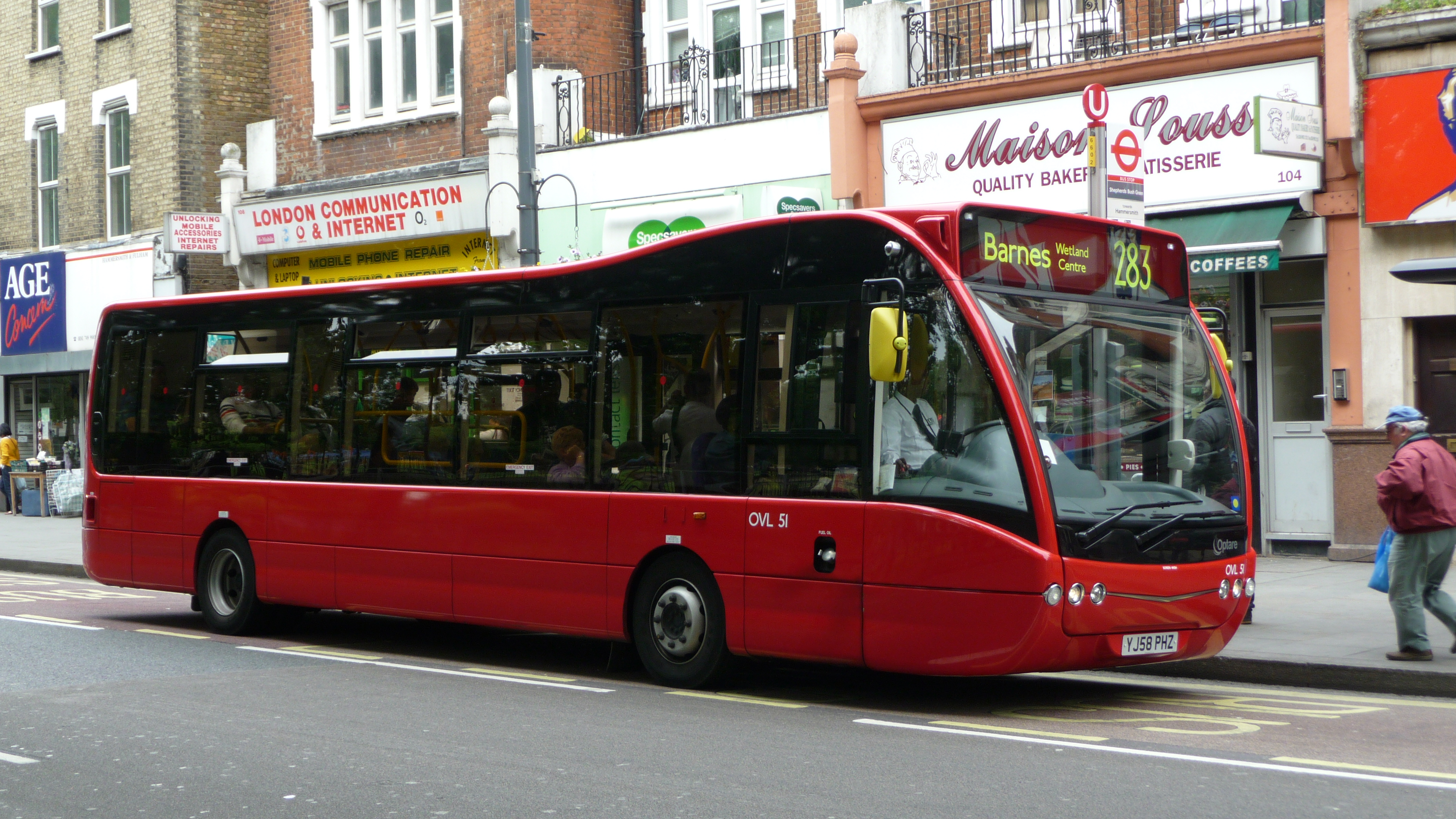
Optare Versa at Shepherd's Bush Green on route 283 in June 2009

NCP Challenger commenced trading on 12 November 2005, having successfully tendered to operate routes 33 and 419 under contract to Transport for London.

In April 2009, NCP Challenger was rebranded NSL Buses. On 13 November 2009, NSL buses was sold to Transdev with operations taken over by its London United subsidiary.

=== Patient transport ===
NSL patient transport includes services for non-emergency, high-dependency, bariatric and secure/mental health patients. NSL is the largest private non-emergency patient transport provider in the UK, transporting over 2m patients to and from their appointments every year. NSL is a member of the Independent Ambulance Association (IAA).

It was chosen by NHS Kent and Medway in January 2013 to provide non-emergency patient transport.

=== Other services ===
NSL also provide a number of other services. These include:

- Park and ride sites in Oxford and Durham.
- Planning and designing "streetscapes" through its consultancy arm, Project Centre.
- Traffic rule enforcement, parking and traffic attendants.
- Care services: patient transfers to the NHS.

== Criticism ==
At a January 2012 employment tribunal, NSL was described as "predatory and dishonest".

NSL has been subject to investigation into unfair practices by Channel 4's Cutting Edge programme.

Westminster Council CEOs (outsourced to NSL) have also been filmed using illegal tactics to block cars.

In January 2014 The Care Quality Commission (CQC) said the service did not meet mandatory standards in four out of five areas. It found patients had experienced long waits and some staff had not undergone criminal record checks. In April 2014 the clinical commissioning groups in Kent agreed to provide an extra £1.6m for their contract as part of a "last chance" deal to improve its performance. Ian Ayres, chief officer for West Kent Clinical Commissioning Group, which manages the contract on behalf of eight CCGs in Kent and Medway told the Kent County Council Scrutiny Committee; "the information which was available to commissioners drawing up the invitation to tender was incomplete, and therefore so was the specification."
