= Arriva Guildford & West Surrey =

British bus operating company

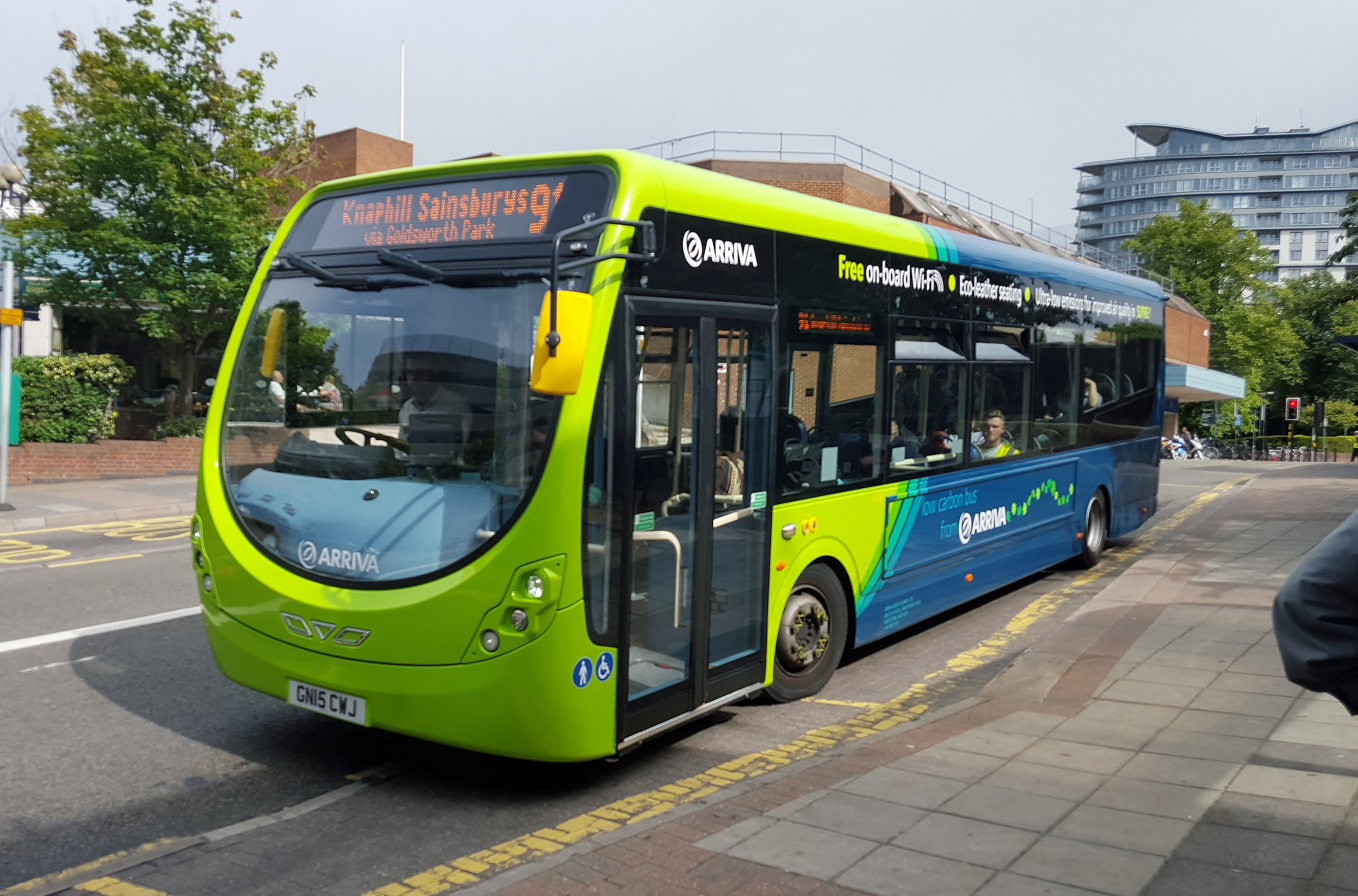
- Wright StreetLite in Woking in 2015
- Parent: Arriva
- Founded: 1997; 29 years ago
- Ceased operation: 18 December 2021; 4 years ago
- Headquarters: Guildford
- Service area: Surrey; West Sussex
- Service type: Bus
- Depots: 3
- Operator: Arriva Southern Counties
- Website: www.arrivabus.co.uk

Arriva Guildford & West Surrey Limited, which traded as Arriva Guildford & West Surrey, was a bus operator based in Guildford, England. It was a subsidiary of Arriva. The company operated services in West Sussex and Surrey, as part of the Arriva Southern Counties division. Services that were run were primarily centred on hubs at Guildford, Woking and Cranleigh. Services ceased on 18 December 2021.

== History ==
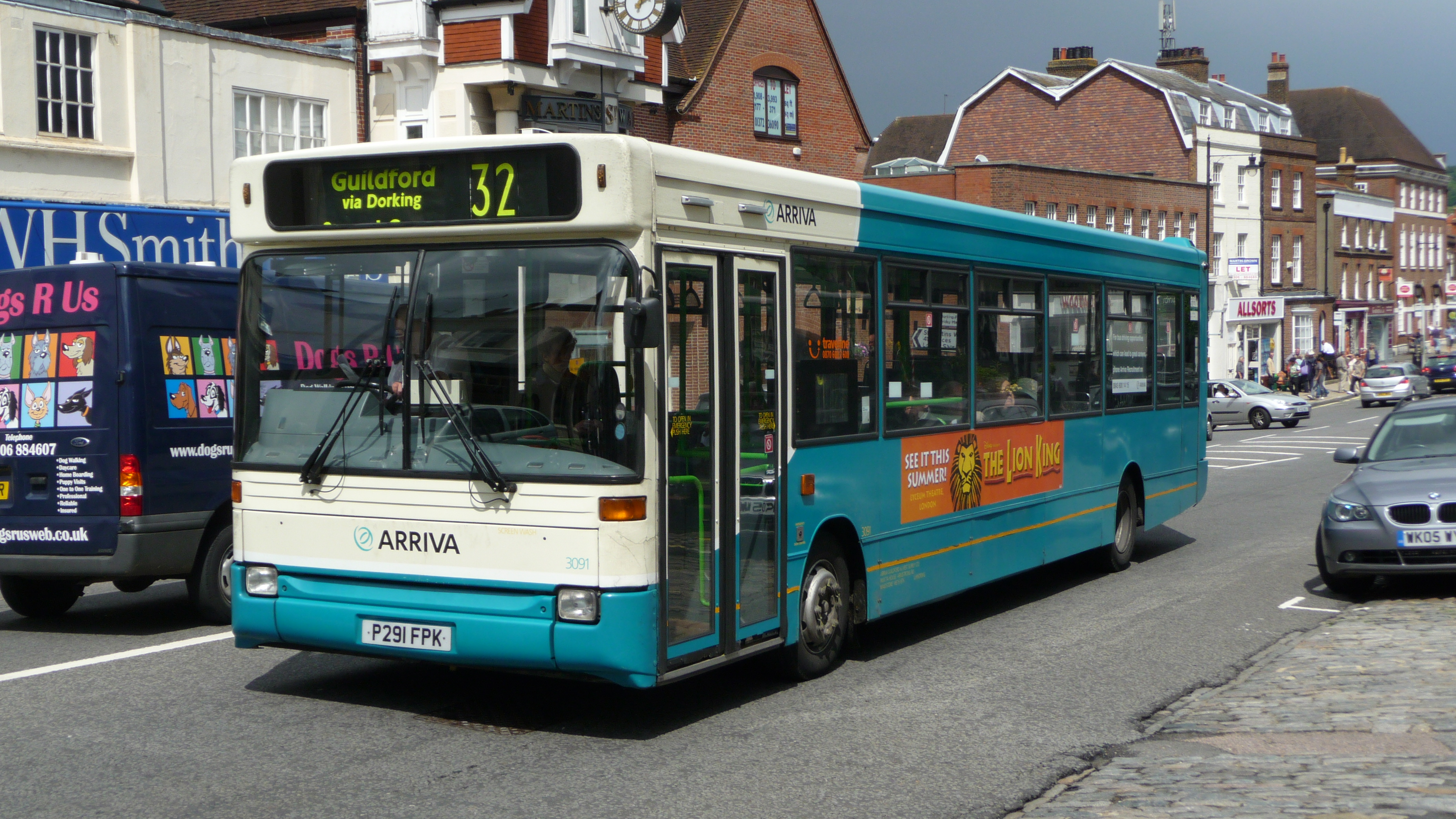
Plaxton Pointer bodied Dennis Dart SLF in Dorking, en route to Guildford in July 2009

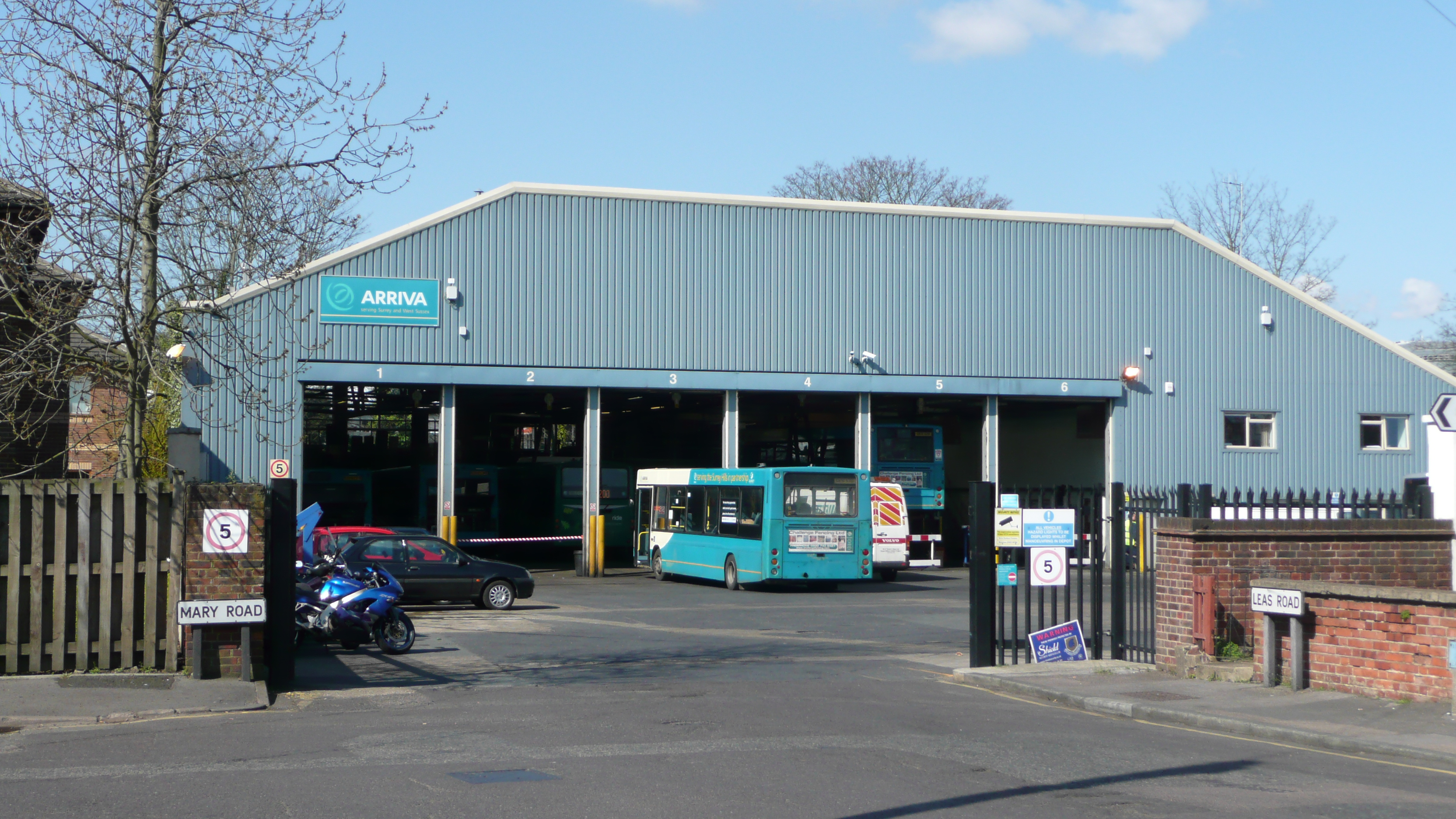
Arriva Guildford & West Surrey's main bus depot in Guildford

The Guildford & West Surrey brand name was first created in 1990 when the Guildford operations of the newly-privatised Alder Valley bus company were sold to London & Country, owned by the Drawlane Group, L&C itself a rebranding of the London Country South West NBC subsidiary. Buses in the area began to wear the Guildford & West Surrey fleet name and livery in London & Country's livery.

The company was renamed Arriva Guildford & West Surrey Ltd in 2001, although with the launch of the Arriva corporate brand, buses were being repainted into the corporate livery several years prior, initially with the strapline serving Surrey and West Sussex. The company was later incorporated into the Arriva Southern Counties division, dropping the strapline, and traded as Arriva Southern Counties.

At the end of February 2002, the company closed its Woking depot, with routes and vehicles transferring to the Guildford depot. At the same time, two Guildford-based routes (418 and 479) were withdrawn for being uneconomical, having lost out to London Buses-contracted routes that covered the same sections of road.

On 7 March 2007, the Arriva West Sussex licence (operating buses from a depot in Horsham) was not continued, with the vehicles at Horsham transferring to the Arriva Guildford & West Surrey licence. However, it was announced in September 2009 that the Horsham operations would be sold to Metrobus, with all routes transferring to Crawley depot. All staff and 19 single-decker buses were transferred to Metrobus from 3 October 2009. Arriva maintained a presence in Horsham through hourly route 63 (Guildford - Horsham), which was operated by Cranleigh depot, though it was amended to remove a local section of route in Horsham.

On 2 May 2017, a new express route (numbered X1) was introduced between Horsham and Guildford, going through Broadbridge Heath, Clemsfold, Alfold, Bramley and Shalford. This was short-lived, however, as it was withdrawn on 10 March 2018.

Commencing 4 November 2018, Arriva launched routes A (to/from Royal Surrey County Hospital), B (to/from the Park Barn Estate) and C (to/from Stoughton) to rival the existing routes already operated by Stagecoach South and Safeguard Coaches.

In March 2019, Arriva commercially took over the route 479 between Guildford and Epsom after its operator, Buses Excetera, ceased trading at short notice.

In October 2021, Arriva announced they planned to close the single remaining depot in Guildford, following a decline in passenger numbers and the operation being deemed unsustainable, ceasing operations on 17 December 2021. From that date, six routes were taken over by Stagecoach South, with routes 36 and 37 being replaced by a new route 6 and an extension to the existing route 1. Additionally, route 18 and Sunday service on route 3 were transferred to Safeguard, with the 18 extended to Merrow and Bushy Hill to cover the gaps on the remainder of the former routes 36 and 37. Routes 436 and 479 were transferred to Falcon Buses. Route A was withdrawn without replacement from 14 November 2021.

== Operating area ==
The company operated in parts of West Sussex as well as Surrey. The route network is centred on hubs at Guildford and Woking with Cranleigh also seeing regular service. Services also reached the towns of Weybridge, Horsham, Camberley and Epsom.

== Guildford Park & Ride ==
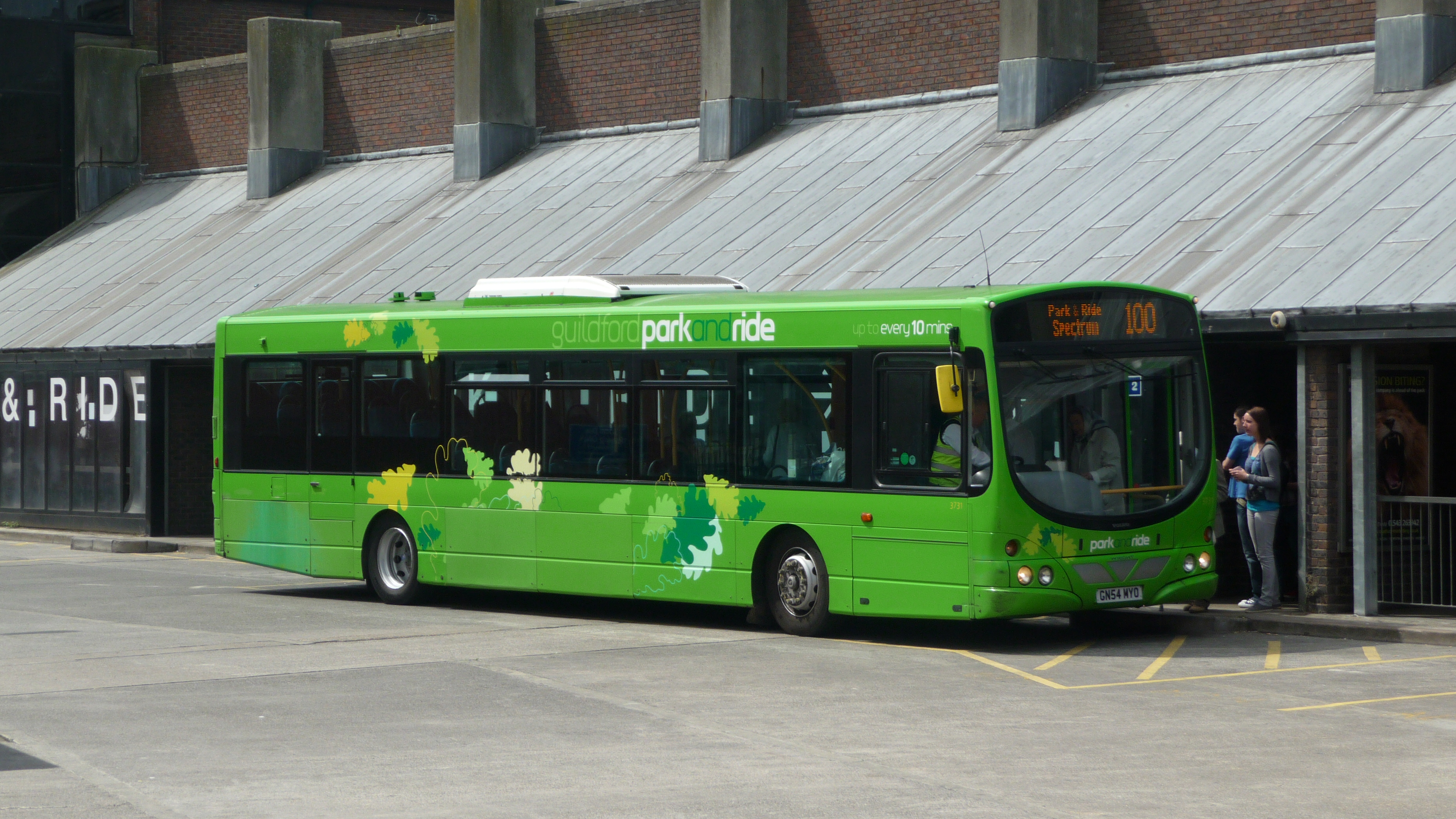
One of five Volvo B7RLE/Wright Eclipse Urbans used on the Guildford Park & Ride. This is 3731, seen in its old livery, painted light green to represent spring.

Arriva operated a part of the Guildford park and ride service for Surrey County Council. Arriva ran the services from Spectrum Leisure Centre for route 100 and Artington for route 200.

Previously, a Saturday-only service from the Allianz Cornhill offices at Ladymead (numbered 101) ran instead of the Spectrum Leisure Centre car park on Saturdays, since the Spectrum car park was too small as a park and ride facility. However, the route 101 ended on 26 March 2011, following a council spending cut, leaving no park and ride service from the northern side of Guildford on Saturdays.

== Liveries ==
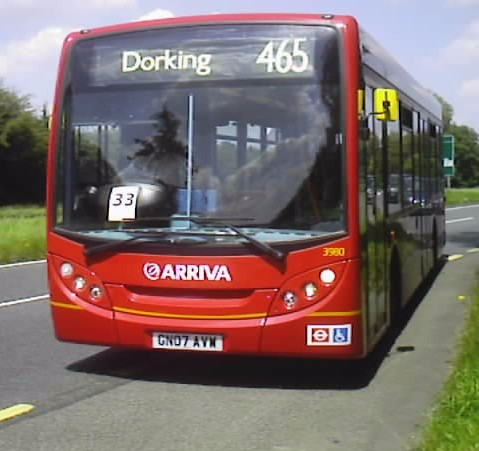
A Horsham-based bus on route 465, at the foot of Box Hill

Most buses in the fleet are painted in either the previous standard Arriva UK bus livery of aquamarine with a large cotswold stone swoop at the front, or the newer "interurban" livery with dark blue skirts and smaller "cow's horn" at the front. Arriva changed its livery policy in 2009, making the previous "interurban" livery the standard livery, with repaints and new deliveries entering service in this livery.

Special liveries included the three Mercedes-Benz Citaros used on route 436, which wore a blue and silver scheme in the style of the old Arriva livery, with a base metallic silver and a blue swoop. The Guildford Park & Ride buses were painted into a purple based oak leaf livery in the first part of 2011, matching the branding used by Surrey County Council for park and ride services. Previously, the buses were painted in the same oak leaf style but in a variety of different base colours: lime green (representing spring), dark green (summer), blue (winter), brown (autumn) and pink (spare).

As per Transport for London contract stipulations, the buses used on London Buses route 465 carried the all over London red version of the Arriva livery, as used by Arriva London, although this livery no longer features in the fleet after Horsham depot was sold to Metrobus along with operation of route 465. The London red livery saw a brief reprieve in April 2011, when two Mini Pointer Darts were temporarily drafted in to Guildford depot after several routes were taken on from Countryliner at short notice.

Five of the six Enviro200 Darts carried route branding for route 91, and a handful of DAF SB120s had route branding for routes 34 and 35. Various Darts had orange-based branding for University of Surrey routes, and a pair of Darts also carried branding for routes 42 and 44.

In 2006, as was done in other Arriva locations, Arriva painted one its buses in a centenary livery reminiscent of the Aldershot & District Traction Company. The bus has since re-gained the standard livery.

A new livery and logo was introduced nationally in 2018 and many buses were repainted that way.

== Depots ==
Guildford was the location of the main bus garage of the company, an outstation was maintained at Cranleigh before being closed in 2012. A second depot was previously maintained in Warnham for Horsham operations until operations transferred to Metrobus in 2009.

== Fleet ==
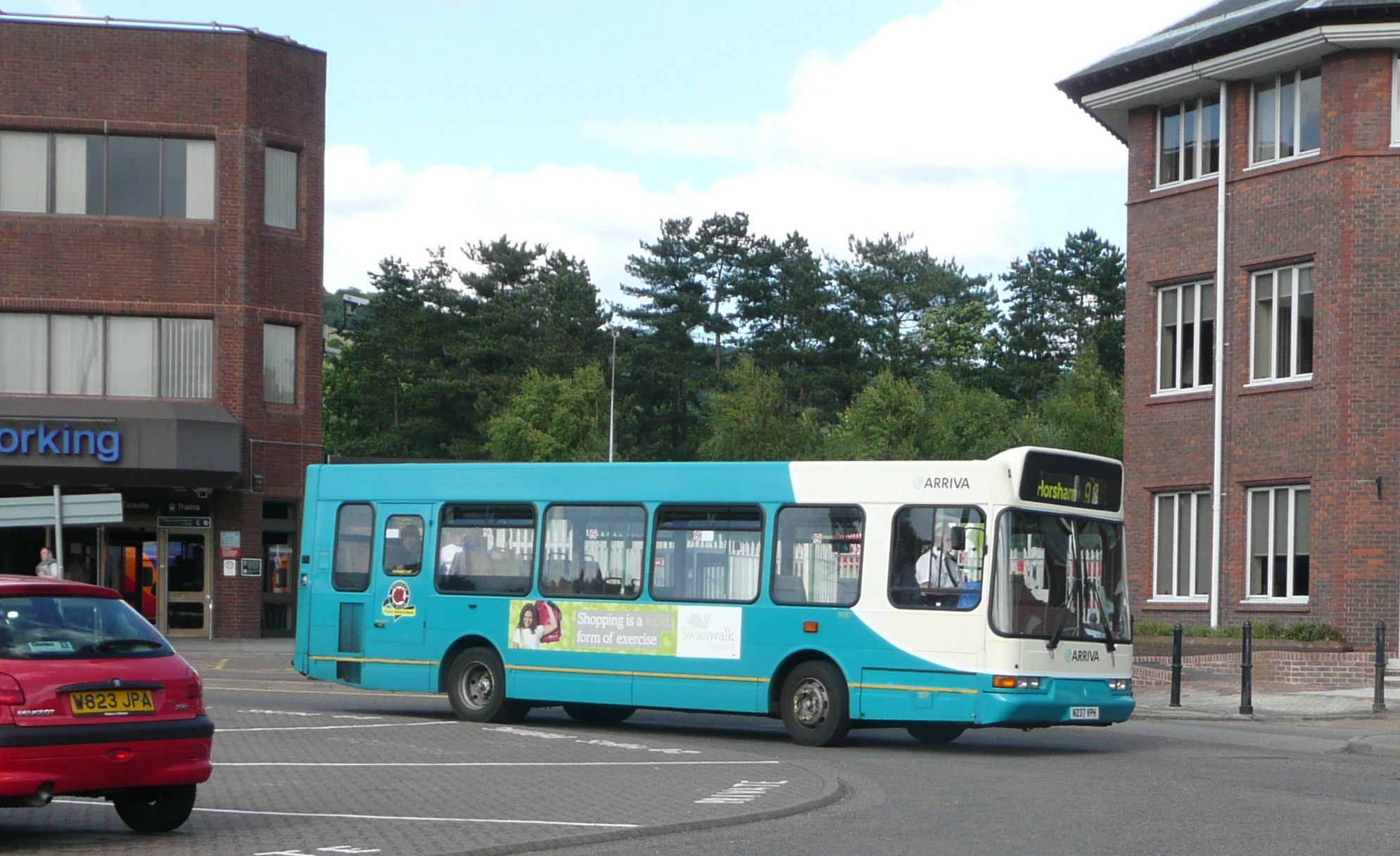
A Horsham-based Dennis Dart SLF/East Lancs Spryte in Dorking. This was moved away to another part of Arriva Southern Counties before Horsham depot was sold.

The fleet in Guildford were mainly low floor Dennis Dart/Plaxton Pointers, including a couple of examples with Pointer 2 bodywork. Making up the other main part of the fleet were DAF SB120/Wright Cadets. A batch arrived in 2001 for Surrey Hills routes, followed by another batch in 2002 for routes 34 and 35. Five Volvo B7RLE/Wright Eclipse Urbans were bought in 2004 for Guildford Park and Ride services. Another newer VDL SB120/Wright Cadet arrived in 2006, diverted from an order for Arriva Yorkshire, to replace a 2002 example that was burnt out. Later that year three Mercedes-Benz Citaros arrived for route 436 to Mercedes-Benz World. In early 2009 a fleet of six Alexander Dennis Enviro200 Darts were put into route on route 91. In mid-2009, the final two Dennis Dominators with East Lancs bodywork at Guildford (part of the last batch ever built), were transferred to Maidstone, replaced by two Volvo B7TL/Alexander ALX400s, displaced from Gillingham. A Volvo Olympian/Northern Counties Palatine, which was Horsham's double decker, operated from Guildford for a while after Horsham's depot's sale, before moving on to Cranleigh on the 43/45 school routes.

Arriva's "Bus of the future" had operated from Guildford most of its life. New in 2002, it is a Volvo B7L/Wright Eclipse. However, in 2009 it moved to Northfleet garage, before going to Arriva Shires & Essex.

With significant growth from Stagecoach in the area amid the "Guildford bus war" many new buses were brought to the area, including Optare Versas, Alexander Dennis Enviro200 MMCs and Wright StreetLites. However, to comply with emission regulations elsewhere nearer the capital, particularly for Arriva Kent Thameside, some of the newer examples were moved out of Guildford.

== See also ==
- List of bus operators of the United Kingdom
