= London United Busways =

Bus company in west and south-west London

London United
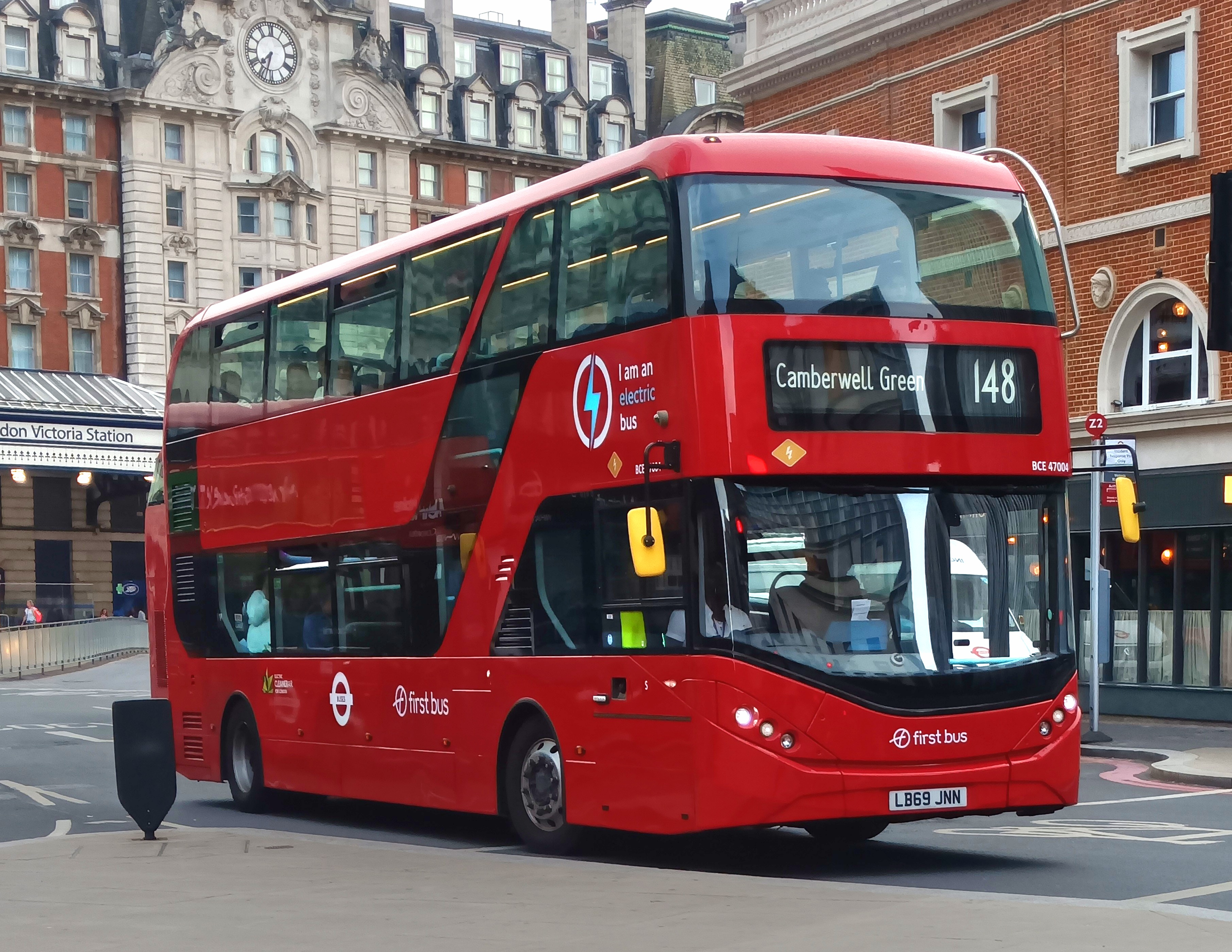
- BYD Alexander Dennis Enviro400EV on route 148 at Victoria station
- Parent: First Bus London
- Founded: 1 April 1989; 37 years ago
- Headquarters: Stamford Brook Garage
- Service area: Greater London
- Service type: Bus services
- Routes: 47
- Depots: 6
- Fleet: 797 (May 2015)
- Website: www.firstbus.co.uk/london

London United is a bus operator brand under First Bus London Limited, trading as First Bus London. London United is a bus company which operates bus services mostly in west and south-west London and north Surrey. It is currently a subsidiary of First Bus London and operates services under contract to Transport for London.

== Company history ==
=== Early history ===
Original London United logo

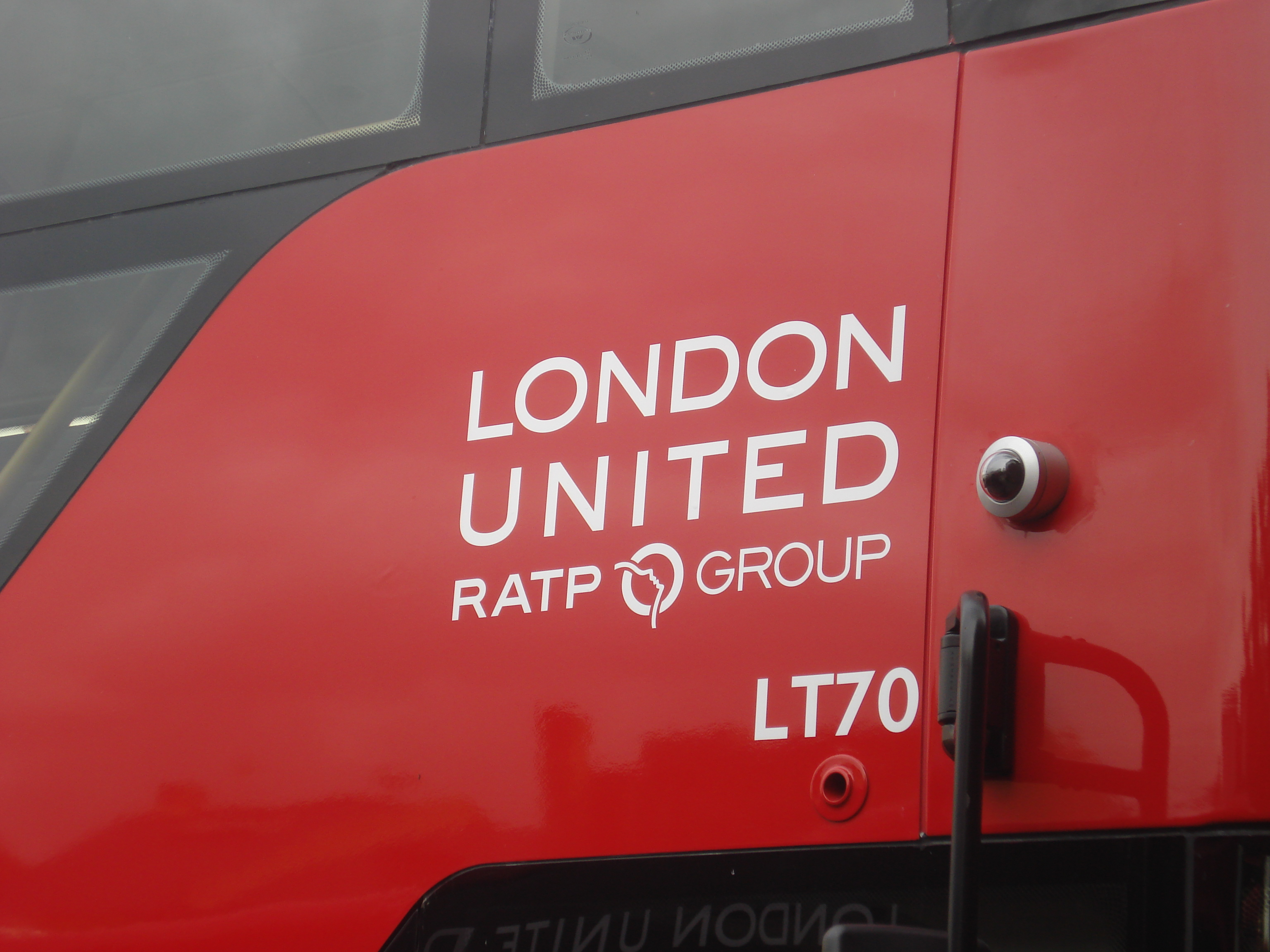
London United RATP Group logo

London United commenced operating on 1 April 1989, as one of 12 operating subsidiaries of London Buses in preparation for privatisation. In November 1994 it was sold in a management buyout.

The company's name was derived from the former London United Tramways, that operated trams and trolleybuses in west and south west London until absorbed by the London Passenger Transport Board in 1933. London United adopted the former tram company's insignia, based on the coat of arms of the City of London, as its logo.

In January 1995, London United purchased Westlink with garages in Hounslow Heath and Kingston upon Thames.

In August 1997 London United was sold to Transdev. In 2002 Transdev purchased fellow London operator London Sovereign from the Blazefield Group.

In April 2006 both operations were rebranded with the Transdev name and logo, removing the London United and London Sovereign brands, although both companies continued as separate legal entities.

In November 2009 Transdev purchased NCP Challenger with seven Transport for London contracted routes, 87 buses and garages at Park Royal and Twickenham. These were integrated into the London United business.

=== RATP Dev era ===
In 2009, Transdev's majority owner, Caisse des dépôts et consignations, commenced negotiating with Veolia Environnement to merge Transdev with Veolia Transport. As part of the resulting agreement, it was agreed that the RATP Group, which had a minority shareholding in Transdev, would take over ownership of some of Transdev's operations in lieu of cash payment.

This resulted in London United transferring to the RATP Group, while London Sovereign remained with Transdev and become part of the merged Veolia Transdev group.

This agreement took effect in March 2011, and RATP Group renamed its newly acquired business London United.

In 2015, a charter unit was established under the United Transit brand with a grey and red livery.

Since July 2021, London United has taken on most routes from RATP Group's other London subsidiary Quality Line, with routes 413, 463 and S1 being transferred to Go-Ahead London.

In December 2021, RATP's London bus operations including London United were transferred to an RATP joint venture with Australia's Kelsian Group (parent company of Tower Transit) known as RATP Dev Transit London.

=== FirstGroup era ===
In February 2025, London United was included in the acquisition of RATP Dev Transit London by FirstGroup, becoming part of First Bus London.

== Garages ==
London United operates six bus garages.

=== Fulwell (FW) ===
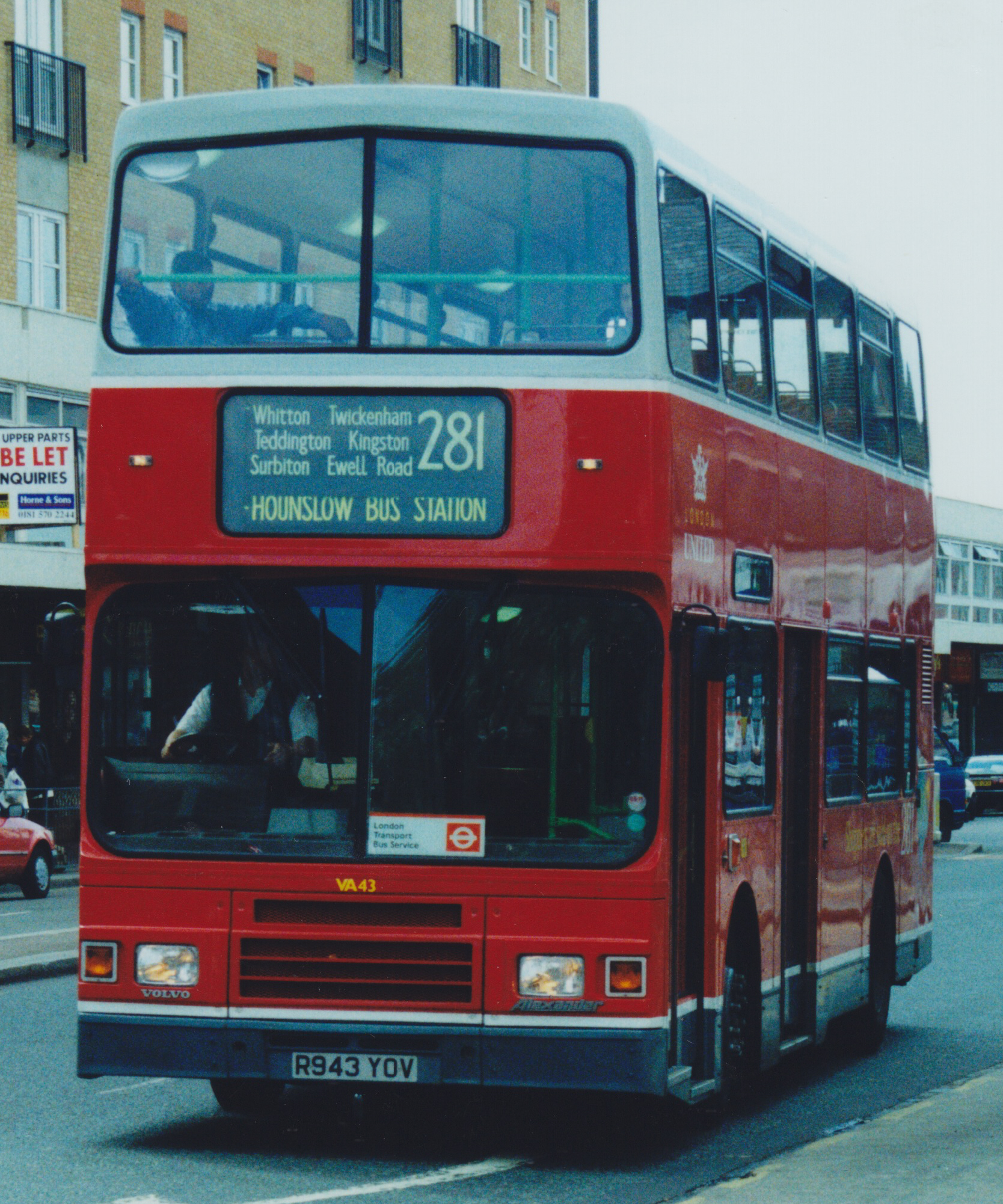
Alexander RH bodied Volvo Olympian on route 281 in Hounslow in original London United livery in September 1998

Fulwell garage operates routes 33, 65, 71, 216, 281, 290, 371, 681, K3, N33 and N65.

=== History ===
When new, the 11-acre (4.5 ha) site was described as one of the finest plants in the country and was the main depot of London United Tramways with 20 covered tracks. The garage is nowadays divided into two sections, one used by London United, with an entrance off Wellington Road, and the other by Transport UK London Bus with an entrance off Stanley Road.

Fulwell was the first garage in London to receive trolleybuses in 1931, and together with Isleworth was the last to operate them until 1962. The last trams operated from the depot in 1935, although some of the tram tracks were, until recently, still visible in the cobbled surface of the Stanley Road entrance. The garage has never reached its capacity, even taking in much of the work from Twickenham when it closed in 1970, and in 2001 107 buses were allocated. In 1999 the garage housed 13 London Country buses after Arriva Croydon & North Surrey shut its Leatherhead garage. The buses on route 85 were operated from the forecourt with Arriva drivers.

=== Hounslow (AV) ===
Hounslow garage operates routes 110, 117, 203, 419, 696, H22, H37 and H98.

Hounslow garage was opened by the London General Omnibus Company in 1913 on the former site of the District Railway's Hounslow Town station. The garage along with many others was requisitioned in the First World War. Hounslow was the subject of two firsts in 1925 and 1930 with the first pneumatic tyre buses and the original Dennis Dart allocated respectively. The garage had one problem though: the roof was too low and only open toppers and single deck vehicles could use the depot until the mid-1930s when the roof was raised.

A London Transport survey in 1947 found that 92 vehicles were allocated to Hounslow, a garage with a capacity of 72. This was mainly achieved by parking buses on a plot of land behind the garage that was also used to stand vehicles terminating there on layover. The garage was rebuilt in the early 1950s and included a new bus station in front of the garage. The planned allocation was now up to 120 vehicles, although the allocation in 2002 was 127.

Hounslow's first one-man operated double deckers were MCW Metrobuses delivered in 1982 for routes 111 and 202. With the allocation still high, Hounslow runs a number of night services on behalf of other First Bus London garages to enable it to fit the buses into the garage. It was also the first garage in London to operate a low-floor bus with the arrival of Wright Pathfinder bodied Dennis Lance SLF in December 1993.

There were plans to relocate the garage away from the town centre and allow the expansion of the adjoining bus station. In 2005, Transport for London submitted a planning application for a new depot to be built on the site of the former Williams Dye Works along Hanworth Road. The application was eventually abandoned by TfL in 2009 largely due to a campaign by residents overlooking the site, who feared the new garage would cause pollution in the area and advocated for a new park to instead occupy the site.

=== Hounslow Heath (WK) ===
Hounslow Heath garage operate routes 105, 116, 235, 395 and 423.

=== Shepherd's Bush (S) ===
Shepherd's Bush garage operates routes 49, 70, 72, 94, 148, C1 and N72.

Shepherd's Bush garage opened in 1906.

=== Stamford Brook (V) ===
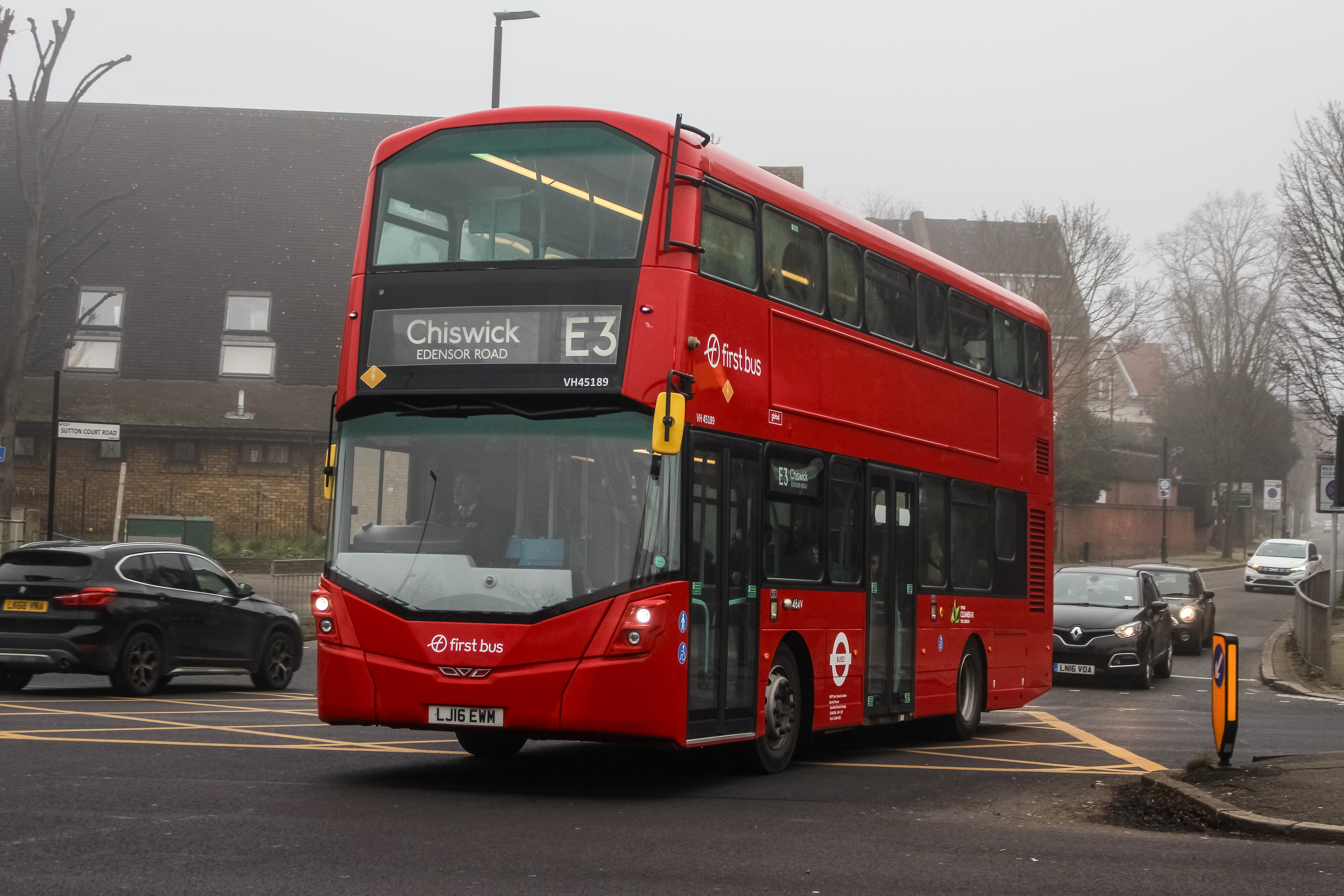
Wright Gemini 3 bodied Volvo B5LH on route E3 in Chiswick in March 2025

Stamford Brook garage operates routes 209, 220, 272, 440 and E3.

Stamford Brook opened as a bus garage in 1980 after a two-year construction. Originally built as Chiswick Tram depot, it had latterly been used to operate the British European Airways bus service between Heathrow Airport and the West London Air Terminal on Cromwell Road.

The original plan was to create a temporary home for the Riverside garage buses and staff whilst that garage was re-built with a view to taking on the workload from Mortlake and Turnham Green which were to close. However this idea was changed and the garage took on the work from Turnham Green which closed and also inherited the garage code V. Following service reductions, Mortlake and Riverside closed in 1983, with some of their work moving to Stamford Brook.

In 1981 Stamford Brook took on Airbus routes A1 and A2 following the withdrawal of the existing British Airways services between Heathrow Airport and central London. These vehicles were transferred in 1994 to West Ramp (which became an outstation of V) leaving the garage with an allocation of MCW Metroriders, MCW Metrobuses, Leyland Olympians and Dennis Darts.

=== Tolworth (TV) ===
Tolworth garage operates routes 85, 293, 406, 411, 418, 613, 662, 665, K1, K2, K4 and K5.

Tolworth was built on the site of a former coal yard behind Tolworth railway station.

Tolworth was originally planned in the late 1990s following the closure of Kingston Garage and the announcement that the site was to be part sold off and part converted into the new bus station. A recruitment centre was opened on Tolworth Broadway long before building work ever started.

Route K5 transferred to Tolworth from Quality Line on 25 January 2020. Routes 406, 418 and 465 transferred to Tolworth from Quality Line on 25 April 2020.

== Former garages ==
=== Twickenham (NC) ===
==== History ====
Twickenham garage was opened by NCP Challenger on 12 November 2005.

On 31 March 2012, route 493 passed to London General.

== Fleet ==
As at May 2015, the fleet consisted of 797 buses.
