= Epsom Coaches =

British bus operating company

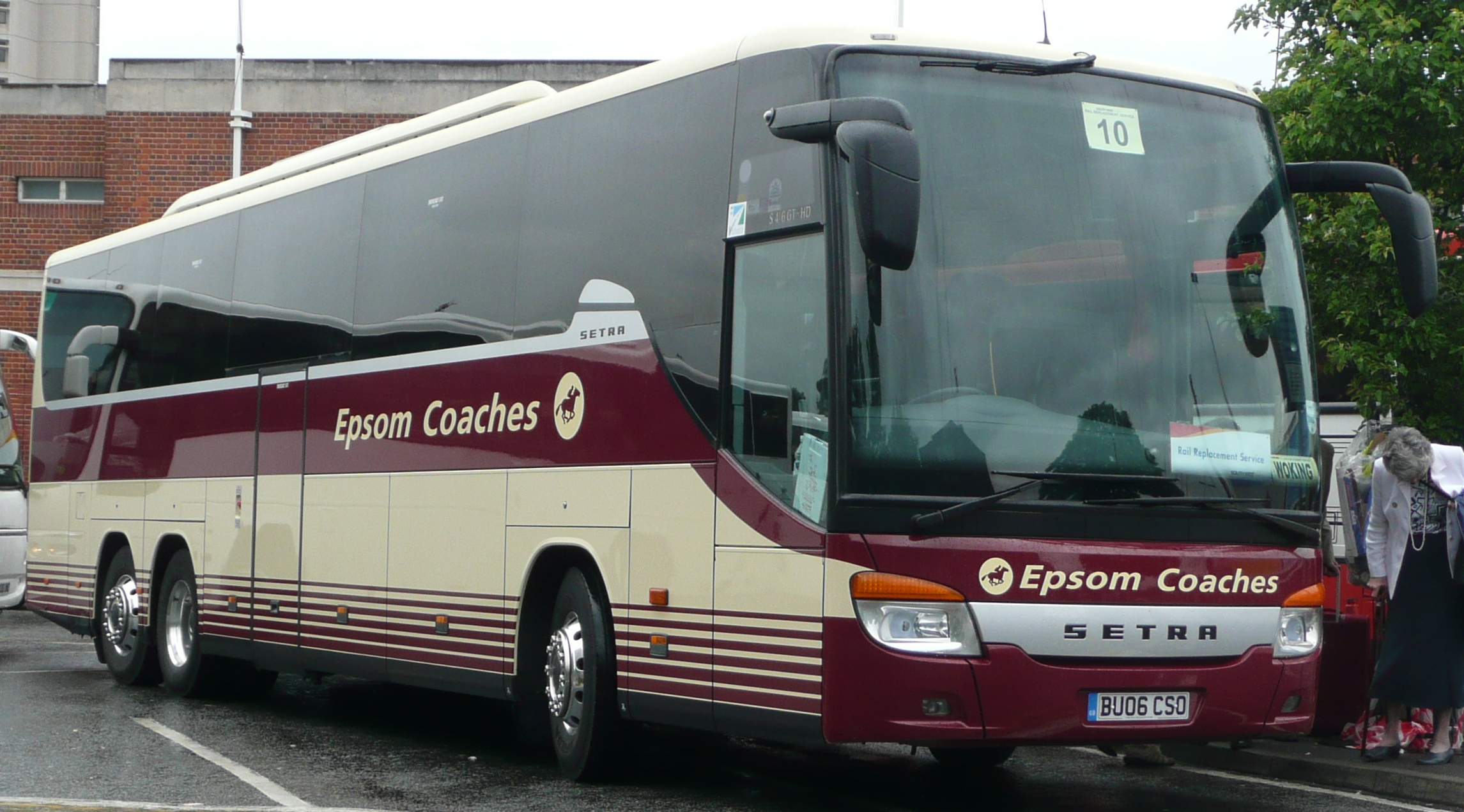
- Setra coach at Woking in May 2008
- Parent: RATP Group
- Founded: 1920
- Ceased operation: 25 June 2017
- Headquarters: Epsom
- Service type: Bus & coach operator
- Fleet: 115 (April 2017)
- Chief executive: Steve Whiteway
- Website: www.epsomcoaches.com

Epsom Coaches was an English bus and coach operator based in the town of Epsom, Surrey. Formed in 1920, it closed in June 2017 after a corporate restructure.

== History ==
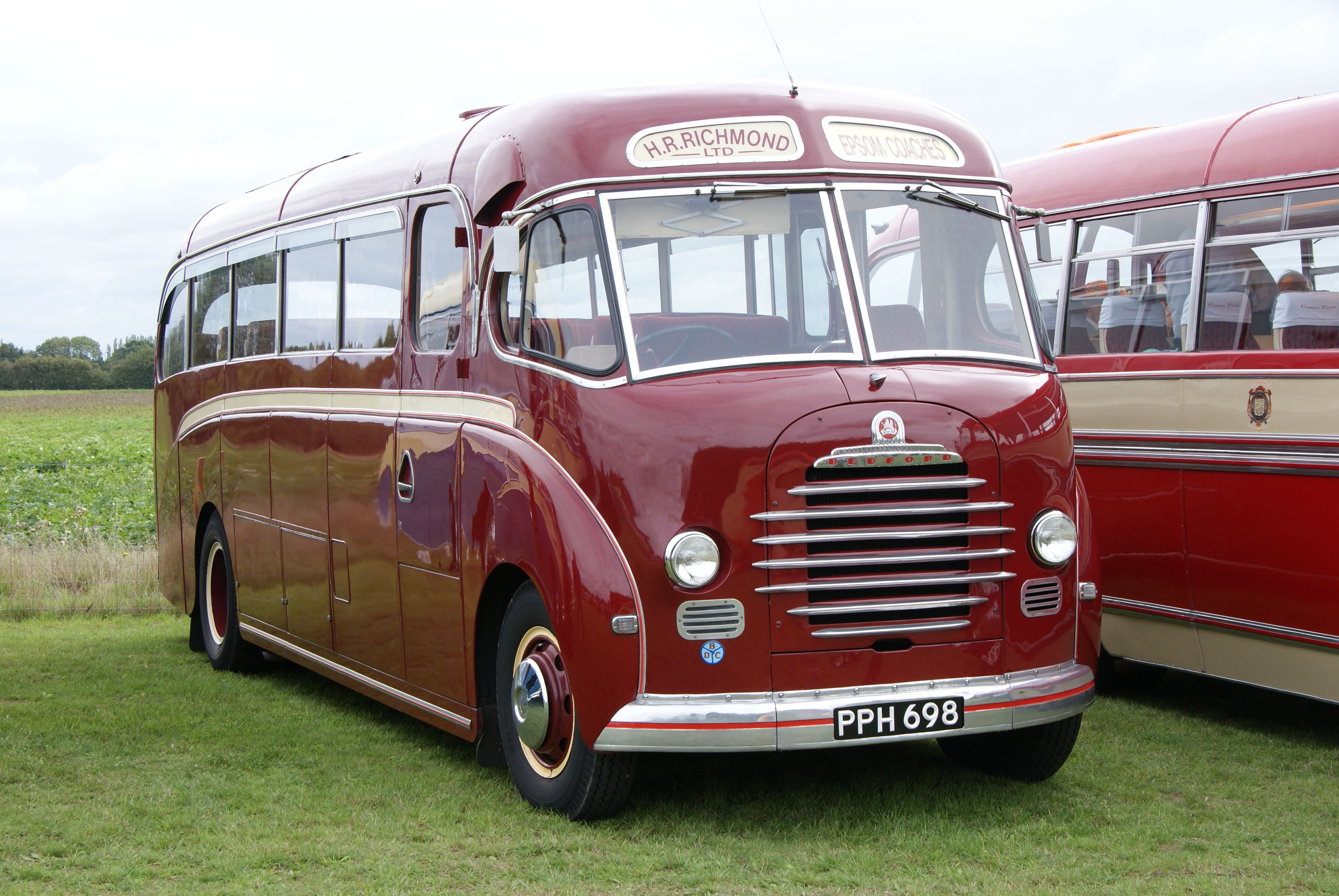
Duple Vista bodied Bedford SB

The coach business was established by Herbert Roderick Richmond in 1920 and latterly operated a fleet of mostly Setra coaches.

In 1986 Epsom Coaches entered the bus market after deregulation. In 2003, Epsom Coaches rebranded its bus division as Quality Line and repainted its vehicles from their traditional cream and brown into allover red to comply with Transport for London requirements.

It operated a staff shuttle service for the Epsom and St Helier University Hospitals NHS Trust, between Epsom, St Helier and Sutton Hospitals. These were in a plain silver livery. It also operated bus services in Surrey, both commercial and for the county council using the silver livery.

From March 2012 Epsom Coaches operated a London Victoria Coach Station to Wolverhampton service under contract to National Express.

On 19 April 2012 Epsom Coaches was purchased by the RATP Group. In June 2017 as part of a restructure of RATP's operations, Epsom Coaches ceased trading with the remaining operations continuing under the Quality Line brand.

== In popular culture ==
In 2014, Epsom Coaches appeared in rock band Twin Atlantic's 'Hold On' music video.
