= London Buses route 293 =

London bus route

293
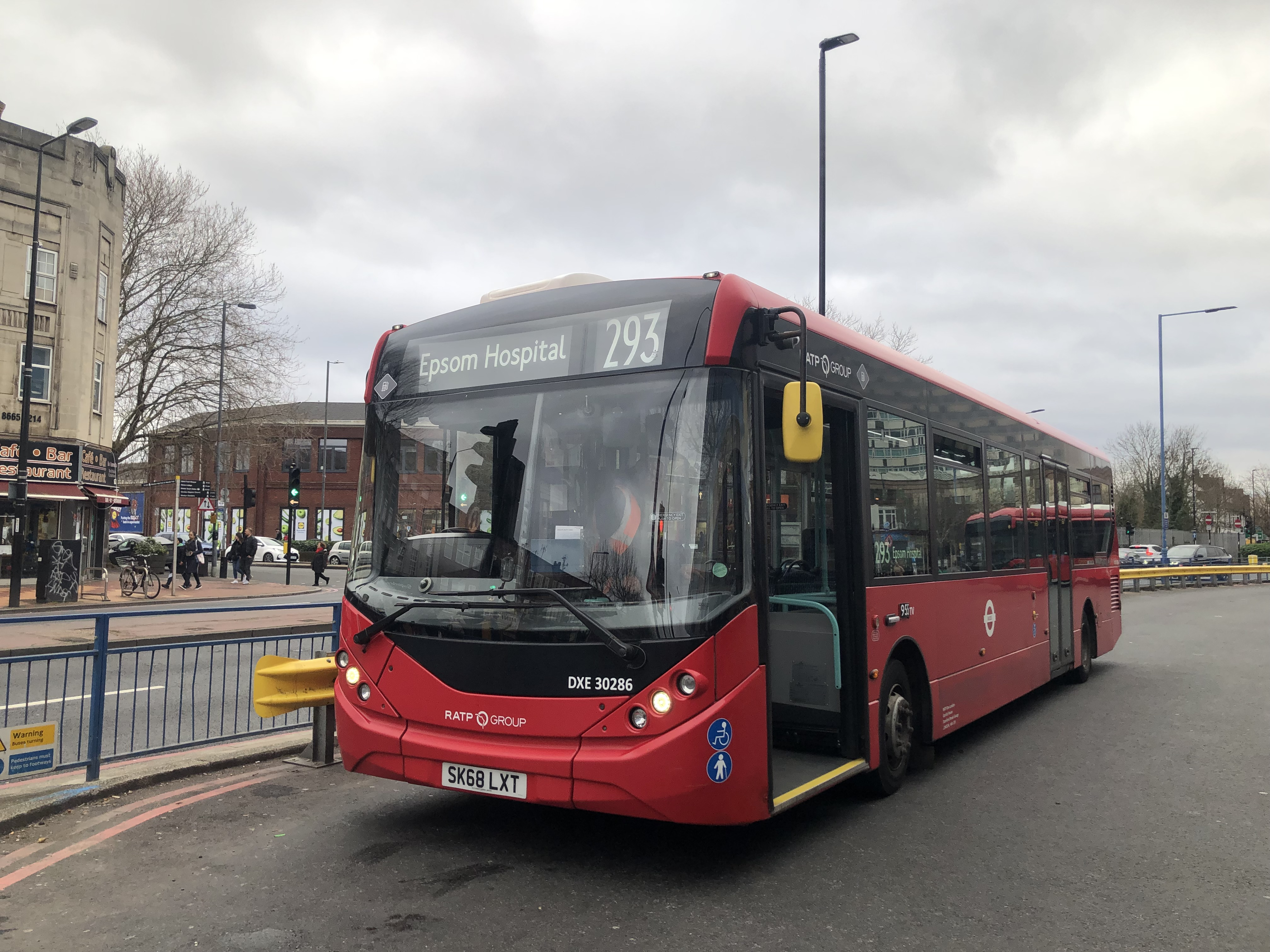
- London United Alexander Dennis Enviro200 MMC at Morden station in February 2024

Overview
- Operator: London United (First Bus London)
- Garage: Tolworth
- Vehicle: Alexander Dennis Enviro200 MMC
- Peak vehicle requirement: 6
- Began service: 18 April 1970
- Predecessors: Route 93
- Former operators: Quality Line; Metrobus; London General; London Country South West; London Country
- Night-time: No night service

Route
- Start: Morden station
- Via: Lower Morden; North Cheam; Stoneleigh; Ewell; Epsom
- End: Epsom Hospital
- Length: 9 miles (14 km)

Service
- Level: Daily

London Buses route 293 is a Transport for London contracted bus route in London and Surrey, England. Running between Morden station and Epsom Hospital, it is operated by First Bus London subsidiary London United.

== History ==
Route 293 commenced operating on 18 April 1970 between Wimbledon and Epsom stations, replacing route 93 between North Cheam and Epsom. The new route was allocated to Merton garage with operation by AEC Merlins. On 20 April 1974, it was converted to double operation with Daimler Fleetlines.

On 23 April 1983, route 293 was rerouted to serve Hackbridge instead of Wimbledon. Upon being put up for tender, the route passed to London Country on 19 July 1986, who introduced using second hand ex Strathclyde Partnership for Transport Leyland Atlanteans. Upon the privatisation of LCBS, the route was transferred to London Country South West.

In 1990, the route was withdrawn between Morden station and Hackbridge, and was extended to run to Merton Abbey. New Volvo Citybuses replaced the Atlanteans. The route passed from the control of London Regional Transport, and became a commercially operated route by London Country. From 1993-1995, evening and Sunday services were renumbered 593, and were operated by Epsom Buses using Mercedes-Benz minibuses.

Between 1995 and 1998, there were a number of route changes, but the route was finally standardised to run its current service in 2000, now operated by London General.

Upon being re-tendered, on 19 July 2003 route 293 passed to Quality Line. The service was slightly re-routed between Morden and North Cheam. When next tendered, the route passed to Metrobus' Croydon garage on 30 August 2008.

Metrobus successfully tendered to retain the route, with a new contract commencing on 31 August 2013.

On 1 September 2018, operation of the route was taken over by Quality Line. On 19 June 2021, operation of the route was transferred from Quality Line to fellow RATP Group company London United's Tolworth garage.

On 28 February 2025, the route passed from London United to First Bus London following the acquisition of RATP Dev Transit London by FirstGroup.

== Current route ==
Route 293 operates via these primary locations:

- Morden station
- Lower Morden
- North Cheam
- Stoneleigh
- Ewell
- Epsom station
- Epsom Hospital
