= Southdown Buses =

British bus operating company

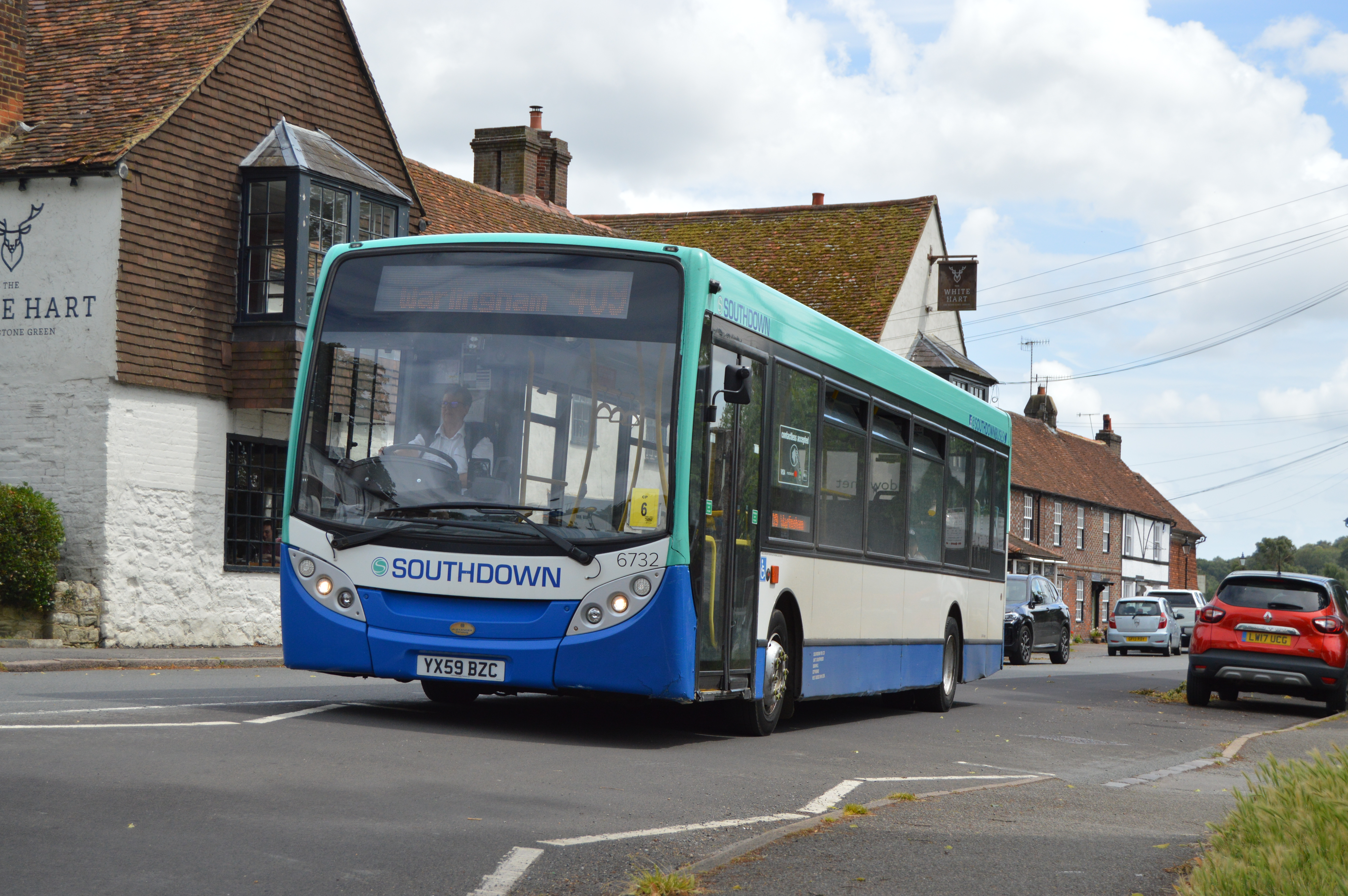
- Alexander Dennis Enviro200 Dart in Godstone in July 2023
- Founded: April 2002; 24 years ago
- Ceased operation: 2 September 2023; 3 years ago
- Headquarters: Copthorne
- Service area: West Sussex; East Surrey; Kent; South London
- Service type: Bus services
- Routes: 18 (9 of which were school routes)
- Hubs: Oxted, East Grinstead, Caterham & Westerham
- Fleet: 24 (June 2023)
- Chief executive: Stephen Wallis
- Website: www.southdown.net

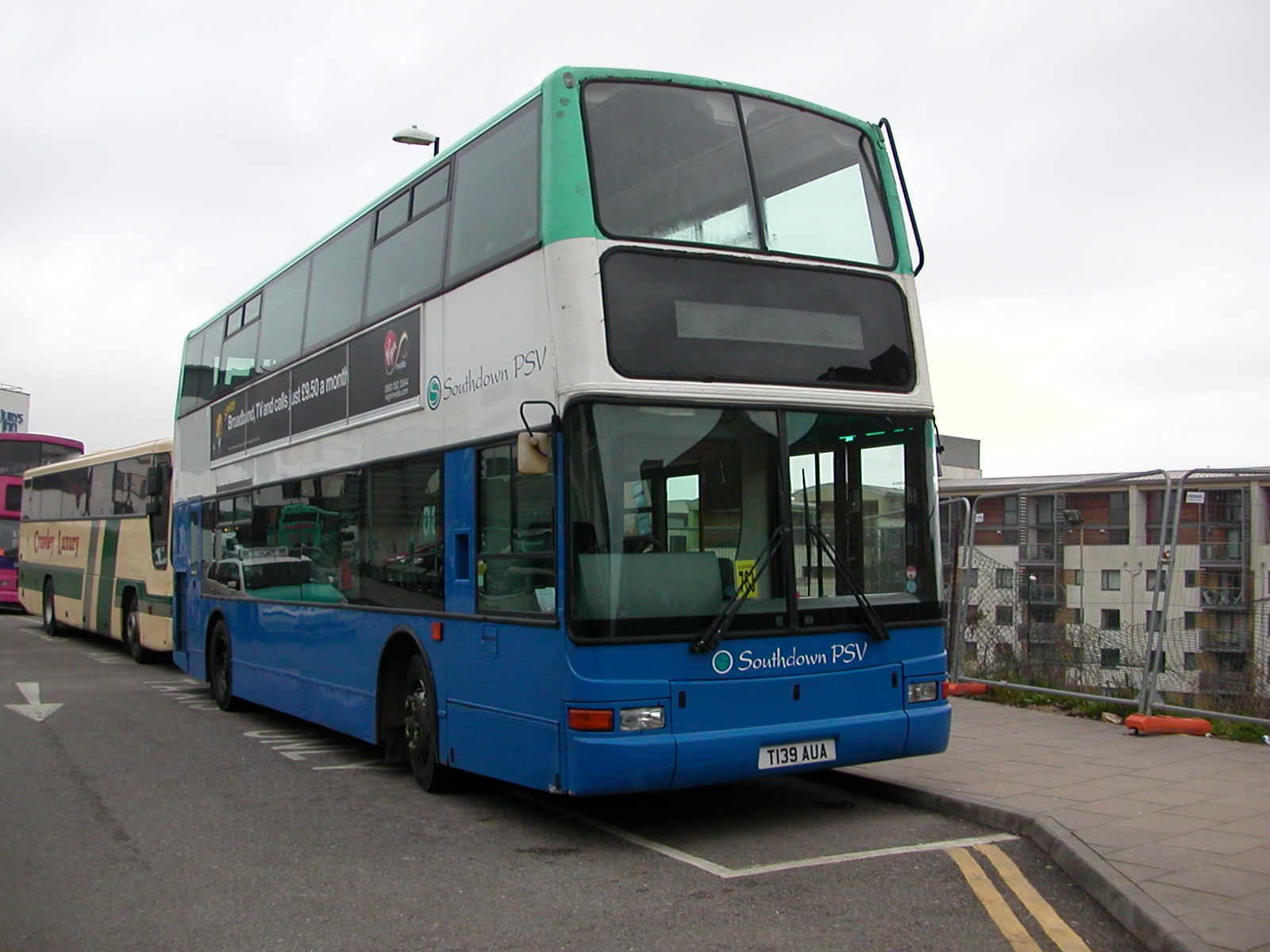
Plaxton President bodied DAF DB250 at Brighton station in 2008

Southdown PSV Limited, which traded as Southdown Buses, was a medium-sized country bus operator, with 18 routes across East Surrey, West Sussex, South London and Kent, 9 of which were school bus routes. Most of their routes were operated on behalf of Surrey County Council, other work included railway replacement services for planned engineering work.

Southdown Buses operated mainly in Oxted, Horley, Redhill, Westerham, Lingfield, Caterham, and East Grinstead. Their only operating garage was in Copthorne.

On 1 February 2023, Southdown Buses was purchased by the Go-Ahead Group, with the company being brought under the control of Brighton & Hove and the Southdown Buses identity initially being retained. Southdown Buses ceased operations on 2 September 2023, with services, staff and vehicles transferred to Metrobus.

== Fleet ==
As of June 2023, Southdown Buses operated a fleet of 24 buses. The fleet consisted of a mixture of Plaxton President bodied Volvo B7TL, Alexander Dennis Enviro200, Alexander Dennis Enviro200 MMC, Alexander Dennis Enviro400 bodied Scania N230UD Alexander Dennis Enviro400 MMC bodied Scania N250UD buses.

In 2018, Southdown Buses took delivery of two Alexander Dennis Enviro400 MMC buses based on the Scania N250UD chassis, having trialled a demonstrator the previous year. In 2021, Southdown took delivery of two Alexander Dennis Enviro200 MMC buses.

== Dealership ==
In addition to being a bus operator, Southdown Buses also used to be a new and used bus dealer. In September 2016, the business was split with Southdown Buses' managing director, Steve Swain taking over the dealership and renaming it Chartwell Bus & Coach Sales.
