= Fastway (bus rapid transit) =

Bus rapid transit scheme in Surrey and Sussex, England

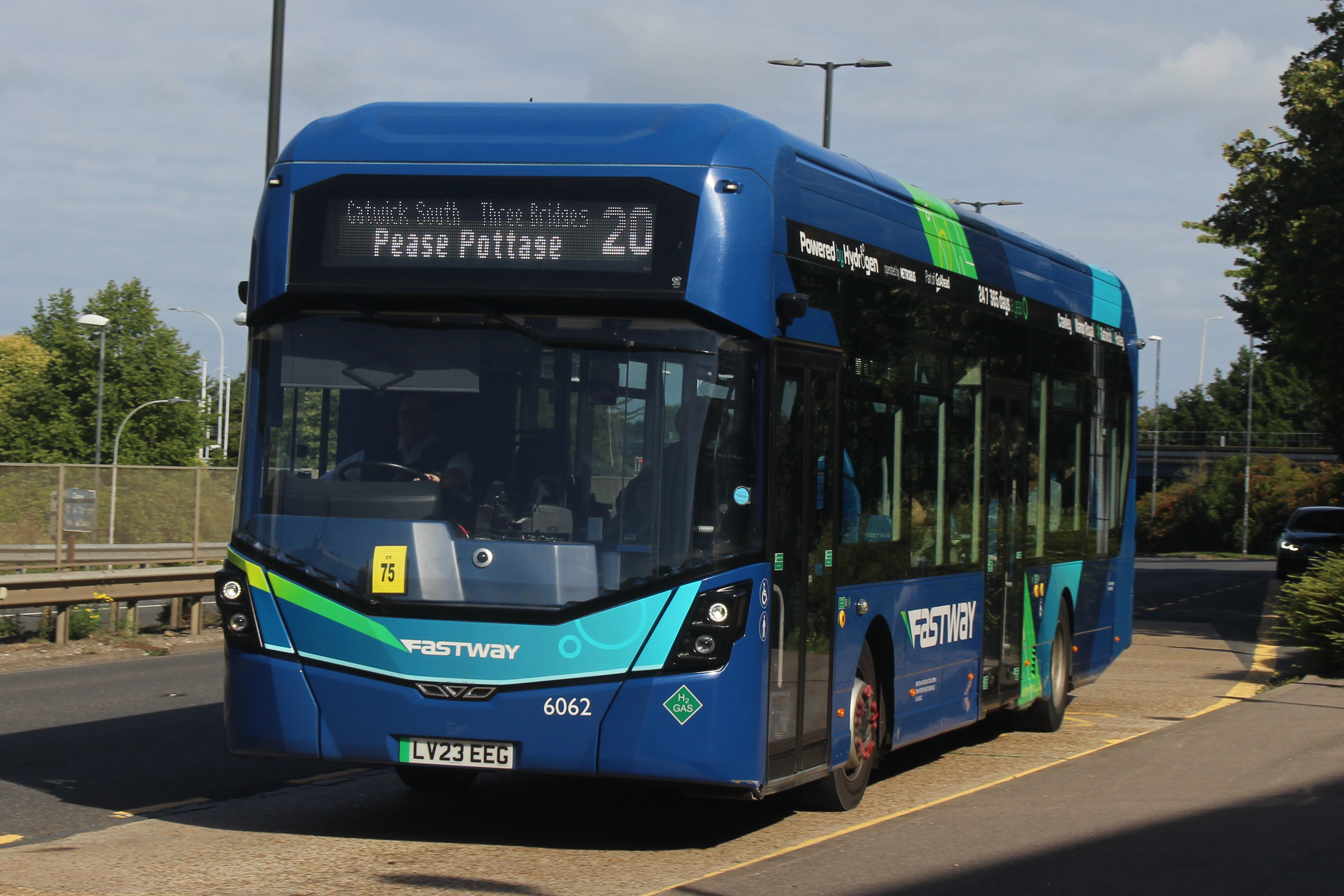
- A Fastway Wright GB Kite Hydroliner fuel cell bus at Gatwick Airport in August 2025

Overview
- Locale: Crawley
- Transit type: Bus rapid transit and Guided busway
- Number of lines: 3
- Number of stations: 150
- Website: www.fastway.info

Operation
- Began operation: October 2006
- Operator(s): Metrobus

Technical
- System length: 24 km (14.9 mi)

Fastway is a bus rapid transit network in Surrey and West Sussex, United Kingdom, linking Crawley with Gatwick Airport and Horley, the first to be constructed outside a major city. It uses specially adapted buses that can either be steered by the driver or operate as "self steering" guided buses along a specially constructed track. Fastway is operated by Metrobus, using Wright GB Kite Hydroliner fuel cell buses.

== Overview ==
Fastway aims to improve bus services in the Crawley, Gatwick and Horley area. The project included construction of new bus lanes, including guided bus lanes, construction of new bus waiting shelters and provision of electronic real-time passenger information and a fleet of new low-floor buses for Metrobus (part of the Go Ahead Group)

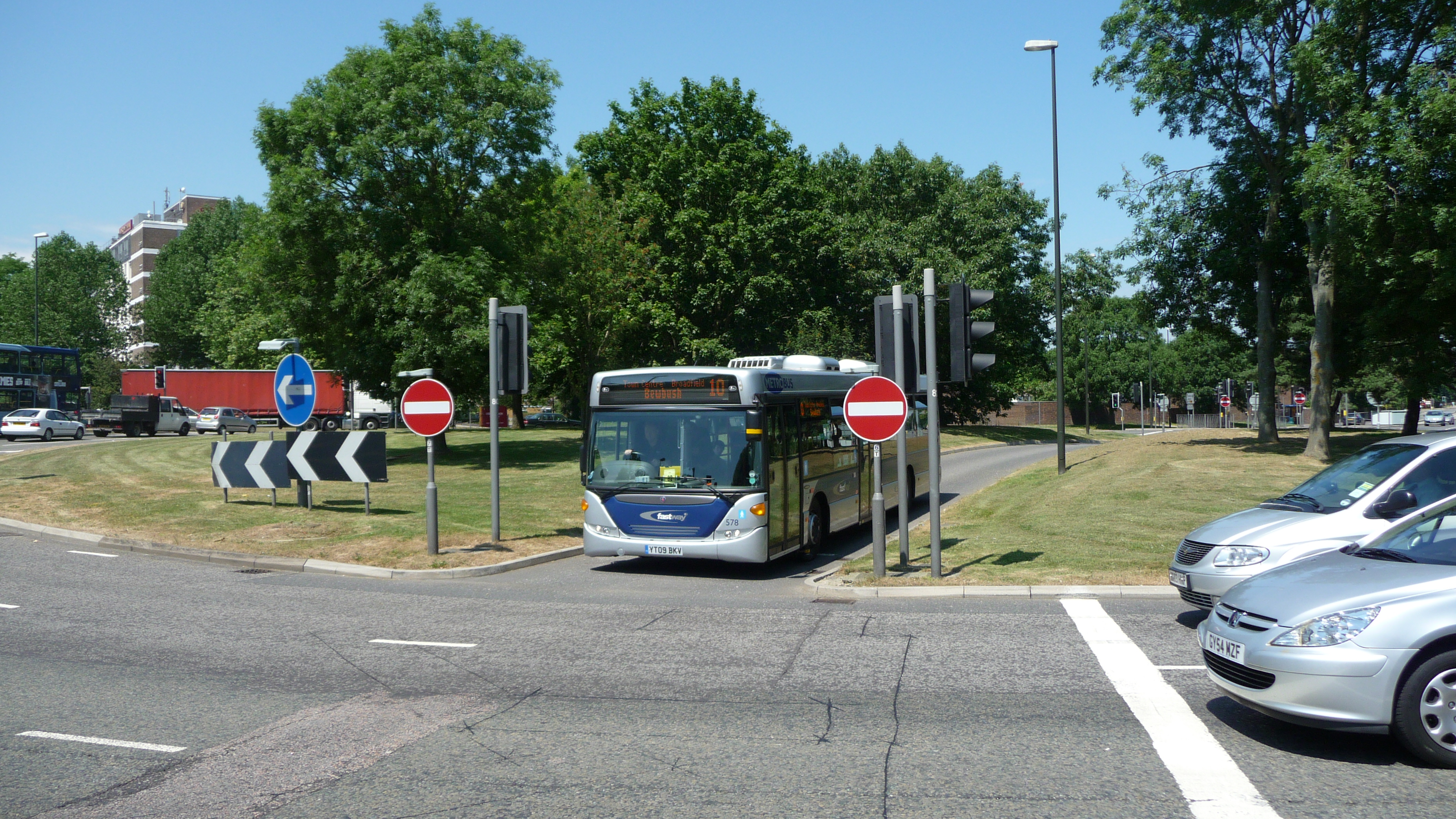
Bus priority includes this bus lane over the middle of Tushmore Roundabout in Crawley, allowing buses to by-pass other traffic.

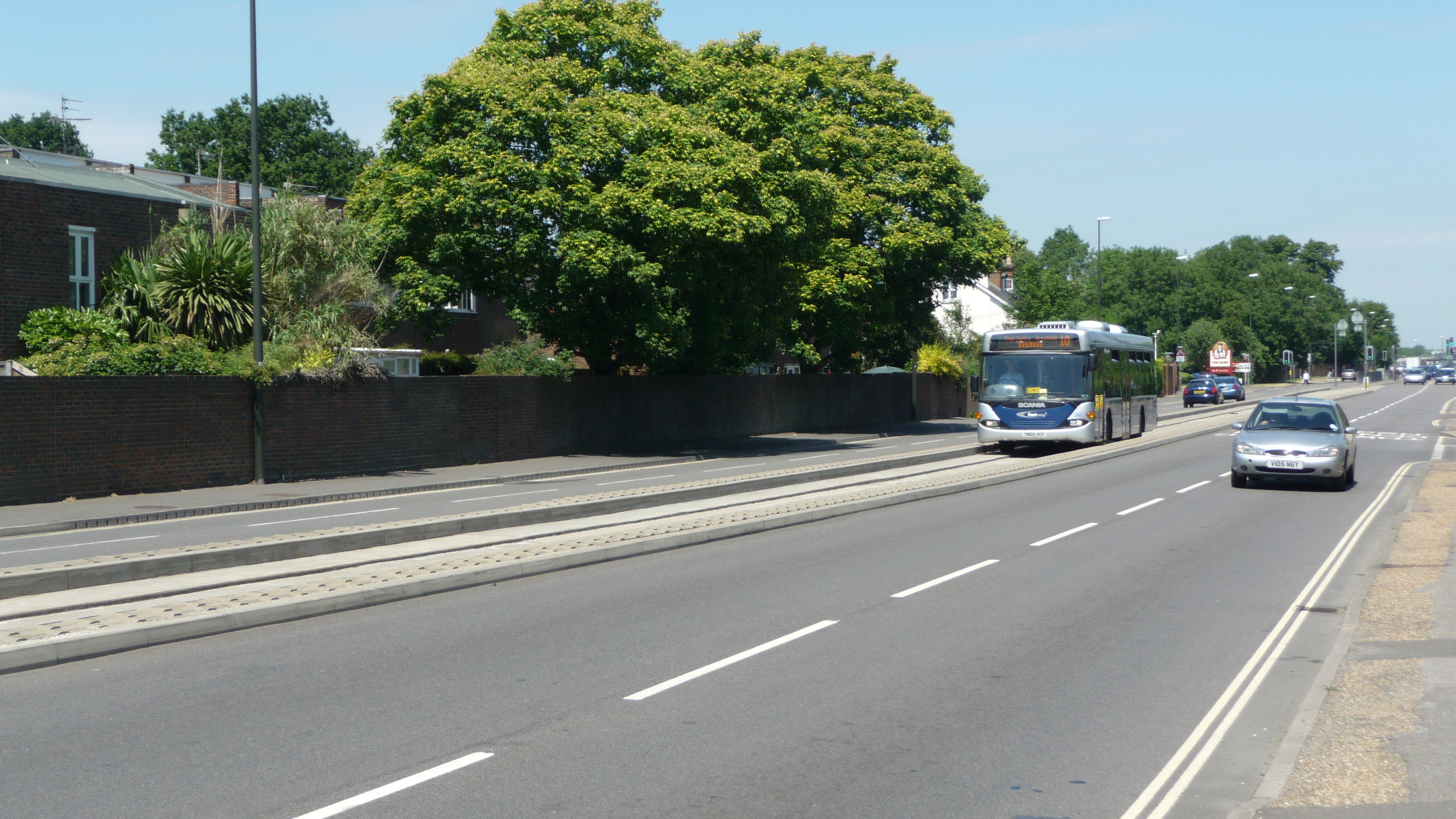
A stretch of guided Busway on the A23 London Road in Crawley. This leads up to the bus lane over the roundabout.

Construction work began in May 2002, and was scheduled to be completed by June 2005. In October 2006, major work stopped, having completed around 60% of the planned work - 1.5 km guided and 5.8 km unguided bus lanes were constructed, of the planned 2.5 km guided and 8.8 km unguided lanes. The planned 24 traffic lights and 11 roundabouts were changed to 40 traffic lights and 2 roundabouts.

== History ==
Phase 1 (Service 10) commenced in September 2003 between Bewbush and Gatwick, £50,000 over budget and four months behind schedule. The opening was attended by Tony McNulty MP, the Parliamentary Under-Secretary of State for Transport, and local dignitaries. The service was extended from 21- to 24-hour operation in May 2004 and now runs every 7 minutes during the day and every 20–30 minutes in the early morning, evening and Sunday.

In July 2005 the project was more than £6 million over budget. An independent inquiry was launched to investigate the losses, led by a task force from East Sussex County Council. The results of the inquiry were published in December 2005. ESCC concluded West Sussex had shown a pattern of "ineffective accountability, complacency, ineffective risk management and a lack of clear ownership of the financial management responsibilities".

On 27 August 2005 Fastway service 20 was introduced, running between Broadfield, Three Bridges, Manor Royal, Gatwick Airport, Horley and Langshott. On Mondays to Saturdays it runs approximately every 20–30 minutes during the day, and every 30 minutes in the early morning, late evening and all-day Sunday. Service 20 runs now 24-hours.

== Decision making process ==
Bus rapid transit was chosen to minimise start-up costs, and remove the need for public consultation exercises. Fastway is the first bus rapid transit system in the world to be built outside a major city by a partnership of local authorities and private companies with automatic vehicle location, pre-trip and in-trip passenger information and automatic traffic signal priority from the start.

== Funding ==
In June 2002 the official Fastway website was updated to show a cost of £27 million, with just under £10 million provided by the government.

In September 2003, the Go-Ahead group withdrew their £3 million commitment to the project. The government increased its contribution to cover this as well as other rising costs, raising its contribution to £16.642 million.

By July 2005, West Sussex County Council's share of the project's cost had increased five-fold from £6.2 million to almost £30 million, resulting in external audit and probe into the programme. The inquiry found no wrongdoing by a single employee of the council when it concluded in December 2005, however did state that the council had "ineffective accountability, complacency, ineffective risk management and a lack of clear ownership of the financial management responsibilities".

== Services ==
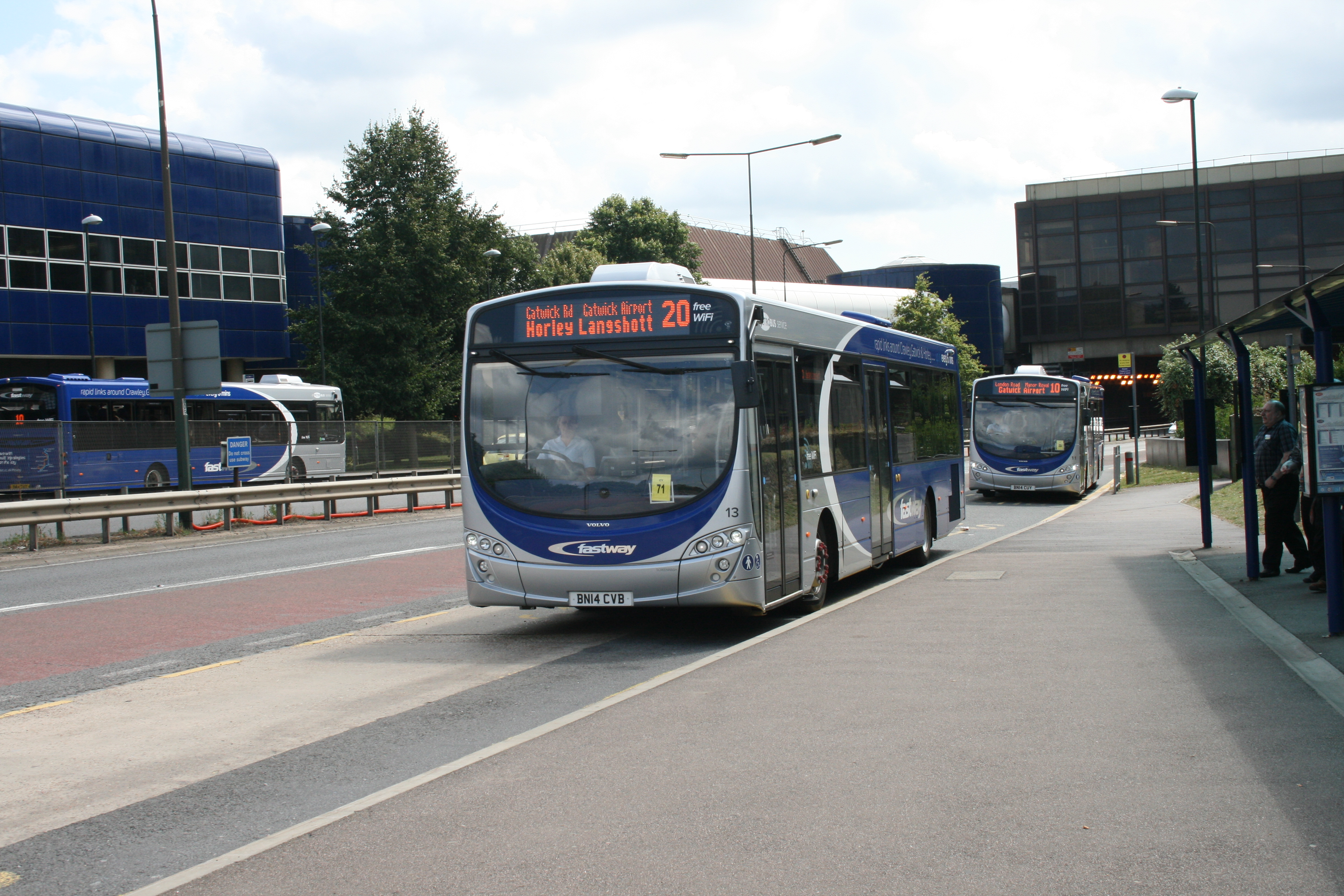
Three Fastway Volvo B7RLE Wright Eclipse 2 buses at Gatwick Airport on routes 10 and 20.

The Fastway system is currently formed of three bus routes, all of which are operated by Metrobus:

=== Route 10 ===
Route 10 is the most frequent service on the network. It operates between Kilnwood Vale and Gatwick Airport via Bewbush, Broadfield, Crawley Town Centre and Manor Royal. It runs every 7–8 minutes during daytime on weekdays and Saturdays, every 10 minutes on Sundays and every 30 minutes overnight.

=== Route 20 ===
Route 20 operates between Pease Pottage and Langshott via Broadfield, Crawley Town Centre, Three Bridges, Gatwick Airport and Horley. It runs every 20 minutes during daytime on weekdays and Saturdays, every 30 minutes on Sundays and approximately every 45 minutes overnight.

=== Route 100 ===
Route 100 is the longest route on the network. It operates between Maidenbower and Redhill via Three Bridges, Crawley Town Centre, Manor Royal, Gatwick Airport, Horley and East Surrey Hospital. It runs every 15 minutes on weekdays and Saturdays, every 30 minutes on Sundays and hourly overnight.

== Promoters ==
The Fastway project was promoted and funded by a public-private partnership. The consortium included West Sussex County Council, Surrey County Council, Crawley Borough Council, Reigate and Banstead Borough Council, BAA Gatwick, British Airways. There is also support from the UK Department for Transport.

The project initially included a £3 million contribution by Metrobus, the bus operator, and its parent company, the Go-Ahead Group, but this was withdrawn after construction had started, and the money was replaced by West Sussex County Council.

The projected cost started at £27 million and was later revised to £32 million, then £35 million, with between £7.5 and £10 million from West Sussex County Council. The final cost of the scheme is still unknown, but has risen from the original estimates and was described as £6 million over budget

Metrobus has stated that passenger figures are up 10 percent, with 35 percent of journeys being to and from Gatwick. One million passengers were carried in the first seven months of operation.

== Opposition ==
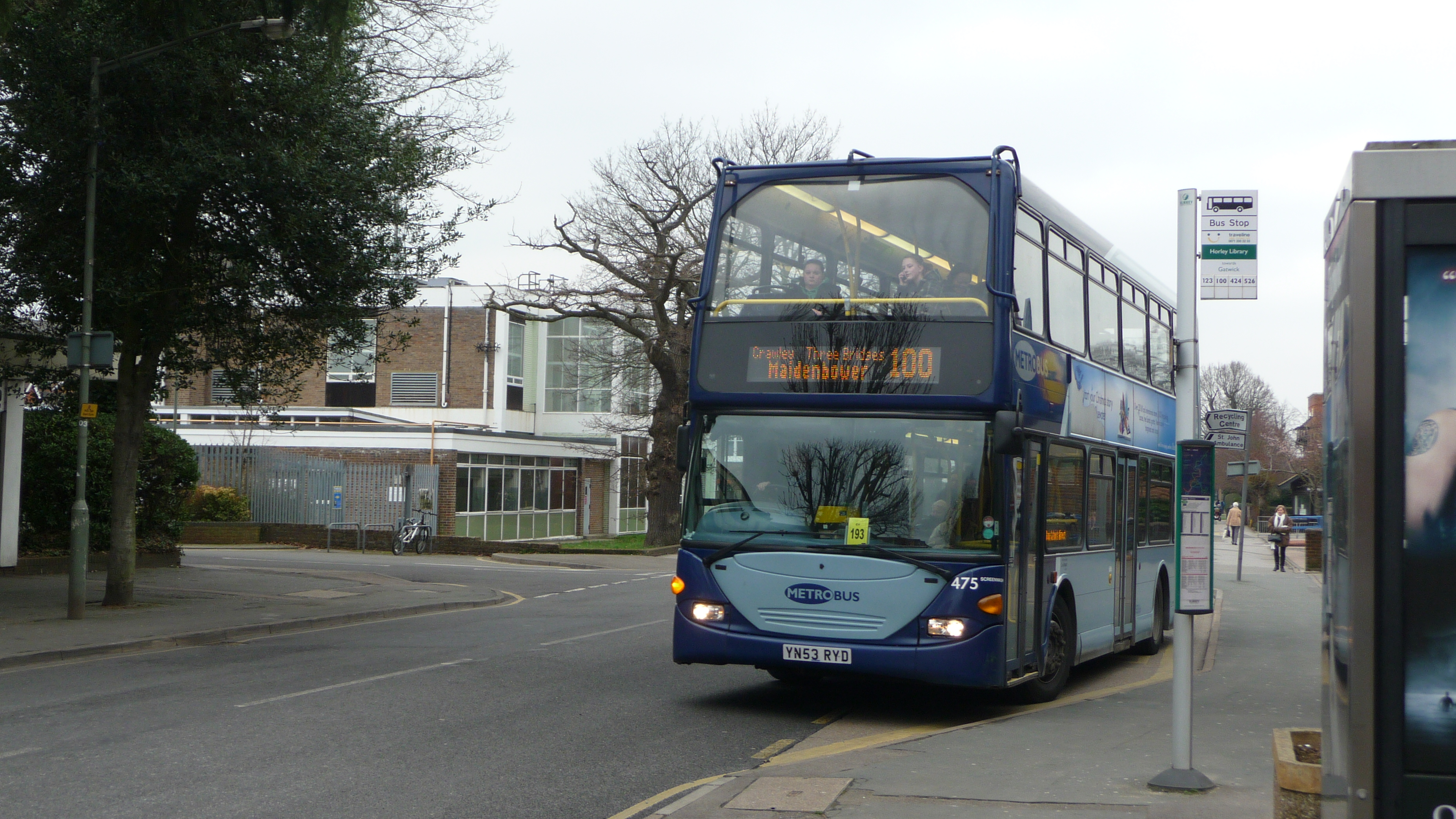
Sometimes, when not enough Fastway vehicles are available, standard buses have to substitute. Seen here is a double-decker operating route 100 outside Horley Library.

It has been noted that, while successful at reducing road traffic, Fastway has not tackled gaps in the existing public transport network, particularly Pound Hill.

== Accidents ==
On 31 October 2005 a Fastway bus travelling along Breezehurst Drive crashed into a terraced house. Two elderly residents were evacuated, and the damage required the house to be demolished. Four passengers suffered minor injuries. Another accident was reported in the same place in 2008.

== Passenger numbers ==
A survey in 2006 showed average passenger numbers during the 7-9am peak were 5, one for each bus By 2008 as the system became established the West Sussex County Council indicated that bus use in Crawley had increased by 25% following quality improvements.

== See also ==
- List of guided busways and BRT systems in the United Kingdom
- List of bus operators of the United Kingdom
- Fastrack - similar sized but unguided scheme in north-west Kent
