= Metrobus (South East England) =

Bus operator in South-East England

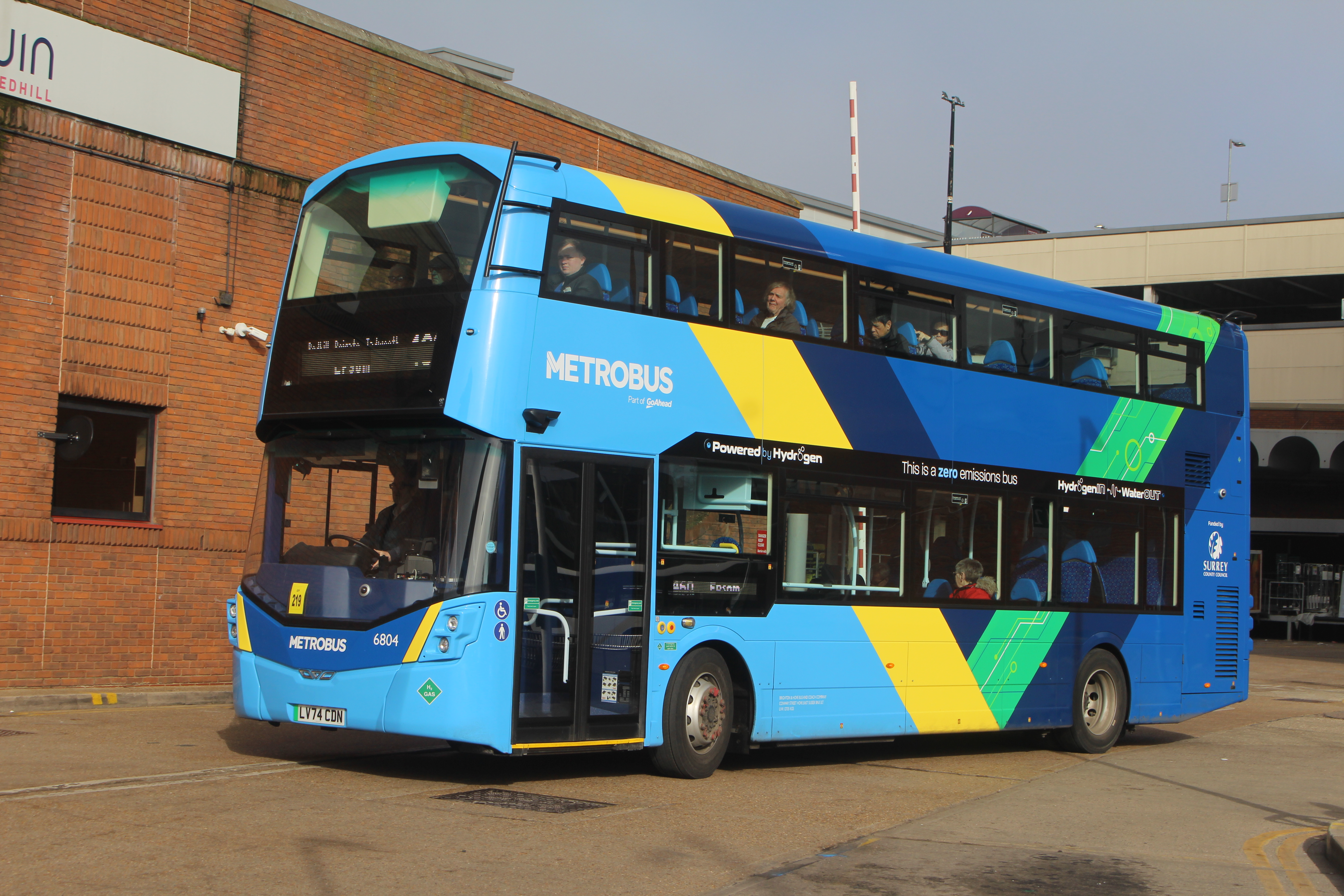
- Wright StreetDeck Hydroliner fuel cell bus in Redhill in March 2025
- Parent: Brighton & Hove
- Founded: July 1983; 43 years ago
- Headquarters: Crawley
- Service area: East Sussex; Kent; Surrey; West Sussex
- Service type: Bus services
- Routes: 70
- Hubs: Crawley; Copthorne
- Fleet: 287 (February 2026), 231 currently operating
- Website: www.metrobus.co.uk

Metrobus is a bus operator running services in parts of Surrey, Kent, Sussex, and Greater London. Formed through a management buyout in 1983, Metrobus was purchased by the Go-Ahead Group in September 1999 and, following a reorganisation of the company in July 2014, the Metrobus brand became a trade name of Brighton & Hove while the legal Metrobus company became a subsidiary of Go-Ahead London.

Prior to the reorganisation of the company, Metrobus also operated many routes under contract to Transport for London in south and south-east London. These were brought under the control of Go-Ahead London under its new Metrobus subsidiary on 1 April 2014.

== History ==
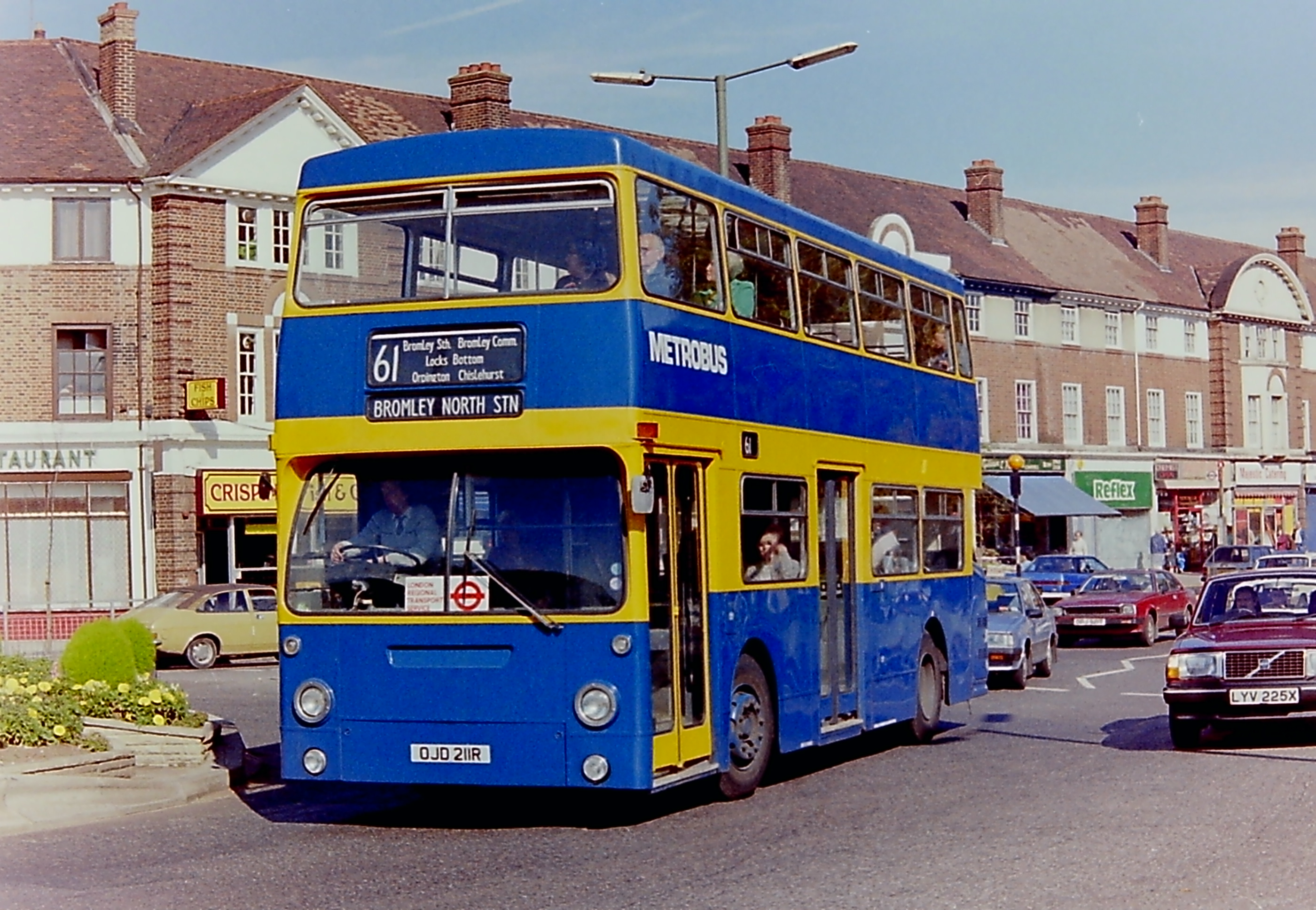
Leyland Fleetline in Metrobus' original blue and yellow livery operating route 61 on Orpington high street in September 1986

In February 1981, the Orpington & District bus company collapsed due to financial difficulties, and the Tillingbourne Bus Company, based in West Surrey, set up Tillingbourne (Metropolitan) Limited to replace their operations. In July 1983, Metrobus Limited was formed when two directors, Gary Wood and Peter Larking, purchased the Tillingbourne subsidiary.

The newly formed company acquired the former Orpington & District garage at Green Street Green, Orpington, along with six employees and six vehicles. Three routes were operated by Metrobus at the time it was set up: 353, running from Croydon to Orpington via Coombe Road, 355, running from Croydon to Forestdale and 357, running from Croydon to Orpington via Forestdale.

In May 1982, a 'shopper bus' service was introduced, running from Sanderstead to Bromley town centre via New Addington. In keeping with the route numbers of the former Tillingbourne services, this route was numbered 354. Due to requests from residents, the route also began to serve Bourne Vale and the Hayesford Park Estate, which were some distance from other bus services. In October 1983, the 354 was rerouted to cut out New Addington, and diverted at Addington to run to Croydon instead of Sanderstead.

In 1986, competitive tendering for London Regional Transport bus service contracts was introduced, with Metrobus expanding operations through winning tenders to operate route 61, running between Bromley North railway station and Chislehurst or Eltham, and route 361, running between Bromley North railway station and Green Street Green. Route 355 was discontinued for short journeys between Croydon and Forestdale, and the 354 frequency increased and rerouted via Selsdon Vale, although the residents of the area refused to allow London Regional Transport to put fixed bus stops in place. The route was also curtailed at Selsdon, although it was extended back to East Croydon the next year. By the summer of 1988, route 354 was offering an hourly service on Mondays to Saturdays between Croydon, Selsdon, Addington, Hayes and Bromley. In 1995, route 357 was withdrawn after routes 353 and 354 were re-timetabled.

Two coach operators, Southlands Travel of Bromley and RB Coaches, were taken over by Metrobus in October 1991, along with the ten vehicles originally owned by the companies. These coaches were used on the already existing private hire business, and to operate scheduled day trips to European destinations. Earlier that year, Metrobus entered into a partnership with the London Docklands Development Corporation to investigate the feasibility of commuter coach services to the Isle of Dogs, however no such services resulted.

In the summers of 1994 and 1995, Metrobus operated their 'Wealdsman' service, numbered 746, to complement the Surrey Hills weekend leisure bus network. Metrobus used a specially painted blue and yellow AEC Regal IV (RF-class) vehicle for the long service between Bromley and Tunbridge Wells, connecting with other leisure services at Westerham.

From 1996, Metrobus introduced other commercial routes operated under Section 3(2) of the London Regional Transport Act 1984 (later to become London Local Service Agreements), including the 351, 356 and 358; all such routes were later transferred to Transport for London in mid-2002. In 1997, Metrobus expanded further into eastern Surrey with the purchase of East Surrey Bus Services, adding 23 vehicles to its fleet, and purchased 30% of shares in Newhaven, East Sussex independent Leisurelink. When Leisurelink ceased trading shortly after the share purchase, Metrobus took over Leisurelink's operations and opened a new depot in Lewes for a new subsidiary, named Metrobus South Coast, to operate the services.

=== Go-Ahead Group ownership ===
Metrobus logo used under Go-Ahead ownership until 2025

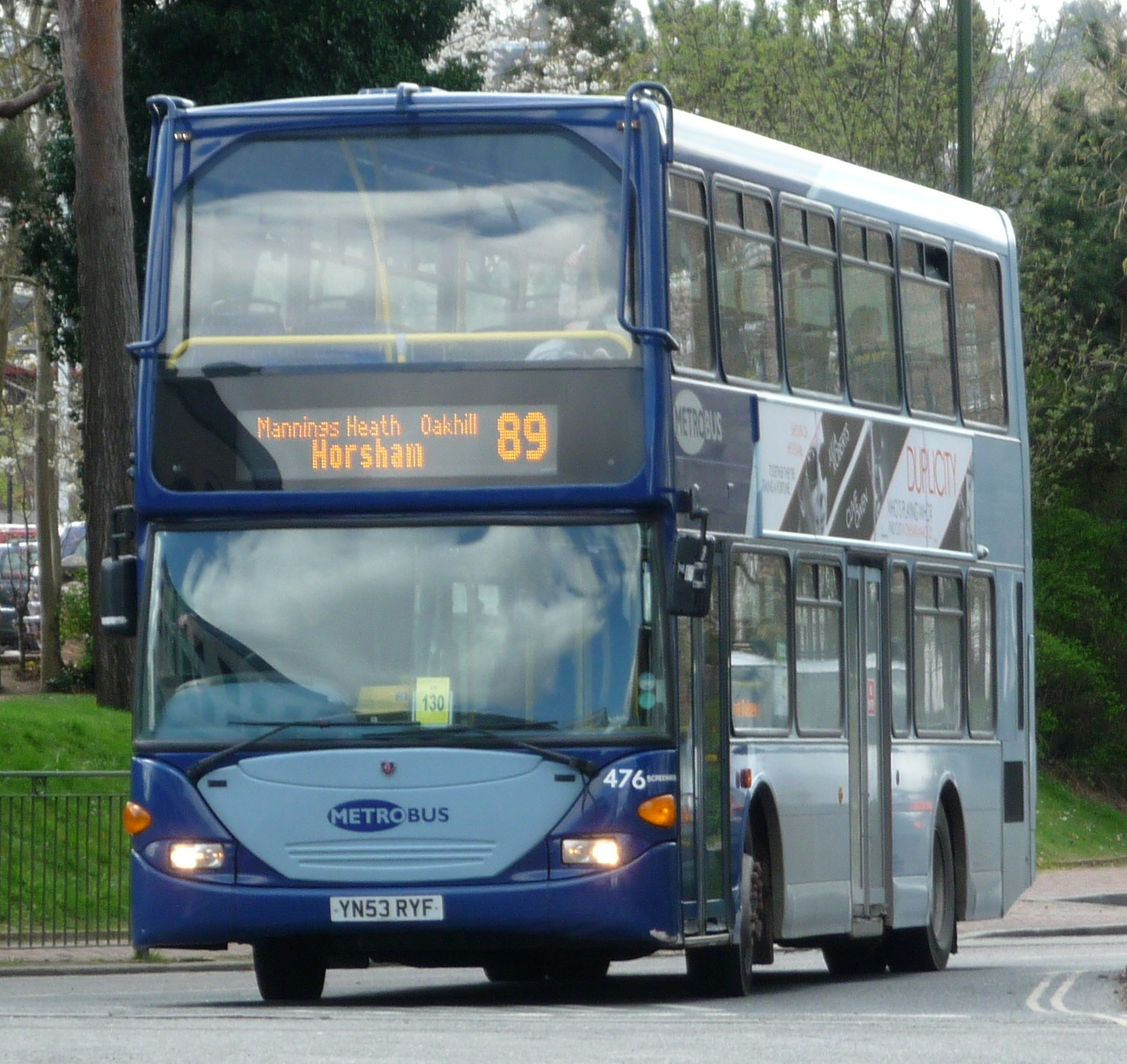
East Lancs OmniDekka bodied Scania N94UD in Horsham in April 2009

In September 1999, Metrobus was purchased by the Go-Ahead Group.

Routes 353 and 354 were altered due to the opening of Croydon Tramlink on 20 May 2000. Both routes were transferred to standard TfL contract; the 353 was withdrawn between Addington Village and Croydon, and the 354, renumbered T33 to reflect its new status as a Tramlink 'feeder' route, was withdrawn between Addington and Bromley.

Following the decision by Arriva Southern Counties to discontinue its operations in Crawley and most of East Surrey and West Sussex in February 2001, Metrobus purchased Arriva's premises in Crawley and took over existing operations at the depot. The company headquarters, as well as the operation of all non-London routes, was moved from Orpington to Crawley, with Metrobus subsequently beginning to develop a commercial bus network in the town.

In September 2002, West Sussex County Council awarded Metrobus the contract to operate the new Fastway bus rapid transit network, connecting Crawley with Gatwick Airport via a series of guided busways. The network opened in September 2003 and was designed to reduce congestion on the roads around Crawley by encouraging people to take the bus instead of using their cars.

Metrobus' South Coast bus operations ceased in July 2003 with the closure of its Lewes depot, with services transferring to fellow Go-Ahead subsidiary Brighton & Hove. The company expanded in Kent two years later with the acquisition of Tellings-Golden Miller's Dartford operations in February 2005. Also in 2005, Southlands Travel was sold to Sullivan Buses, along with Polhill Garage; the business was later resold to its management.

As a result of First London losing tendered bus service contracts at the garage, in December 2007, Metrobus took over the operations of First's Orpington garage, which had been established by First's predecessor CentreWest in 1995. All of Orpington's routes, staff and 35 vehicles were included, although the garage itself was closed, with the 'R' prefix routes transferring to Metrobus' own Orpington garage and route T32 being transferred to Croydon.

In September 2009, it was announced that from 3 October 2009, Metrobus would take over Arriva Guildford & West Surrey's Horsham operations, including Horsham town routes, route 93, running between Dorking and Horsham, and London Buses route 465, running between Dorking and Kingston. Metrobus purchased 19 buses as part of the sale and moved operations away from Arriva's site at Warnham to their existing depot in Crawley.

==== Company split ====
In March 2013, Go-Ahead announced it was to restructure Metrobus, splitting the operations of its Transport for London contracted services to Go-Ahead London under a new Metrobus subsidiary and making the remaining elements of Metrobus a subsidiary company of Brighton & Hove. The splitting of Metrobus' London operations took place on 1 April 2014, with management of the remainder of Metrobus moving to Brighton & Hove on 1 July 2014.

In February 2023, Brighton & Hove acquired Copthorne independent Southdown Buses. Brighton & Hove initially maintained Southdown as an independent subsidiary operating alongside Metrobus, however on 2 September 2023, the operations of Southdown Buses were transferred to Metrobus.

== Fleet ==
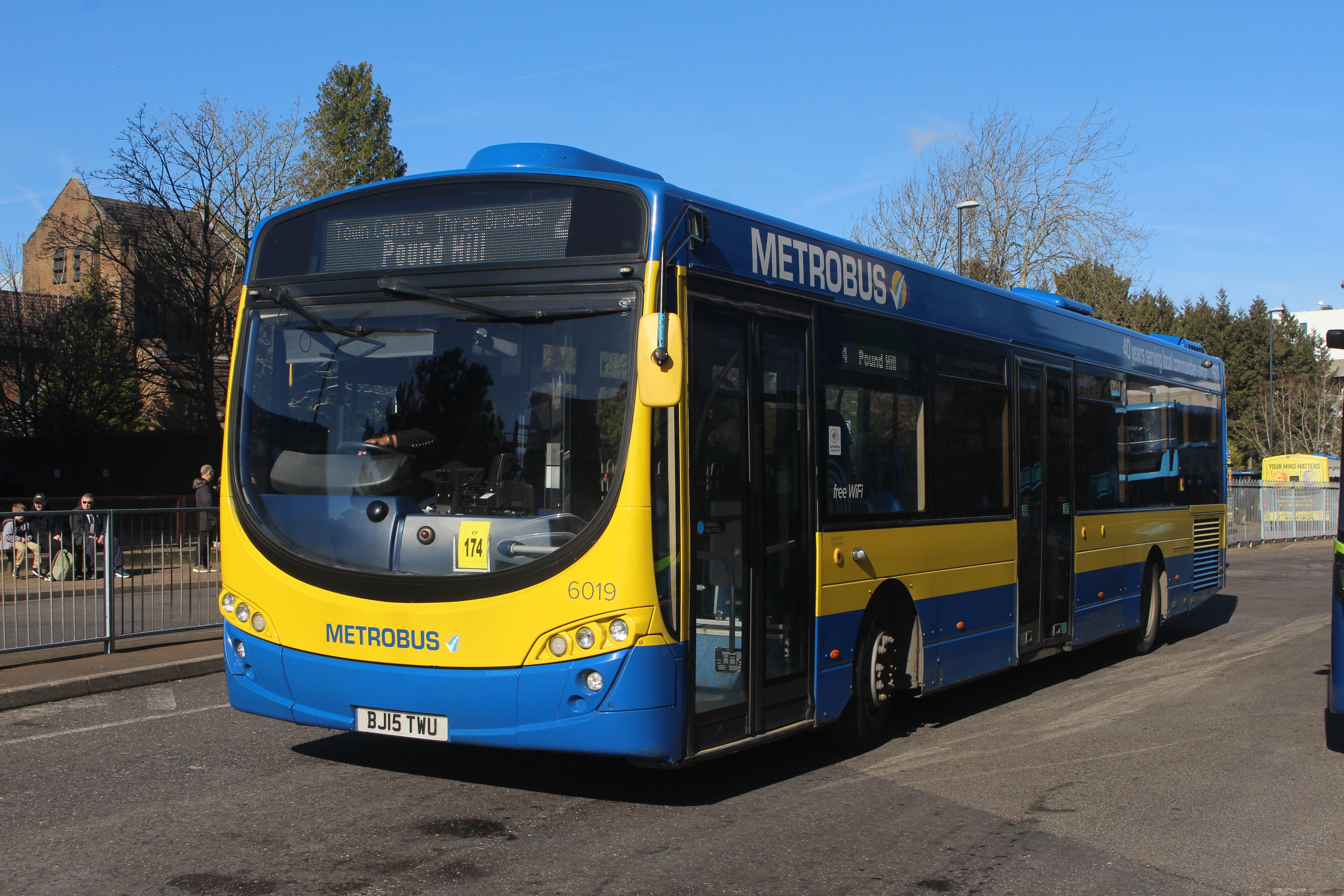
Wright Eclipse Urban 2 bodied Volvo B8RLE in Metrobus 40th anniversary heritage livery at Crawley bus station in March 2025

As of February 2026, the Metrobus fleet consists of 287 buses.

=== Incidents ===
In March 2003, two Metrobus vehicles were involved in a fatal accident at Crawley bus station. A bus crashed into the back of another bus and mounted the kerb where passengers were waiting. As a result of the impact, one woman was killed and five others injured. Metrobus described themselves as "devastated" by the accident, and said it was their "first major incident".

On 8 January 2011, one of Metrobus' vehicles was hijacked while in service in Merstham. The bus was empty having just dropped off the last passengers, and the bus driver managed to escape unharmed, along with the cash box the hijackers had tried to steal. The hijacked bus was then driven through the area, striking a number of parked cars and signs, before being reversed into another Metrobus vehicle which was in service with passengers. There were no injuries, but the road was closed for a number of hours while the police investigated. Two men, aged 23 and 25, were arrested. One was released on bail and the other was charged with seven separate offences.

On 13 August 2022, a Metrobus single-deck Scania OmniCity caught fire after a collision on the A24 in Ashington just north of Worthing while on route 23. Two people were taken to hospital and the vehicle was scrapped shortly after.

In December 2025, after one of their Wright GB Kite Hydroliner fuel cell buses caught fire in Crawley, 42 similar buses were withdrawn by Metrobus. The operator stated that Wrightbus asked them to take the buses off of the road as "a precautionary measure" and there would be "a disruption to services". Metrobus also stated that they sourced replacement buses to enter service.

== Garages ==
Metrobus operates 2 bus garages.

=== Crawley (CY) ===
Crawley garage operates routes 1, 2, 3, 4, 5, 10, 20, 21, 22, 23, 23X, 32, 51, 61, 65, 71, 84, 93, 98, 100, 200, 233, 270, 271, 272, 273, 281, 291, 398, 400, 420, 430, 435, 460, 480, 500, 603, 610, 617, 619, 624, 638, 643, 648, 690, 692, 693, 820, E9 and E10.

==== History ====
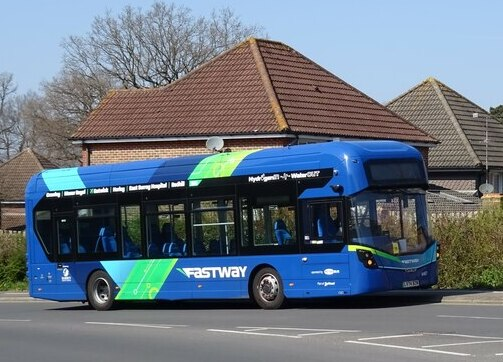
A Fastway Wright GB Kite Hydroliner fuel cell bus in Crawley in April 2025

Crawley depot was acquired by Metrobus in February 2001 after previous operator Arriva Southern Counties announced they were pulling out of Crawley and the wider East Surrey and West Sussex regions, soon becoming the headquarters of the company and the base for all non-Transport for London bus routes. In October 2009, Arriva sold their Horsham bus operations to Metrobus, with services originally operated from a depot in Warnham, including route 93 to Dorking and London Buses route 465 moving to Crawley.

During August 2013, new Wright Eclipse Urbans on Volvo B8RLE chassis were ordered as a replacement for the ageing Scania OmniCitys employed on the Fastway. Ten Alexander Dennis Enviro200s were ordered to both modernise the Metrobus fleet and to comply with new low-floor bus legislation by the start of 2016, entering service in March 2015. In January 2017, 17 new Wright StreetLites entered service with Metrobus, followed by an additional ten StreetLite Micro Hybrids entering service in May 2019.

Metrobus took delivery of Wright GB Kite Hydroliner fuel cell buses for use on the Fastway network in early 2023, with the official launch of the buses taking place on 29 June. To facilitate their delivery, Crawley depot was equipped with a hydrogen refuelling station that is capable of refuelling up to 100 buses. The stations store up to five tonnes of liquid hydrogen each in individual storage tanks and are capable of dispensing up to 250 kilograms (550 lb) of vapourised fuel per hour, meaning a hydrogen bus at Crawley depot can be refuelled in around eight minutes. A further 34 hydrogen buses have been ordered for delivery to Crawley depot.

=== Copthorne (CP) ===
Copthorne garage operates routes 84, 231, 233, 236, 280, 284, 318, 324, 409, 410, 410A, 411, 424, 485, 594, 595, 609, 611, 612, 646, 657, 658, 695 and 866.

==== History ====
This garage was originally operated by Southdown Buses until 2 September 2023, when it was taken over by Metrobus. The buses' fleetcodes were renumbered into the Metrobus fleetcode sequence on 12 March 2023, following Southdown Buses' purchase by Brighton & Hove on 1 February 2023.

== Former garages ==
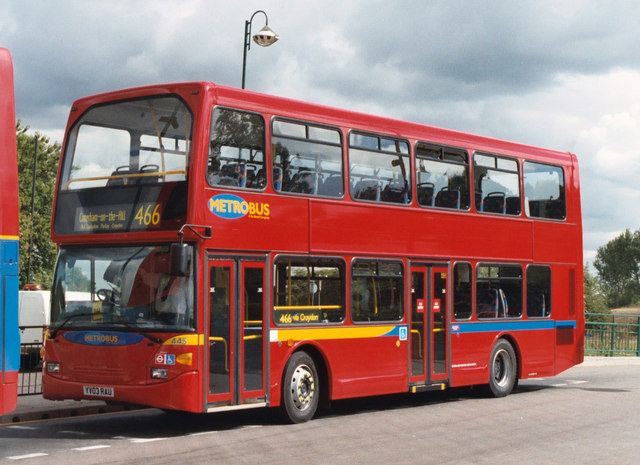
Scania OmniDekka in corporate London bus livery on route 466 in Addington in September 2003

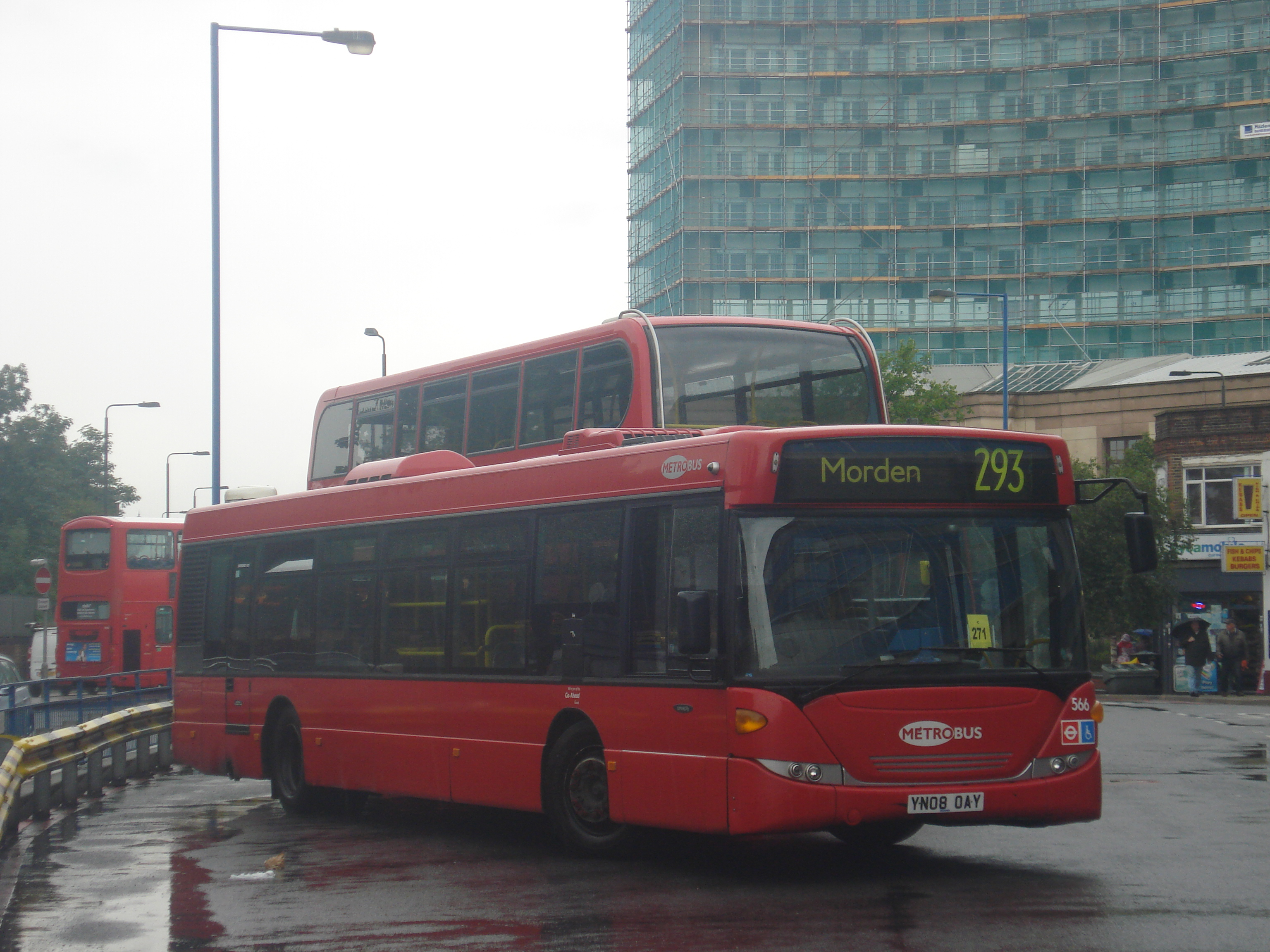
Scania OmniCity in Transport for London red livery on route 293 at Morden tube station in August 2013

Metrobus operated two depots that operated Transport for London contracted services. On 1 April 2014 in a reorganisation of the business, these were brought under the control of Go-Ahead London under its new Metrobus subsidiary.

=== Croydon (C) ===
Croydon garage operated routes 119, 127, 202, 293, 359, 405, 434 and 455.

==== History ====
The Beddington Lane depot was opened by Metrobus in December 2005 to house route 127, which had been surrendered early by Centra. Work was completed on the garage buildings in February 2006. This garage took over the London routes that ran from Godstone with the exception of the 146 and 246, both of which moved to Orpington.

=== Orpington (MB) ===
Orpington garage operated routes 119, 126, 138, 146, 161, 162, 181, 233, 284, 320, 336, 352, 353, 358, 464, 654, B14, R1, R2, R3, R4, R6, R8, R9 and R11.

==== History ====
A former farm, Orpington depot was for many years the only garage for all of Metrobus' London tendered routes since the award of route 61 in 1986. More recently routes have been operated from Godstone and in December 2005 a new depot was constructed in Croydon to cope with new tender awards. During mid-2005, major reconstruction started on the Green Street Green site to make improvements and provide an expansion. During these works, a temporary base was being used on Polhill, near Halstead, next to the base of what was Southlands Travel.
