= Epsom and St Helier University Hospitals NHS Trust =

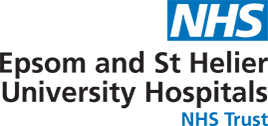
- Type: NHS trust
- Established: 1999; 27 years ago
- Hospitals: Epsom Hospital; St Helier Hospital
- Website: www.epsom-sthelier.nhs.uk

Epsom and St Helier University Hospitals NHS Trust is an NHS trust covering the London Borough of Sutton and north Surrey. It runs two main hospitals: Epsom Hospital and St Helier Hospital. It also runs a chronic fatigue and pain clinic at Sutton Hospital. The Trust was formed in 1999, bringing together four hospitals: Epsom, St Helier, Sutton and the former Queen Mary's Hospital for Children, Carshalton.

== Sutton Hospital ==
The former cottage hospital at Sutton, now known as the Malvern Centre, now houses only a chronic fatigue service, a centre of pain education, phlebotomy and a staff nursery. Eye services moved from there to the two other hospitals in April 2015.

In 2020 it was announced that a new emergency care facility is to be built in Sutton as part of a £500 million project with six core services moved to the new site. Merton London Borough Council objected to this because it would move vital health services away from to residents in the most deprived areas of Merton and into a more affluent place. They asked ask Matt Hancock to refer the proposed decision to the Independent Reconfiguration Panel. In November 2020 Hancock gave the project the go-ahead. Builders will start in spring 2022 and the new hospital should open in 2025. In 2022 it was reported that the date had been put back to until at least 2027 because the trust was still "waiting for feedback" on the next steps and funding of the project from central government.

== Performance ==
In December 2013 it was announced as one of 29 trusts out of 143 that had, according to the Dr Foster Hospital Guide, a hospital standardised mortality ratio (a measure of how many people would be expected to die with the actual rate of death) of 92.05. Dr Ruth Charlton, the trust's joint medical director, who leads on the Epsom site, added: "It's excellent news to see our ongoing commitment to our patients' safety is really paying off."

The trust is among the safest in the country according to Care Quality Commission indicators measured in 2014.

In 2014 the trust did well on the target of seeing 95% of people who attend accident and emergency departments within four hours. It achieved 95.7%, despite an 11% increase in A&E attendances in December. Experienced consultants see patients in A&E which reduces the numbers admitted. In February 2016 it was expecting a deficit of £28.4 million for the year 2015/6.

In 2021 the trust ended its contract with Mitie, bringing the cleaning and catering contracts back in house to boost workforce equality and support staff from minority ethnic communities. 40% of the cleaning, catering and portering staff are from black, Asian and minority ethnic communities.

== Criticism ==
In 2013, it was discovered that staff at the hospital and the neighbouring St Helier Hospital were accidentally overpaid by £294,000. A spokesman for the Epsom and St Helier trust responded by saying they "actively pursue overpayments via debt collection agencies who have demonstrated a very successful recovery rate."

== Future ==
Consultants from Deloitte were recorded on a train discussing plans to replace the two Trust hospitals with a single 800-bed super hospital for the area on the former Sutton Hospital site in April 2015. Chief executive Daniel Elkeles had given assurances that accident and emergency, maternity and children's services would be safe on both sites for the next five years. In response to this story he said "It is right that longer term planning should start now to tackle the serious problems facing local services and local NHS buildings, many of which were built in the 1930s and mean patients are being treated in inadequate conditions." Jeremy Hunt said: "The Conservative party doesn't support these plans and wouldn't implement them in government. We believe smaller local hospitals have a vital role to play in the future of our NHS."

== See also ==
- List of hospitals in England
- List of NHS trusts
