= Queen Mary's Hospital, Carshalton =

Children's hospital in London, England

Queen Mary's Hospital
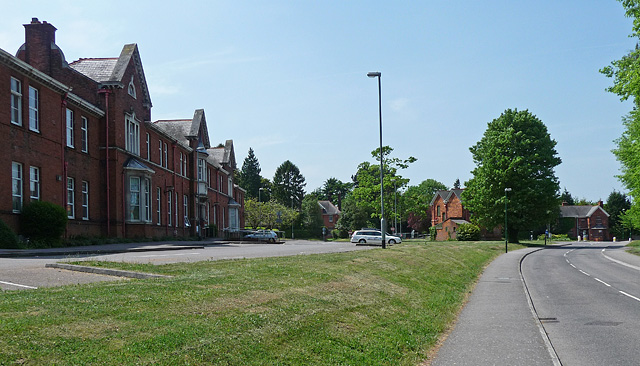
- Queen Mary's Hospital

- Location within the London Borough of Sutton

Geography
- Location: Carshalton, London, England
- Coordinates: 51.3490°N 0.1699°W

Organisation
- Type: Specialist

Services
- Speciality: Children's Hospital

History
- Founded: 1908
- Closed: 1993

Links
- Lists: Hospitals in England

Queen Mary's Hospital was a children's hospital in Carshalton, London, England.

== History ==
The hospital was built as the Southern Hospital in 1908. As local needs changed, it was converted into a children’s hospital and reopened as the Children's Infirmary in 1909. Following a visit by Queen Mary, it was renamed Queen Mary's Hospital for Children in 1915. Six additional blocks were completed in 1930. The hospital sustained heavy damage during the Second World War and joined the National Health Service in 1948.

Nurses' badges

After services were transferred to St Helier Hospital, Queen Mary's Hospital closed in 1993. Orchard Hill Hospital, a facility providing long-stay mental health services for adults with severe learning difficulties, remained on the site until 2009.
