= St Helier Hospital =

Hospital in London Borough of Sutton, UK

St Helier Hospital and Queen Mary's Hospital for Children
- Epsom and St Helier University Hospitals NHS Trust
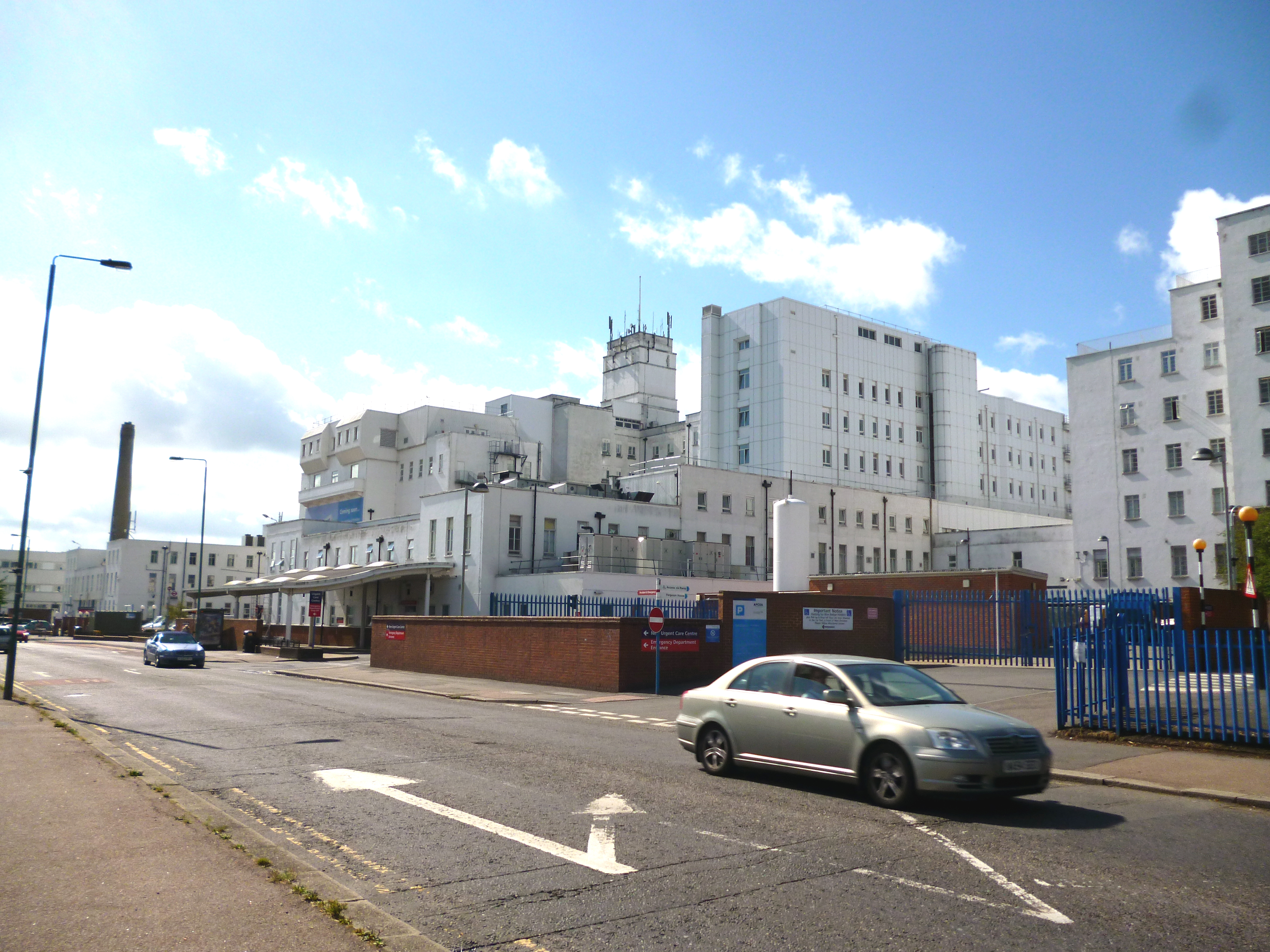

- Shown in Sutton

Geography
- Location: Wrythe Lane, St Helier, Sutton, Carshalton SM5 1AA, London, England, United Kingdom
- Coordinates: 51°22′49″N 0°11′01″W

Organisation
- Care system: NHS England
- Type: District General Hospital
- Affiliated university: St George's, University of London

Services
- Emergency department: Yes Accident & Emergency
- Beds: 629

History
- Founded: 26 March 1938; 88 years ago

Links
- Website: http://www.epsom-sthelier.nhs.uk
- Lists: Hospitals in England

St Helier Hospital (full title: St Helier Hospital and Queen Mary's Hospital for Children) in the London Borough of Sutton is run by Epsom and St Helier University Hospitals NHS Trust along with Epsom Hospital. It is located next to the large St Helier council estate and close to the major intersection known as Rosehill.

The hospital offers a full range of hospital services including a 24-hour accident and emergency department. The site is also home to the South West Renal and Transplantation Service and the Queen Mary's Hospital for Children, a dedicated children's hospital. St Helier Hospital is a major teaching hospital for St George's, University of London, and is a main teaching site for medical degrees.

== History ==
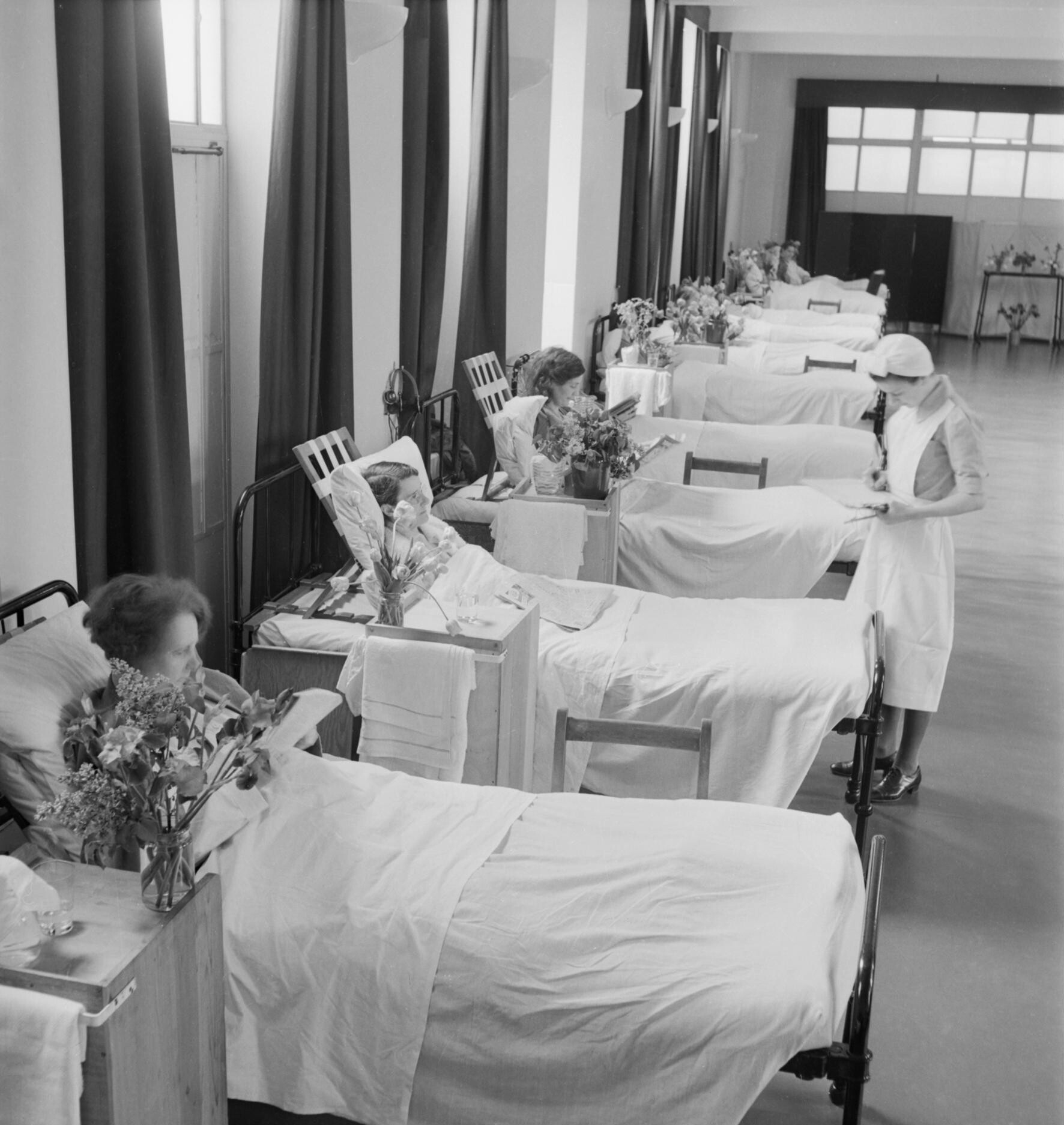
A ward at St Helier Hospital in 1943

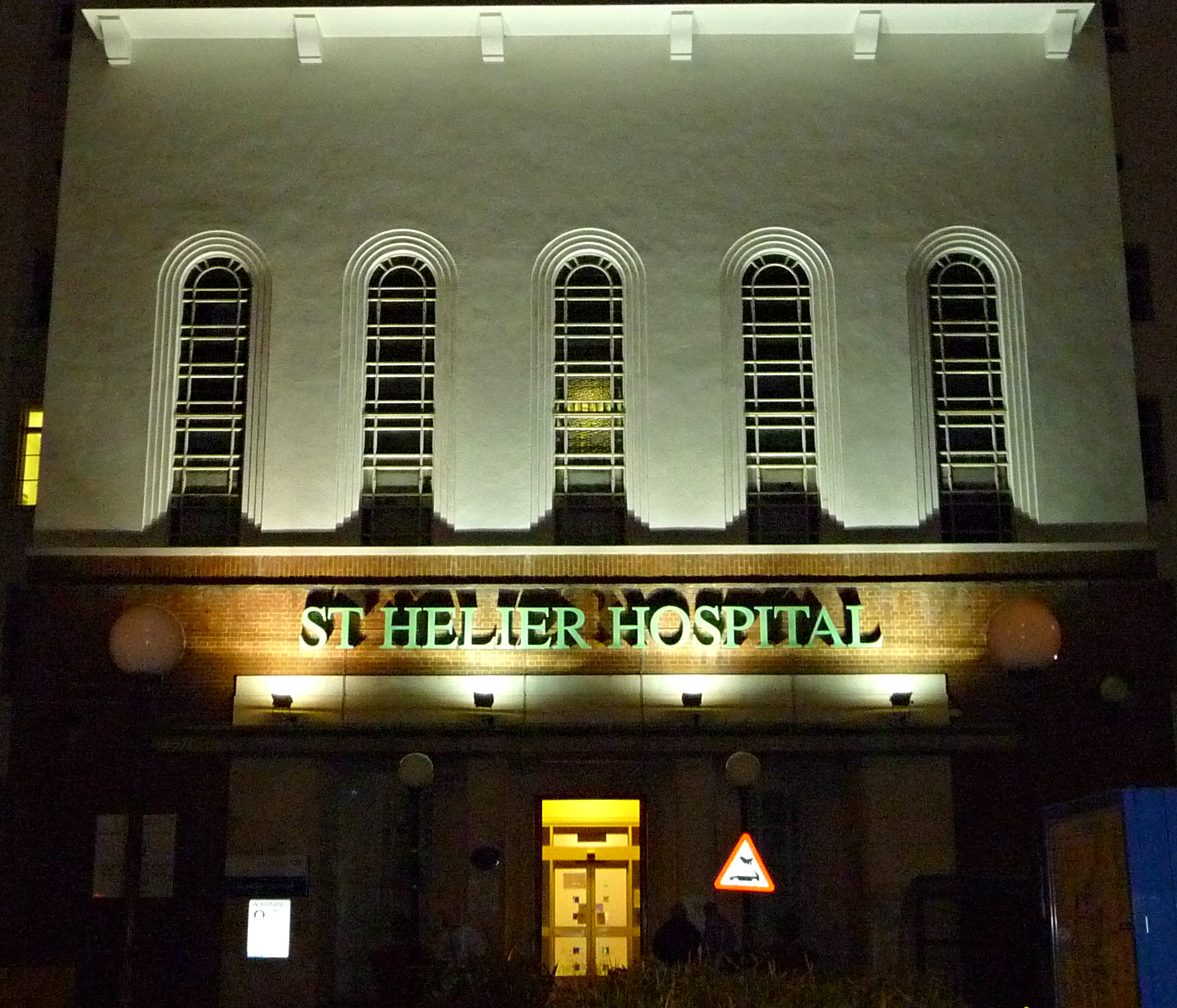
The art deco entrance of St Helier Hospital floodlit at night in 2009

The hospital was commissioned in 1934 when Surrey County Council acquired a 999-year lease of 10 acres of land on the St Helier council estate which had been named in honour of Mary Jeune, Baroness St Helier, a prominent alderman on the London County Council. Queen Mary laid the foundation stone for the new hospital on 26 March 1938. It was designed by Saxon Snell & Phillips, who were chosen for their experience in hospital design, in the thirties modernist style. It received its first patients in February 1941 during the Second World War.

Less than a month later, the hospital was damaged in a bombing raid by a parachute mine. John Major, the former Prime Minister was born in the hospital in 1943. Further damage was caused in later raids and the hospital was struck by two flying bombs in June 1944. St Helier Hospital remained functional throughout the War and was painted green to make it less visible to German bombers in the latter years of the war. It joined the National Health Service in 1948.

The Queen Mother visited the hospital in 1963, during the hospital's jubilee year and, in 1987, Diana Princess of Wales opened the new maternity unit. Services were transferred from Queen Mary's Hospital for Children in 1993. St Helier Hospital came under the management of the Epsom and St Helier University Hospitals NHS Trust in 1999.

In November 2013, as part of the Better Services Better Value Review of NHS services in London, the trust proposed the downgrading of the maternity and Accident and Emergency Departments.

== Services ==
The main building is divided into three blocks: A, B and C. The other buildings are:

- The pathology block (labelled D) which also contains the genitourinary medicine clinic
- The Women's Health Block (labelled E) (which contains the maternity and gynaecology wards, gynaecology clinics and delivery suite)
- Ferguson House (labelled F) (contains some outpatient clinics, administration departments and undergraduate teaching suite)
- Queen Mary's Hospital for Children (labelled J)
- The renal block (labelled K)

== Transport links ==
London Buses routes 151, 157, S1 and S2 stop outside the hospital.

The nearest London Underground station is Morden Underground station, from which there are frequent buses to the hospital via Rose Hill (about 5 minutes walk from the hospital). The nearest National Rail station is St Helier station which is slightly less than one mile from the hospital (about a 15-minute walk), although this is infrequently served (only 1 train every 30 minutes off-peak).

== Criticism ==
The hospital has attracted some criticism because of the deteriorating physical condition of the buildings, some of which date from the 1940s. Writing in The Observer newspaper, the chief medical officer of the trust, Dr Ruth Charlton, described the hospital as "dilapidated and unpleasant", with regular basement flooding and emergency ward closures.

On 13 January 2025, the phlebotomy department closed due to flooding from a partial ceiling collapse. This led to the rescheduling of many blood tests, with patients redirected to other facilities for urgent tests. The trust apologised for the inconvenience and assured that routine blood tests would resume the following day. This incident highlighted ongoing concerns about the hospital's infrastructure, which is part of a broader maintenance backlog for London hospitals, estimated at over £3.6 billion. However, there is hope for future improvements, as the hospital may receive funding from The King's Fund through the New Hospital Programme, which aims to address such infrastructure issues.

On 20 January 2025, in the House of Commons, Health Secretary Wes Streeting confirmed that works on a new hospital building in Sutton would not begin until 2033 at the earliest, placing it in 'wave two' of the New Hospital Programme.

== Notable births ==
- John Major – Prime Minister of the United Kingdom 1990–1997
- Harry Aikines-Aryeetey – athlete
- Elliot Colburn – MP for Carshalton and Wallington 2019–2024

== See also ==
- List of hospitals in England
- List of NHS trusts
