= Epsom Hospital =

- Epsom and St Helier University Hospitals NHS Trust
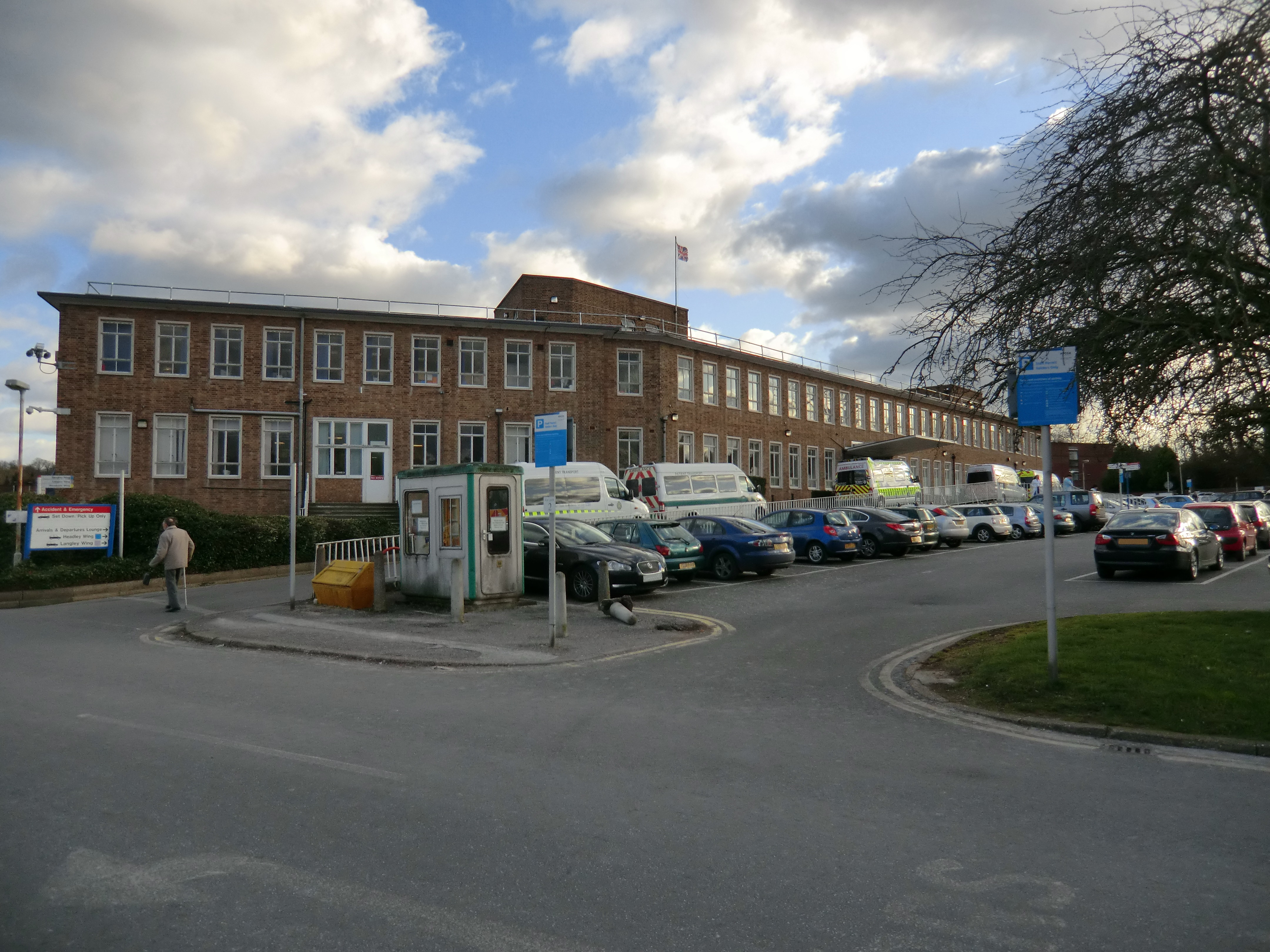

- Shown in Surrey

Geography
- Location: Dorking Road, Epsom, Surrey, KT18 7EG, England, United Kingdom
- Coordinates: 51.325359°N 0.27387°W

Organisation
- Care system: Public NHS
- Type: District General Hospital
- Affiliated university: St George's, University of London

Services
- Emergency department: Yes Accident and Emergency

Links
- Website: www.epsom-sthelier.nhs.uk
- Lists: Hospitals in England

Epsom Hospital is a teaching hospital in Epsom, Surrey, England. The hospital is situated on Dorking Road 1 kilometre (0.62 mi) south east of the centre of Epsom. It is managed by the Epsom and St Helier University Hospitals NHS Trust along with the nearby St Helier Hospital.

== History ==
The hospital has it origins in a cottage hospital which opened with just eight beds in 1873. The current building opened as a workhouse infirmary in 1890. It was staffed by volunteers until it joined the National Health Service in 1948.

In 2011, it was revealed that the hospital was at risk of losing its accident and emergency services as part of a Better Services Better Value (BSBV) programme, which would rationalise hospital facilities across Surrey and south west London. In 2013, local MP Chris Grayling said that constituents should show their support by turning up at a consultation event in good numbers to indicate "the strength of feeling locally" about retaining these services at the hospital.

Epsom Hospital was in the news in August 2018 after a stray cat was found in a linen basket.

In 2019 part of the Dorking Road site was sold for £18 million to Legal & General, which set up a partnership with specialist older persons housing provider Guild Living to create an residential complex.

== Services ==
The hospital contains an accident and emergency and a range of diagnostic and supporting services including pathology, radiology (including CT, MRI and ultrasound), the South West London Elective Orthopaedic Centre (SWLEOC) which calls itself a "centre of excellence", vascular diagnostic services and an acute psychiatric facility operated by Surrey and Borders Partnership NHS Foundation Trust.

== Radio station ==
The hospital has its own radio service, "Epsom Hospital Radio", which is a registered charity and is staffed by volunteers. Since 1979, its mascot has been Ruddles The Bear, which was named after a competition in the Epsom Guardian.

== See also ==
- Epsom Cluster, a group of psychiatric hospitals near Epsom
- List of hospitals in England
