= List of listed buildings in Edinburgh/6 =

This is a list of listed buildings in Edinburgh, Scotland.

== List ==
Name	Location	Date listed	Grid ref. (Note: Sometimes known as OSGB36, the grid reference (where provided) is based on the British national grid reference system used by the Ordnance Survey. • "Guide to National Grid". Ordnance Survey. • "Get-a-map". Ordnance Survey.)	Geo-coordinates	Notes	LB number (Note: Historic Environment Scotland assign a unique alphanumeric identifier to each designated site in Scotland, for listed buildings this always begins with "LB", for example "LB12345".)	Image
112-112A And 114 Newhaven Road With Front Wall And Railings; Eh6 4Br				55°58′24″N 3°11′18″W	Category B	27195	Upload Photo
116 And 118 (Gf And 1F) Newhaven Road With Front Wall; Eh6 4Br				55°58′25″N 3°11′18″W	Category C(S)	27204	Upload Photo
4-10 (Even Nos) Pittville Street				55°57′07″N 3°06′21″W	Category B	27206	Upload another image
1 Newmills Road, (Newmills House) And 3 Newmills Road, (Currie Riggs) With Garden Wall, Bee-Boles, Topiary Hedge, Stables And Boundary Wall And Gatepiers				55°53′24″N 3°19′57″W	Category B	27208	Upload Photo
79, 81 And 81A Colinton Road				55°55′49″N 3°13′17″W	Category C(S)	27211	Upload Photo
5A, 5B And 5C Kirkgate, Liberton Parish Church With Memorials, Session House, Graveyard, Gates And Gatepiers, Walls And Railings				55°54′48″N 3°09′39″W	Category A	27090	Upload another image
Glasgow Road, Castle Gogar With Cottage, Gate House, Stables, Outbuildings, Gate And Gatepiers				55°56′32″N 3°20′20″W	Category A	27092	Upload Photo
1 Gillsland Road Tornaveen House				55°55′55″N 3°13′18″W	Category B	27094	Upload another image
Lymphoy House With Urn, Garden Seats, Sundial, Gatepiers And Boundary Wall				55°53′21″N 3°19′23″W	Category B	27096	Upload Photo
16 And 17 Cluny Avenue				55°55′33″N 3°12′11″W	Category B	27099	Upload Photo
88 Lothian Road, Filmhouse Including Boundary Walls And Gatepiers				55°56′47″N 3°12′22″W	Category B	27100	Upload Photo
4 Main Street Royal Bank Of Scotland With Boundary Wall				55°53′04″N 3°20′24″W	Category C(S)	27115	Upload Photo
31-39 (Odd Nos) Madeira Street With Front And Garden Walls, Steps And Railings; Eh6 4Aj				55°58′32″N 3°10′56″W	Category C(S)	27120	Upload Photo
Glasgow Road Gogarburn Hospital Gogarburn House				55°56′03″N 3°20′21″W	Category B	27121	Upload Photo
59 And 61 Morton Street				55°56′50″N 3°05′55″W	Category C(S)	27122	Upload Photo
37 And 39 Cluny Gardens				55°55′30″N 3°12′10″W	Category C(S)	27127	Upload Photo
24 And 26 Main Street, Balerno Hardware And Pharmacy				55°53′02″N 3°20′21″W	Category C(S)	27131	Upload Photo
34 And 36 Brighton Place				55°57′06″N 3°07′01″W	Category B	27132	Upload Photo
28-32 (Even Nos) Main Street				55°53′02″N 3°20′20″W	Category C(S)	27138	Upload Photo
42 And 44 Brighton Place				55°57′04″N 3°07′03″W	Category B	27146	Upload Photo
25 Spylaw Road, Elmpark With Boundary Wall And Gatepiers				55°55′57″N 3°13′04″W	Category C(S)	27023	Upload another image
527, Lanark Road West, Ravelrig Estate, Gatepiers And Boundary Wall				55°53′17″N 3°20′42″W	Category B	27025	Upload Photo
Greyfriars Place, Greyfriars Churchyard, Including Monuments, Lodge Gatepiers, Railings And Walls				55°56′45″N 3°11′32″W	Category A	27029	Upload another image See more images
5 And 7 Joppa Road Including Boundary Walls				55°56′57″N 3°06′06″W	Category B	27032	Upload Photo
87, 89 Restalrig Road With Gatepiers, Boundary Walls And Lamp Standard				55°58′02″N 3°09′25″W	Category C(S)	27034	Upload Photo
13 And 15 Church Hill With Stable Block, Boundary Walls And_Gatepiers				55°55′58″N 3°12′21″W	Category B	27038	Upload Photo
29 Joppa Road (Hawthorn Cottage) Including Gateway And Boundary Walls				55°56′56″N 3°06′00″W	Category B	27052	Upload Photo
11 Ettrick Road				55°56′04″N 3°13′15″W	Category B	27053	Upload another image
4-8 (Inclusive Nos) Church Hill Drive				55°55′56″N 3°12′27″W	Category C(S)	27058	Upload Photo
2 Ettrick Road Kilmeny With Garage Gardener's Cottage Boundary Wall Gatepiers Gates And Railings				55°55′59″N 3°13′13″W	Category C(S)	27064	Upload Photo
3 Seafield Avenue, Seafield Cemetery Gate Lodge With Pavilion, Boundary Wall, Gatepiers And Railings				55°58′14″N 3°09′05″W	Category B	27065	Upload Photo
6 And 8 Brighton Place				55°57′10″N 3°06′54″W	Category B	27067	Upload Photo
9 And 11 Infirmary Street				55°56′54″N 3°11′08″W	Category B	27080	Upload Photo
Leith Docks, Victoria Dock And Lock Gates				55°58′45″N 3°10′24″W	Category B	27081	Upload Photo
Foxhall Stables And Cottages				55°57′08″N 3°23′37″W	Category C(S)	27082	Upload Photo
6, 8 Seafield Road With Railings				55°58′16″N 3°09′04″W	Category B	27085	Upload Photo
Lymphoy Estate, Lennox Tower				55°53′25″N 3°19′22″W	Category B	27086	Upload Photo
14 And 16 Brighton Place				55°57′09″N 3°06′56″W	Category B	27087	Upload Photo
20-26 (Even Nos) Bernard Street				55°58′34″N 3°10′03″W	Category B	26935	Upload Photo
42 Canaan Lane				55°55′41″N 3°12′18″W	Category C(S)	26936	Upload Photo
28 Bernard Street And 47, 47A Timber Bush				55°58′34″N 3°10′04″W	Category B	26947	Upload Photo
Mcleod Street, Tynecastle High School With Workshops, Gates, Gatepiers And Railings				55°56′27″N 3°13′57″W	Category B	26950	Upload another image
9-17 (Odd Nos) Pirniefield Place With Boundary Wall				55°58′12″N 3°09′06″W	Category C(S)	26967	Upload Photo
16A Bellfield Street, Portobello Old And Windsor Parish Church (Church Of Scotland), Including Gates, Gatepiers And Boundary Walls				55°57′08″N 3°06′30″W	Category B	26969	Upload another image
38-42 (Even Nos) Bernard Street				55°58′34″N 3°10′07″W	Category B	26971	Upload Photo
67 Restalrig Road With Boundary Wall				55°58′05″N 3°09′29″W	Category C(S)	26990	Upload Photo
68-78 (Even Nos) Colinton Road With Railings				55°55′35″N 3°14′00″W	Category B	27001	Upload Photo
St. Cuthbert's Churchyard, The Dell Colinton				55°54′34″N 3°15′23″W	Category B	26875	Upload Photo
Carlowrie House With Terrace, Toolshed Tower, Lodge And Gatepiers, Stables And Cottage, Garden Walls And Walled Garden				55°57′20″N 3°22′33″W	Category A	26879	Upload Photo
2-3 Hermitage Place, Merith House Hotel With Boundary Wall				55°58′09″N 3°09′50″W	Category B	26882	Upload Photo
Harlaw Road, Balleny Bridge				55°52′29″N 3°19′14″W	Category C(S)	26883	Upload Photo
Kirk Loan And 2A Corstorphine High Street, Corstorphine Old Parish Church And Churchyard Including Boundary Walls, Vault And Gate House, Gatepiers, Gates And War Memorial				55°56′29″N 3°16′55″W	Category A	26888	Upload Photo
Clifton Hall With Stables, Outbuildings, Dovecot And Clifton Beag				55°55′23″N 3°25′35″W	Category A	26891	Upload Photo
22 Colinton Road With Boundary Walls Gatepiers And Railings				55°55′54″N 3°13′07″W	Category C(S)	26893	Upload Photo
4 Bernard Street				55°58′32″N 3°10′01″W	Category B	26898	Upload Photo
6-13 (Inclusive Nos) Hermitage Place With Boundary Walls				55°58′09″N 3°09′54″W	Category B	26906	Upload Photo
6-10 (Even Nos) Bernard Street				55°58′33″N 3°10′01″W	Category B	26910	Upload Photo
18 Cramond Glebe Road, Cramond Parish Church (Church Of Scotland) Including Graveyard, Gatehouse, Gatepiers, Gates And Boundary Wall				55°58′40″N 3°18′00″W	Category A	26912	Upload Photo
Johnsburn Road, Johnsburn House With Stables, Bridge And Gatepiers				55°52′49″N 3°21′02″W	Category B	26919	Upload Photo
40 Canaan Lane With Boundary Wall				55°55′40″N 3°12′20″W	Category C(S)	26923	Upload Photo
Duddingston Parish Church (C Of S) Including Churchyard And Watch Tower Old Church Lane Duddingston				55°56′28″N 3°08′56″W	Category A	26924	Upload Photo
Haymarket Terrace, Ryrie's (Formerly Haymarket Inn)				55°56′45″N 3°13′02″W	Category B	26926	Upload another image
89-93 (Odd Nos) Ferry Road With 89A And 93A And Boundary Walls, Steps And Railings; Eh6 4Aq				55°58′29″N 3°10′59″W	Category C(S)	26927	Upload Photo
Commercial Street And Dock Street, Former Mariner's Church				55°58′37″N 3°10′29″W	Category C(S)	26800	Upload Photo
137-155 Odd Nos Colinton Road				55°55′33″N 3°14′00″W	Category C(S)	26803	Upload Photo
Distillery Lane And Dalry Road, Caledonian Distillery				55°56′40″N 3°13′13″W	Category B	26811	Upload Photo
1-4 (Inclusive Nos) Elcho Terrace				55°57′06″N 3°06′21″W	Category B	26827	Upload Photo
Glenbrook Road, House Of Cockburn (Formerly Westbrook) With Boundary Wall, Gates And Gatepiers				55°52′38″N 3°22′08″W	Category B	26830	Upload Photo
33 Bernard Street				55°58′33″N 3°10′06″W	Category B	26834	Upload Photo
102 Commercial Street, Bonds 46, 48 And 35 (Highland And Queen, West Warehouses) With Gatepiers				55°58′39″N 3°10′31″W	Category A	26838	Upload Photo
Bonnington Dovecot				55°54′26″N 3°25′22″W	Category A	26839	Upload Photo
4-12 (Inclusive Nos) Gladstone Place With Boundary Wall				55°58′11″N 3°09′34″W	Category C(S)	26842	Upload Photo
7 Lorne Street, Lorne Primary School, With Janitor's House, Outbuilding, Shelter And Gatepiers				55°57′57″N 3°10′29″W	Category B	26845	Upload Photo
Dalry Place, The Dalry Terrs; Dalry Rd 15-29 & 31-47 Walker Terr 9-16 Lewis Terr 9-16 Cobden Terr 1-16 Douglas Terr 1-16 Bright Terr 1-16, Argyll Terr 1-16 Mclaren Terr 1-10 Atholl Terr 1-16, Breadalbane Terr 1-18 With Railgs & Grdn Walls				55°56′42″N 3°13′03″W	Category B	26746	Upload Photo
50 Coburg Street And 9 (Flats 1-26) And 12 Couper Street				55°58′34″N 3°10′37″W	Category B	26747	Upload Photo
13 Bangor Road, Salvation Army Hall				55°58′23″N 3°10′38″W	Category C(S)	26756	Upload Photo
2-18 Inclusive Nos Shandon Crescent 1-5 Odd Nos Shandon Road And 29 Shandon Street With Boundary Walls				55°56′01″N 3°13′56″W	Category C(S)	26768	Upload Photo
68-70 (Even Nos) Leamington Terrace, Bruntsfield Evangelical Church And Hall Including Boundary Walls, Gatepiers, Gates And Railings				55°56′17″N 3°12′26″W	Category B	26772	Upload another image
10, 11 Claremont Park With Boundary Wall And Gatepiers				55°58′11″N 3°09′17″W	Category B	26778	Upload Photo
9 And 11 Braid Road				55°55′26″N 3°12′32″W	Category B	26784	Upload Photo
1-4 (Inclusive Nos) Bath Place				55°57′18″N 3°06′42″W	Category B	26702	Upload Photo
Ardmillan Terrace North Merchiston Cemetery With Lodge Gates And Boundary Walls				55°56′15″N 3°13′36″W	Category C(S)	26704	Upload Photo
1-12 (Inclusive Nos And 6A/B) Bonnington Terrace With Boundary Walls And Railings; Eh6 4Bp				55°58′23″N 3°11′19″W	Category B	26709	Upload Photo
4-26 Even Nos Blantyre Terrace 2 Merchiston Avenue And 1 Mardale Crescent				55°56′03″N 3°12′45″W	Category C(S)	26712	Upload another image
24 Dalmeny Street, And Buchanan Street, Ukrainian Catholic Church Of St Andrew				55°57′53″N 3°10′29″W	Category B	26716	Upload another image See more images
1 Wright's Houses, Barclay-Bruntsfield Church And Church Hall (Church Of Scotland)				55°56′25″N 3°12′12″W	Category A	26720	Upload another image
13 Bonnington Terrace And 203 Ferry Road, (1F And 2F) Bonnington Mount, With Boundary Walls And Gatepiers; Eh6 4Bp And Eh6 4Nn Respectively				55°58′25″N 3°11′22″W	Category B	26722	Upload Photo
4-20 Bruntsfield Avenue				55°56′11″N 3°12′32″W	Category C(S)	26725	Upload Photo
1-9 (Inclusive Nos) Albert Terrace				55°55′52″N 3°12′41″W	Category B	26732	Upload another image
Coburg Street, North Leith Burial Ground				55°58′33″N 3°10′31″W	Category B	26735	Upload Photo
158-174 Even Nos Bruntsfield Place And 2 Bruntsfield Avenue				55°56′11″N 3°12′32″W	Category B	26738	Upload Photo
45 Bavelaw Road, Balerno Bank Paper Mill Offices				55°52′58″N 3°20′19″W	Category B	26740	Upload Photo
3-17 Odd Nos Blantyre Terrace 6 Rochester Terrace And 4 Merchiston Avenue				55°56′04″N 3°12′45″W	Category C(S)	26699	Upload another image
Old Dalkeith Road Summerside Farmhouse, Stables And Cottage Range				55°54′03″N 3°05′43″W	Category B	14186	Upload Photo
Baberton House, Including Gates, Gatepiers And Boundary Walls				55°54′33″N 3°17′45″W	Category A	6129	Upload Photo
Dalmeny Village, 1 And 2 Easter Dalmeny				55°58′57″N 3°22′21″W	Category C(S)	5528	Upload Photo
Dalmeny Village, 1 And 2 Main Street				55°58′56″N 3°22′19″W	Category C(S)	5532	Upload Photo
Dalmeny Village, 5 Main Street				55°58′55″N 3°22′22″W	Category B	5534	Upload Photo
Bankhead, Bankhead Farmhouse, Including Gatepiers And Boundary Wall				55°59′19″N 3°22′39″W	Category C(S)	5551	Upload Photo
Craigiehall, Sundials				55°57′52″N 3°20′15″W	Category A	5559	Upload Photo
Craigiehall, Dovecot				55°57′54″N 3°20′16″W	Category B	5560	Upload Photo
Dalmeny House, Laundry At Dalmeny Home Farm				55°58′48″N 3°19′57″W	Category C(S)	5500	Upload Photo
Dundas Castle, Walled Garden				55°58′21″N 3°25′13″W	Category B	5515	Upload Photo
Lowood, Including Outbuildings, Boundary Walls And Gatepiers				55°58′19″N 3°19′54″W	Category B	5519	Upload Photo
12-16 (Inclusive Nos) Bank Street				55°56′59″N 3°11′35″W	Category B	3006	Upload another image
Dalmeny Village, 4 Wester Dalmeny				55°58′57″N 3°22′25″W	Category C(S)	81	Upload Photo
4 Marine Drive And 11 West Shore Road, Granton Gasworks, Entrance Gateway And Gatehouse On West Granton Road				55°58′36″N 3°14′45″W	Category C(S)	45792	Upload Photo
4 Marine Drive And 11 West Shore Road, Granton Gasworks, Former Station/Office, Including Railway Platform				55°58′42″N 3°14′29″W	Category B	45794	Upload Photo
46 Frogston Road West, Including Garage, Boundary Wall And Terrace With Planters				55°53′56″N 3°11′44″W	Category C(S)	45839	Upload Photo
13 And 14 Swanston Village				55°53′33″N 3°13′01″W	Category B	45848	Upload Photo
25 Winton Loan				55°53′47″N 3°11′41″W	Category C(S)	45851	Upload Photo
27-31 (Odd Nos) Winton Loan				55°53′47″N 3°11′41″W	Category C(S)	45852	Upload Photo
4 And 5 Bonnyhaugh Lane				55°58′16″N 3°11′18″W	Category C(S)	45923	Upload Photo
21-25 (Odd Nos) Broughton Place				55°57′31″N 3°11′16″W	Category B	45926	Upload Photo
14-18 (Even Nos) Broughton Place				55°57′32″N 3°11′20″W	Category A	45928	Upload Photo
20-28 (Even Nos) Broughton Place				55°57′32″N 3°11′19″W	Category A	45929	Upload Photo
30-34 (Even Nos) Broughton Place				55°57′33″N 3°11′17″W	Category A	45930	Upload Photo
93-101 (Odd Nos) Broughton Street And 2 Broughton Place				55°57′31″N 3°11′23″W	Category B	45932	Upload Photo
51-77 (Odd Nos) East Claremont Street				55°57′44″N 3°11′32″W	Category A	45940	Upload Photo
1-9 (Odd Nos) East London Street				55°57′33″N 3°11′25″W	Category B	45942	Upload Photo
5 And 5A Forth Street				55°57′27″N 3°11′16″W	Category B	45945	Upload Photo
19-27 (Odd Nos) Forth Street				55°57′28″N 3°11′13″W	Category B	45948	Upload Photo
14 And 16 Forth Street				55°57′29″N 3°11′15″W	Category B	45950	Upload Photo
26 Forth Street				55°57′29″N 3°11′12″W	Category B	45954	Upload Photo
28 And 30 Forth Street				55°57′29″N 3°11′11″W	Category B	45955	Upload Photo
Mcdonald Road, Bridgeside Works Including Boundary Walls And Gatepiers				55°57′54″N 3°11′11″W	Category C(S)	45958	Upload Photo
30 And 32 Pilrig Street And Boundary Walls				55°57′52″N 3°10′46″W	Category C(S)	45959	Upload Photo
94 Pilrig Street And Boundary Walls And Railings				55°58′00″N 3°10′56″W	Category B	45960	Upload Photo
1-28 (Inclusive Nos) Shaw's Street, 1-10 (Inclusive Nos) Shaw's Place And 1-18 (Inclusive Nos) Shaw's Terrace				55°57′50″N 3°10′53″W	Category B	45961	Upload Photo
45-57A (Odd Nos) Albany Street, Including Railings				55°57′27″N 3°11′21″W	Category A	46114	Upload Photo
9-31B (Odd Nos) Barony Street, And 1 And 2 Albany Lane, Including Wall And Letter Box				55°57′29″N 3°11′27″W	Category C(S)	46115	Upload Photo
1-3 (Odd Nos) Cornwallis Place, Including Railings				55°57′40″N 3°11′41″W	Category C(S)	46118	Upload Photo
Great Stuart Street, Lamp Standard				55°57′10″N 3°12′38″W	Category B	46119	Upload Photo
Moray Place Bank Gardens, Railings And Gates				55°57′17″N 3°12′31″W	Category A	46120	Upload Photo
2-16 (Even Nos) Cluny Place				55°55′35″N 3°12′05″W	Category B	46294	Upload Photo
8-30 (Even Nos) Morningside Park				55°55′41″N 3°12′39″W	Category B	46295	Upload another image
237 Morningside Road, The Canny Man's				55°55′39″N 3°12′33″W	Category B	46297	Upload Photo
1-31 (Inclusive Nos) Earl Haig Gardens				55°58′29″N 3°12′16″W	Category C(S)	46726	Upload Photo
Ferry Road, Bridge Over Former Railway				55°58′19″N 3°12′06″W	Category B	46730	Upload Photo
29 Primrose Bank Road, Wardie Parish Church And Hall (Church Of Scotland)				55°58′43″N 3°12′39″W	Category B	46741	Upload Photo
36-42 (Even Nos) Primrose Bank Road, With Boundary Walls And Gatepiers				55°58′46″N 3°12′37″W	Category B	46745	Upload Photo
120-134 (Even Nos) Trinity Road, With Boundary Wall				55°58′44″N 3°12′22″W	Category C(S)	46753	Upload Photo
45 Ratcliffe Terrace, Leslie's Bar				55°56′02″N 3°10′41″W	Category B	46775	Upload another image
1-3 (Inclusive Nos) Lauriston Terrace Including Access Terrace And Railings				55°56′41″N 3°11′42″W	Category B	47045	Upload another image
Tollcross, Clock				55°56′37″N 3°12′13″W	Category C(S)	47048	Upload Photo
Dreghorn Loan, Laverock Dale Cottage				55°54′09″N 3°15′00″W	Category C(S)	47283	Upload Photo
3 Bristo Place, Seventh Day Adventist Church				55°56′47″N 3°11′24″W	Category B	47341	Upload another image
21 St John Street, Chancery Of The Order Of St John In Scotland, Including Boundary Wall, Gates And Railings				55°57′02″N 3°10′53″W	Category C(S)	47586	Upload another image
89-93 (Odd Nos) Marchmont Road				55°56′09″N 3°11′38″W	Category B	47603	Upload another image
Crawfurd Road, Former Club House				55°55′52″N 3°10′02″W	Category C(S)	47605	Upload Photo

== Key ==
The scheme for classifying buildings in Scotland is:

- Category A: "buildings of national or international importance, either architectural or historic; or fine, little-altered examples of some particular period, style or building type."
- Category B: "buildings of regional or more than local importance; or major examples of some particular period, style or building type, which may have been altered."
- Category C: "buildings of local importance; lesser examples of any period, style, or building type, as originally constructed or moderately altered; and simple traditional buildings which group well with other listed buildings."

In March 2016 there were 47,288 listed buildings in Scotland. Of these, 8% were Category A, and 50% were Category B, with the remaining 42% being Category C.

== See also ==
- List of listed buildings in Edinburgh
