= George Craig =

George Craig may refer to:

- George Henry Craig (1845–1923), U.S. Representative from Alabama
- George Craig (baseball) (1887–1911), baseball player for 1907 Philadelphia Athletics
- George N. Craig (1909–1992), governor of Indiana
- George Craig (musician) (born 1990), English frontman of band One Night Only
- George B. Craig (1930–1995), American biologist and entomologist
- George Craig (architect) (1852–1927), Scottish architect and amateur geologist
