= List of banks in Scotland =

This is a list of banks headquartered in Scotland.

== Banks in Scotland ==
- Adam and Company
- Bank of Scotland
- Clydesdale Bank
- Royal Bank of Scotland
- Tesco Bank
- TSB Bank
- NatWest Group

== Former banks ==
- Airdrie Savings Bank
- British Linen Bank
- City of Glasgow Bank
- Commercial Bank of Scotland
- Douglas, Heron & Company
- Glasgow and Ship Bank
- Leith Banking Company
- National Bank of Scotland
- National Commercial Bank of Scotland
- Sainsbury's Bank

== Banknotes ==
- Banknotes of Scotland
- Banknotes of the pound sterling

== See also ==
- Chartered Institute of Bankers in Scotland
- Scottish bankers
