= George Craig (architect) =

Scottish architect (1852–1927)

George Craig JP EGS (17 January 1852 – 27 March 1927) was a Scottish architect and amateur geologist. He created a very high proportion of the 19th century public buildings in Leith.

== Life ==
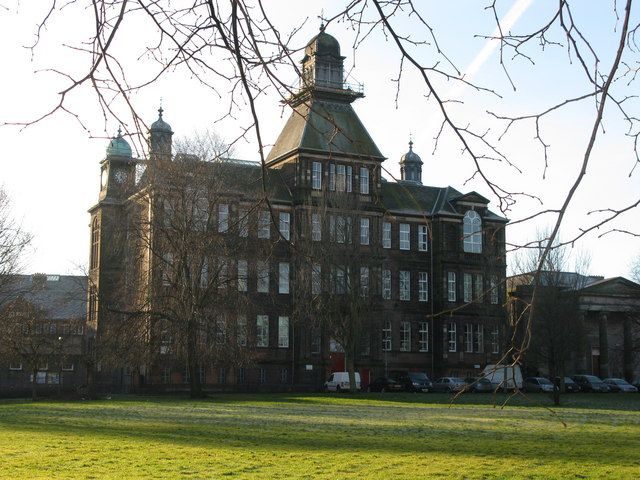
Leith Primary School

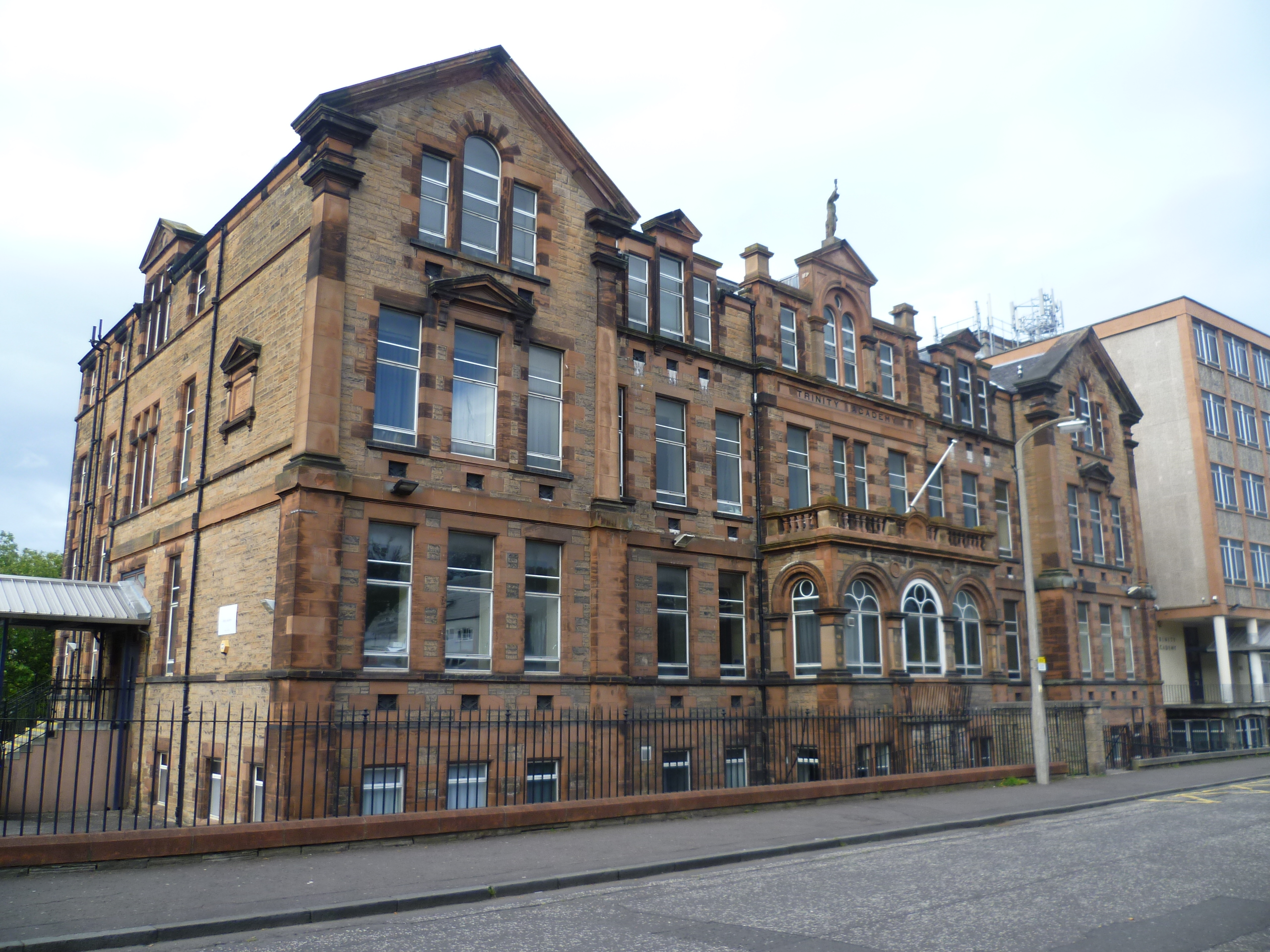
Trinity Academy

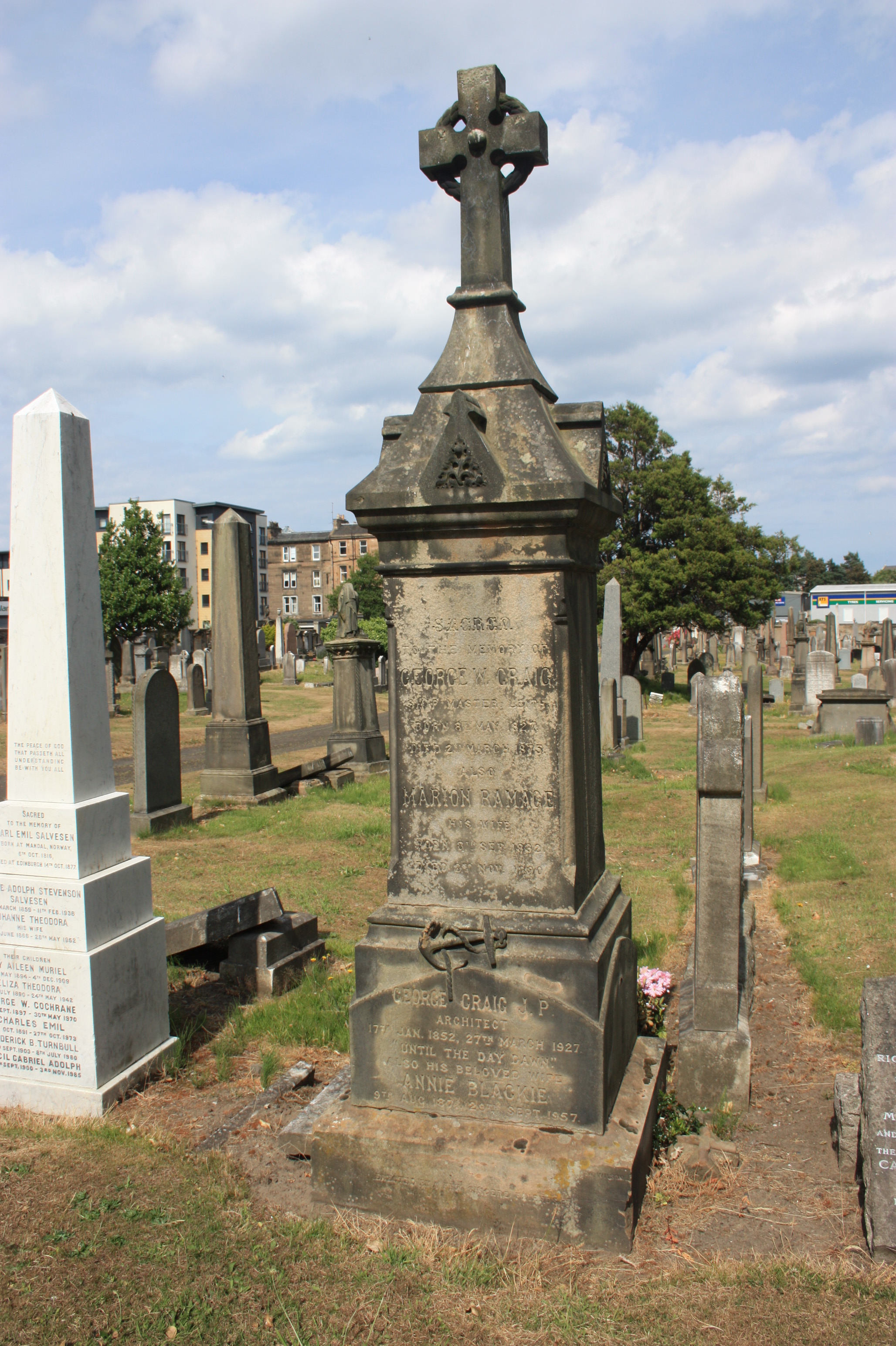
The grave of George Craig, architect, Rosebank Cemetery

He was born on 17 January 1852. He was the son of George W. Craig, shipmaster (1827-1876) and his wife Marion Ramage.

In 1867 Craig was articled to the local Leith architect, James Simpson, to train as a draughtsman. In 1871 he decided to train further as an architect and attended classes both at the Edinburgh Royal Institution and the Leith School of Art. In the 1870s he worked as an assistant variously to Robert Rowand Anderson and John Lessels, before setting up his own practice around 1881. In 1876 (independent of Anderson and Lessels) he received a major commission from the newly created Leith School Board to design all of Leith’s schools required to meet the requirements of the new Education Act (which required all children to be educated at state expense).

In 1885 he was styling himself “architect” without objection and running an office from 85 Constitution Street and living at 6 East Hermitage Place on Leith Links. In 1886, he relocated to 3 Bernard Street. He was not admitted into the RIBA until 1911, aged 59.

He died on 27 March 1927. He is buried under a monument which he erected to his father, almost certainly to his own design, in Rosebank Cemetery in northern Edinburgh. The grave lies on the main east-west path, roughly opposite the distinctive grave of Christian Salvesen.

== Publications ==
- Building Stones used in Edinburgh (1892)

== Family ==
He was married to Annie Blackie (1851-1957) who died at the very advanced age of 105.

== Works ==
- Leith Swimming Pool (Victoria Baths) Great Junction Street
- Lochend Road School, Leith (1885)
- Large warehouse on Pattison Street, Leith (1887/8)
- Trafalgar Masonic Lodge, Leith (1888)
- Yardheads School, Leith (1888) demolished
- Couper Street School, Leith (1889) demolished 1988
- Rear extension to Dr Bell’s School, Great Junction Street, Leith (1890) front by R & R Dickson
- Craighall Road School (1891) later renamed Trinity Academy
- Rebuilding of parish church, Skirling, Scottish Borders (1893)
- Shop for William Nimmo & Co 46 Constitution Street, Leith (1894) now the Rocksalt Cafe
- Remodelling of the Victorian Turkish baths on Casselbank Street off Leith Walk (1894) now the Destiny Church
- Leith Academy Primary School (1896)
- Victoria Primary School, Newhaven, Edinburgh (1896)
- Tantallon Hall, North Berwick (1907)
- Strathmiglo United Free Church and church hall (1912)
- David Kilpatrick School, North Junction Street, Leith (1913) demolished
- Gymnasium block, Leith Academy (1920)
