= James Simpson (Scottish architect) =

Scottish architect

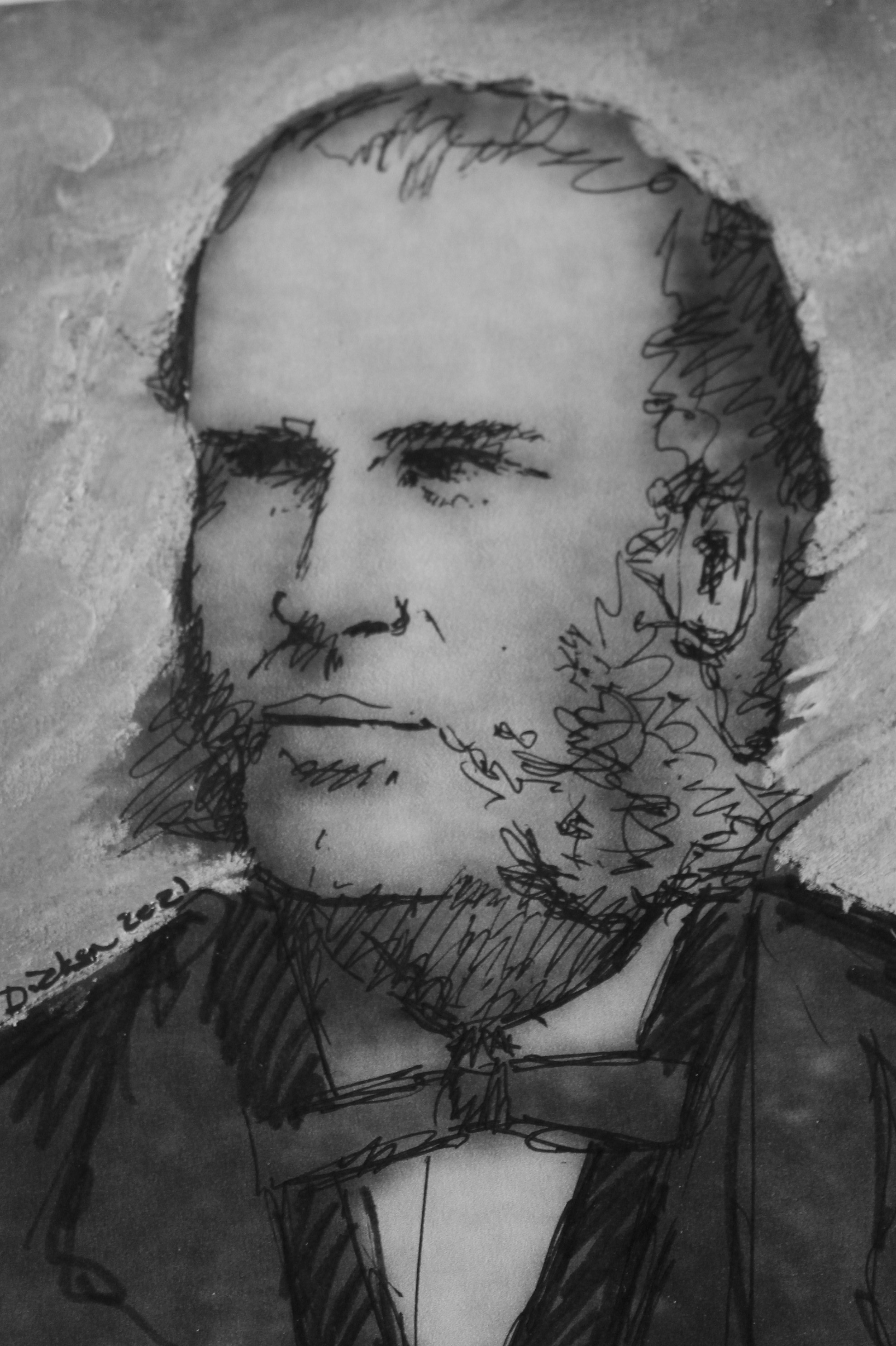
James Simpson of Leith

James Simpson (1830–1894) was a 19th century Scottish architect. He is particularly associated with Leith. He served as the Burgh Assessor and Town Architect of Leith and created and oversaw the Leith Improvement Plan of 1888.

== Life ==
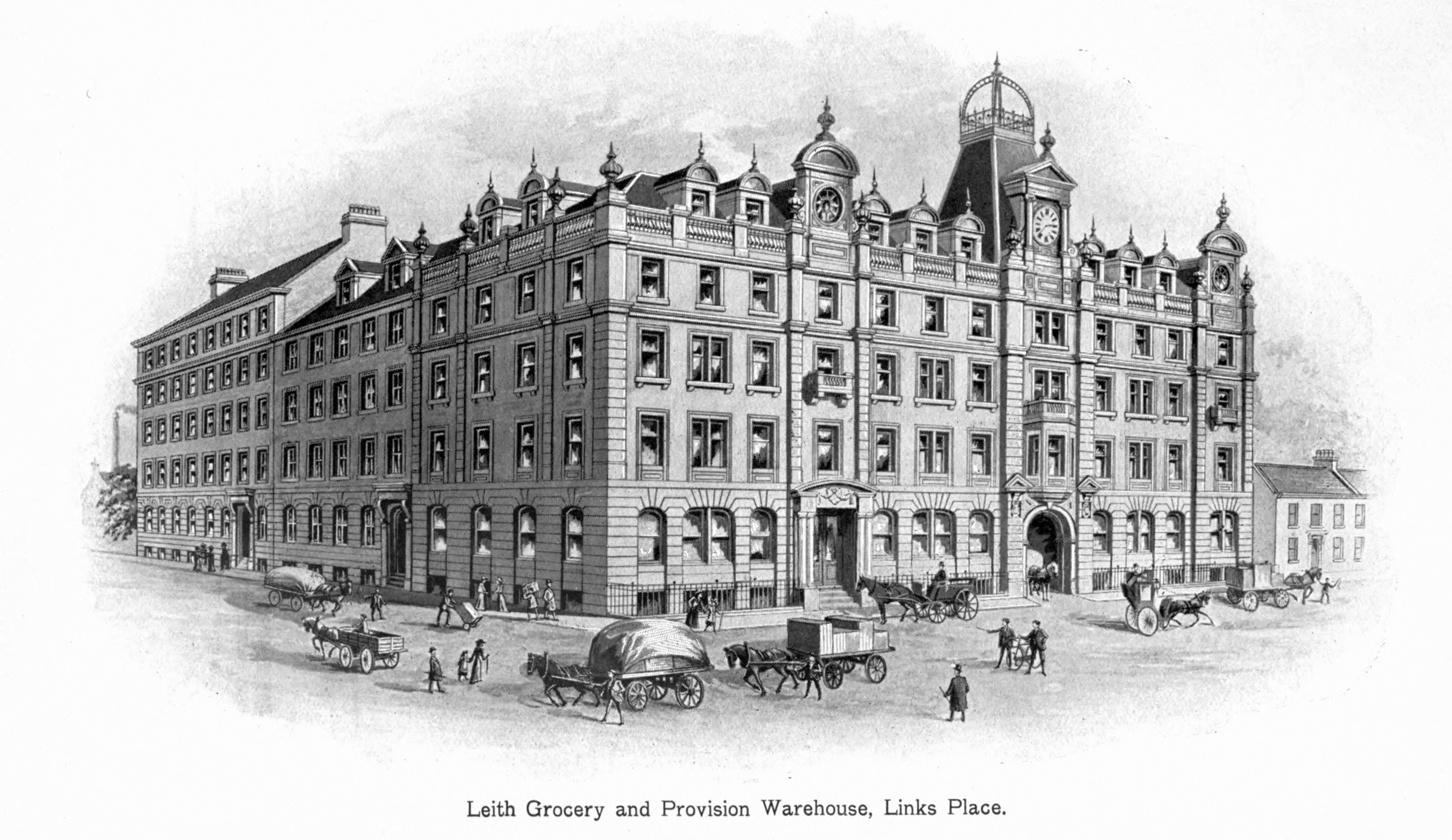
Scottish Co-operative Wholesale Society on Leith Links

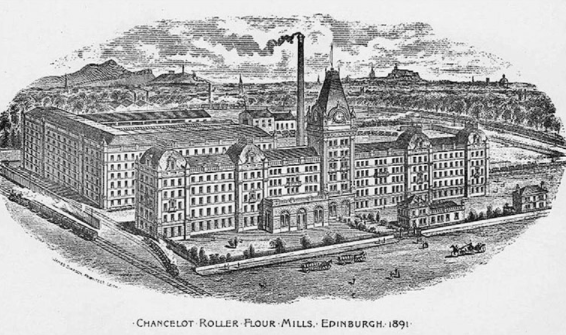
Chancelot Mills in Leith 1891

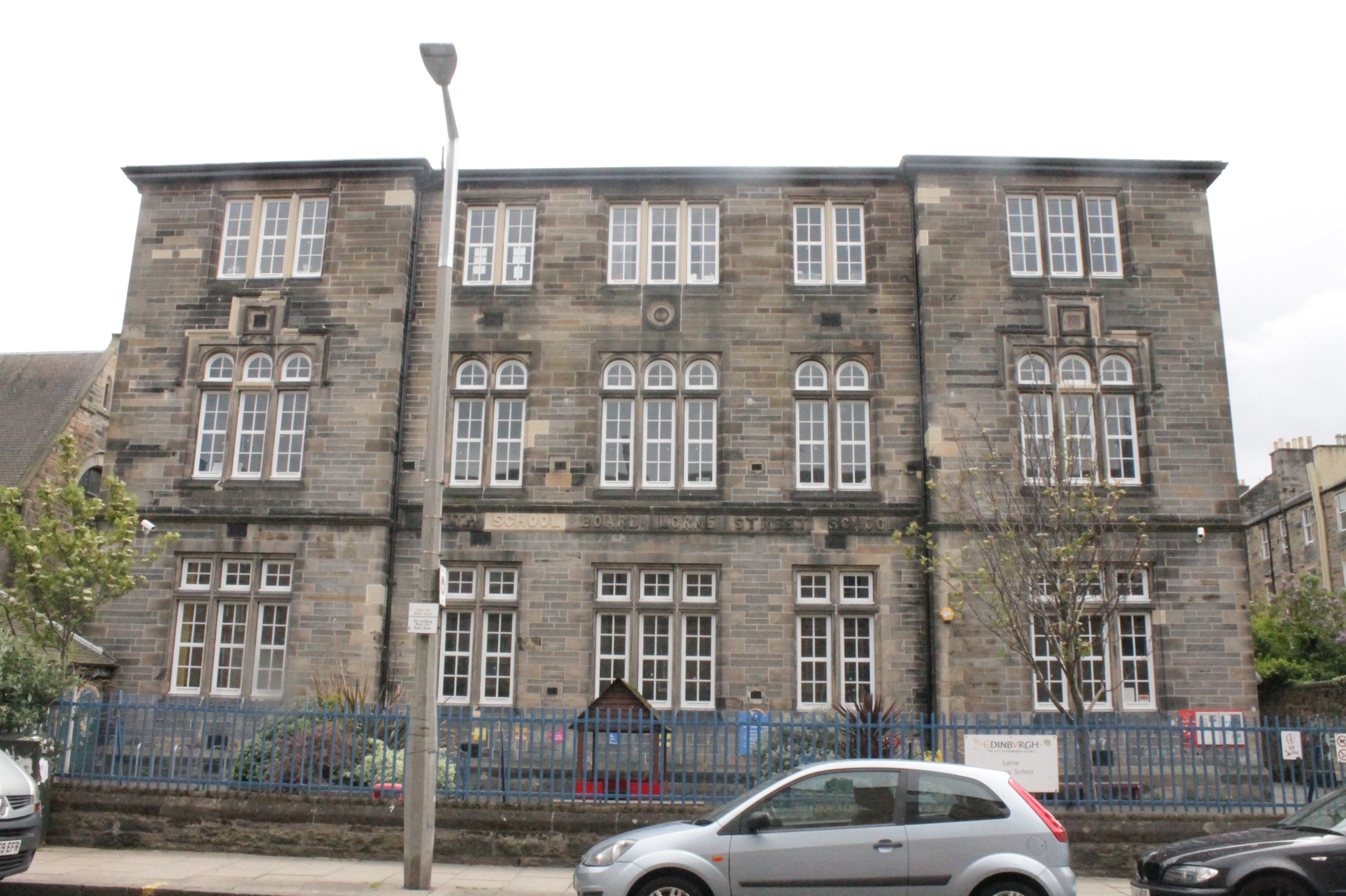
Lorne Street Primary School

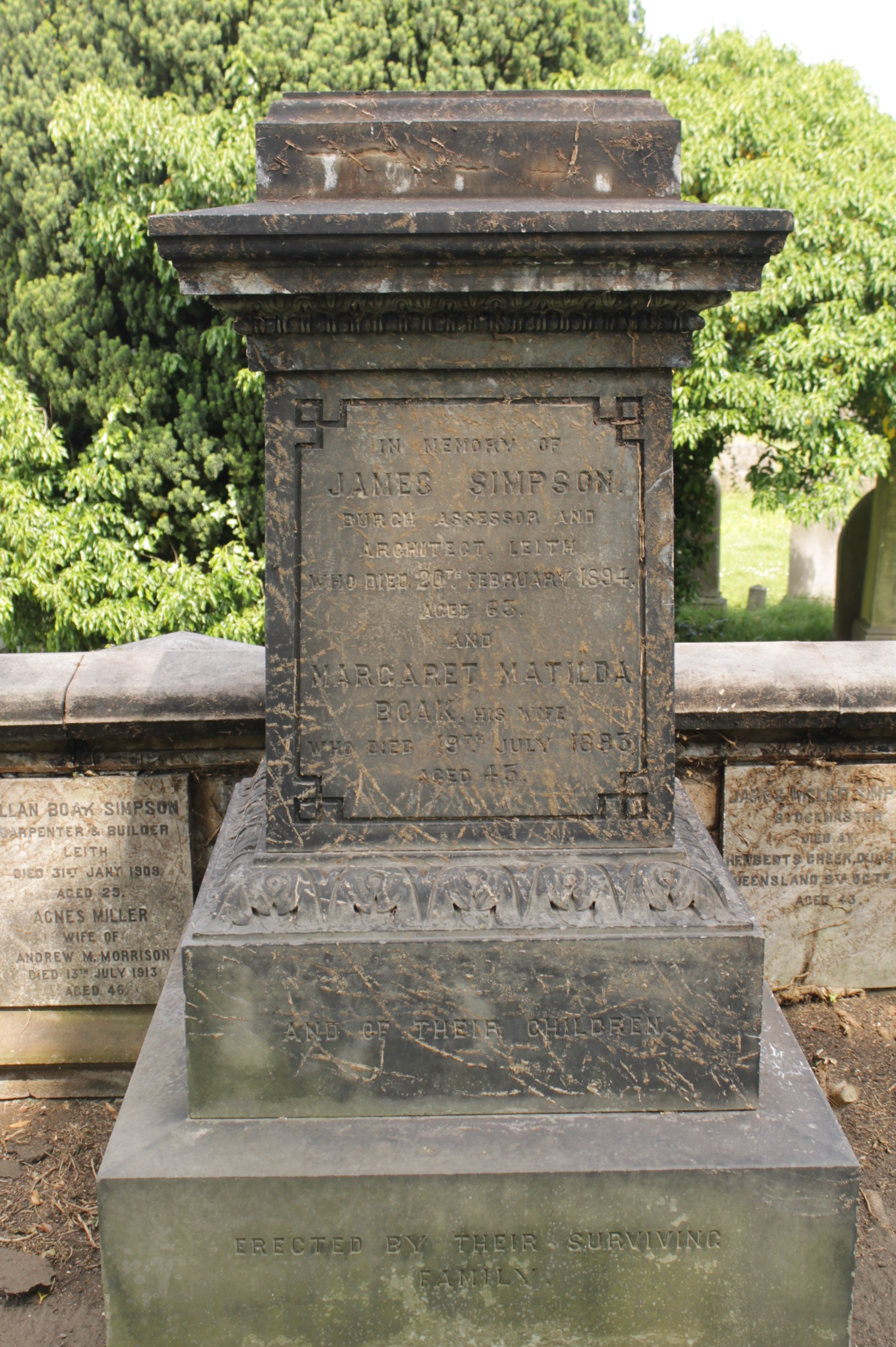
The grave of James Simpson architect, Rosebank Cemetery

He was born in Leith in 1830.

In 1867 he was living at 11 Bonnington Place off Ferry Road. George Craig trained under him.

His office was at 31 Charlotte Street (now known as Queen Charlotte Street) and his final home was Rainesfield on Ferry Road. In his role as Town Architect he devised the Leith Improvement Plan around 1870 but this was not executed until 1885 to 1888. One of the most dramatic elements was the levelling of Leith Links, leaving only two upstands: Giants Brae (a military fortification); and Lady Somerset's Brae (a large sand dune erroneously identified as a military work in the 1888 plan). The works also created Henderson Street as a link between Leith Walk/Great Junction Street and The Shore. Whilst this improved communications it swept away 700 medieval buildings and changed the historic street pattern beyond recognition. 2150 people lost their homes and the scheme cost £100,000.

The only major building surviving this clearance was The Vaults, dating from pre-1555 and then owned by the wine merchants J & G Thomson. This building was obtained by the Scotch Malt Whisky Society in 1983.

He died at home on 20 February 1894 and is buried with his wife and children in Rosebank Cemetery. The grave lies on the north edge of the raised central section. The obelisk topping his grave has been toppled.

His practice was continued by his son George Simpson (d.1944) after his death.

His masterpiece, the huge Chancelot Flour Mill was visible across most of northern Edinburgh (and from his own house). It was demolished in 1971.

== Works ==
see

- Leith Institute (1867)
- Extension to Leith Town Hall (1868) one of Britain's first facade retentions
- Scandinavian Church, North Junction St (1868) now used as Leith School of Art
- Dr Bell's School (1869)
- Union Bank Leith (1871)
- Leith Hospital King Street extension (1873)
- Bonnington Road School (1875), now Bun-sgoil Taobh na Pàirce
- Links Place School (1875)
- Lorne Primary School (1875)
- North Fort Street School (1875)
- Yardheads School (1875) now converted to flats
- Tenement at 64-70 Constitution Street (1878)
- Huge department store for Scottish Cooperative Society, Leith Links (1878)
- South Leith Parish Church Halls (1878)
- Warehouse at 42,43 Water Street (1879)
- Gladstone Place, Leith Links (1880)
- Tenement and bank 22-26 Bernard Street (1880)
- Portobello Cooperative Society (1882)
- Industrial School, 92 Restalrig Road (1885)
- Tenement and shops at 59-61 Henderson Street (1890)
- The huge and majestic Chancelot Mills, Bonnington (1891) demolished 1971
- Learmonth House, Dean, Edinburgh (1891)
- New chambers in Leith Town Hall (1891) internal
- Henderson Street tenements (1888-1891)
- Whisky bond, Water Street (1891)
- Warehouses on Maritime Street (1892/3)
- Extension to Leith Hospital (1893)
- Model Lodging House, Parliament Street (1893)

== Family ==
He married Margaret Matilda Boak, daughter of William Boak and Margaret Affleck. Almost all his family died young.

Allan's wife, Jessie Anderson Simpson, was listed as a "pauper/lunatic" from 1913 until at least 1923. She was housed at the Asylum for Female Incurables on Mill Lane.
