= Charlotte Cheverton =

British artist

Charlotte Mary Rose Cheverton
- Born: Charlotte Ramsden; 16 January 1960; Ripon, Yorkshire, England
- Died: 17 September 1991 (aged 31)
- Known for: founding an art school

Charlotte Mary Rose "Lottie" Cheverton (née Ramsden; 16 January 1960 – 17 September 1991) was a British artist. She and her husband Mark founded the Leith School of Art in 1988.

== Early life and education ==
Cheverton was born on 16 January 1960 in Ripon, Yorkshire. She was the youngest child of Juliet Ponsonby and James Ramsden MP. She was educated in London and then at Marlborough College, where she was inspired to study art by Robin Child.

At the Slade School of Art (1978–91) she received a travelling scholarship to study Christian iconography in Cappadocia, an experience which influenced her later work.

== Career ==
Cheverton taught at Fettes College and worked with community groups, in 1985 persuading artists from all over Scotland to donate pictures for display in aid of developing countries in an Art for Africa Appeal.

In 1988 she and her husband, Mark, founded the Leith School of Art to offer an environment for creativity, personal growth and intellectual awareness.

Cheverton was known in Scottish art circles for her sculptural still lives. Her works, both religious and later of fishermen and ladders of the Leith Dockyards, showed an interest in people and their lives. Both Mark and Charlotte were committed Christians and their last year of teaching was centred around the meaning of the Crucifixion.

The pamphlet Freedom within a framework: The art and teaching of Mark and Charlotte Cheverton, described an exhibition held at Leith School of Art in 1992.

== Personal life ==
She married Mark Cheverton, artist and teacher, who was appointed head of art at Edinburgh Academy.

== Death and memorial ==
Cheverton and her husband both died in a road accident on 17 September 1991.

A tapestry by Carol Marples in memory of Charlotte Cheverton is on display at St Paul's and St George's Church in Edinburgh.
