= King's Wark =

Royal arsenal near Edinburgh, Scotland

- Leith, Scotland
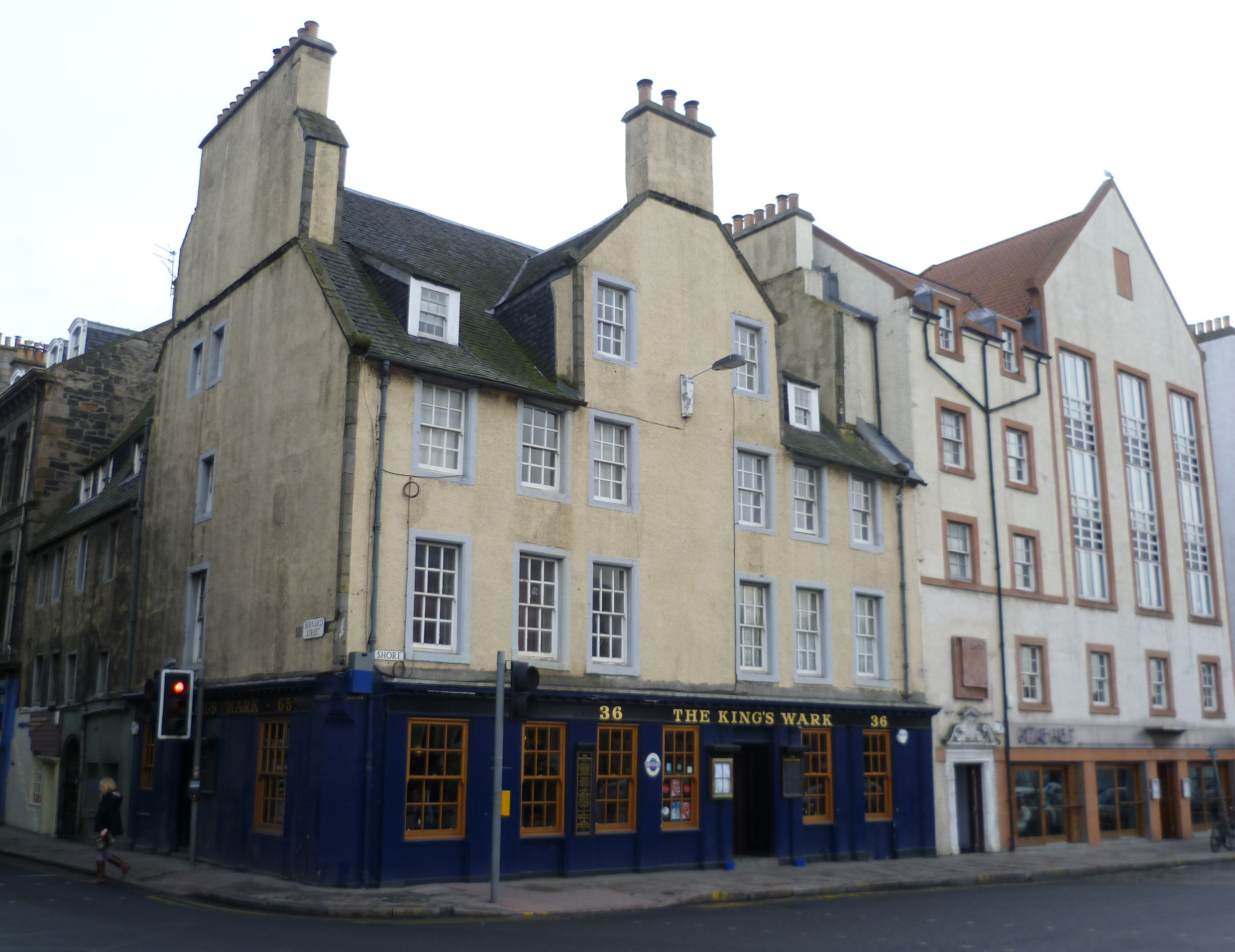
- Site of the King's Wark Royal Arsenal

Location
- Coordinates: 55.9761°N 3.1695°W

Site history
- Built: in royal occupation since 1434
- In use: disused as arsenal since 1647
- Battles/wars: destroyed May 1544

Garrison information
- Past commanders: John Chisholm (1564-1606)

The King's Wark in Leith was a building on the Shore of Leith, at the mouth of the Water of Leith into the Firth of Forth. The King's Wark was the Scottish royal arsenal where cannon used on royal ships were kept and maintained, and where supplies shipped to Leith for the royal household were stored. To the north east of the King's Wark the Shore was extended into the sea by a pier known as the "Bulwark". To the west was the Broad Wynd, and on the south, there was a walled yard. An inn on the site was documented in 1623. The site on the Shore includes a public house and restaurant called "The King's Wark" on the corner of the Shore and Bernard Street.

== History ==
The arsenal at Leith was founded by James I of Scotland in 1434, first mentioned in the Latin accounts as the Palace in Leith, "palacii de Leith", when Robert Gray, Master of Works at Edinburgh Castle began the building. Thomas Oliphant, Constable of Edinburgh Castle, was master of building works at Leith for James II of Scotland, when tiles were shipped to Leith to roof the building in June 1459. Construction continued in the 1460s, and some purchases of lead, nails, and timber were recorded in the Exchequer Rolls.

James III of Scotland founded an associated chaplain's place in the royal chapel at Restalrig in 1477, and James IV of Scotland granted rents from the King's Wark for another chaplain in 1512.

In May 1505 two boats belonging to James IV were painted at the King's Wark then hauled back into the water. Wool from the steadings and farms of James V of Scotland was stored in the "foir loft" of the King's Wark in 1537. One of the chaplains, William Turner, was compensated £10 Scots for loss of rental income when the building was used at the entries of Madeleine of Valois and Mary of Guise to Scotland.

In August 1539 cannon and other munitions captured from pirates by the royal ship the Unicorn were stored in the King's Wark. The buildings were burnt in May 1544 during the war of the Rough Wooing after 80,000 cannonballs were looted by the English army. The soldiers took a quantity of linen and canvas, and two ships, the Salamander and the Unicorn.

In 1545 Robert Logan of Restalrig used the tower as a Tolbooth for Leith. Timber cut in Aberdalgie for stocking cannon was stored in the King's Wark in 1547.

Now demolished, the tower of the King's Wark was depicted in a drawing by John Slezer in 1693.

=== Reign of Mary, Queen of Scots ===
During the reign of Mary, Queen of Scots, John Chisholm was keeper of the King's Wark. Chisholm shipped cannon and gun carriages from Leith and Dunbar north to Aberdeen and back in October 1562 during operations against the Earl of Huntly. In 1565, timber from Perthshire was shipped from the Tay to Leith and the Earl of Bothwell as Sheriff of Edinburgh was made to organise transporting the timber to Edinburgh Castle.

Chisholm arranged the firework display for the baptism of her son Prince James at Stirling Castle in December 1566. The fireworks were made in Leith and shipped to Stirling in great secrecy, carried to the castle at the dead of night "for feir of knowledge thairof." In April 1567, Parliament confirmed John Chisholm's possession of the King's Wark.

Robert Lindsay of Pitscottie identified Chisholm as the builder of the "lang stair upon Leith pier". In 1581 Chisholm was involved in making a pageant of an assault on a mock castle on the Water of Leith for the wedding of Elizabeth Stuart, 2nd Countess of Moray and James Stewart, 2nd Earl of Moray.

=== Anne of Denmark at the King's Wark ===
In October 1589, James VI decided to sail to Norway to meet his bride Anne of Denmark. John Chisholm mounted the royal artillery for the king's fleet. Accounts of expenses made by the Chancellor John Maitland of Thirlestane include the preparation of a ship, the James Royall of Ayr, hired from Robert Jameson, with a payment to Chisholm of £28 for "dressing, mounting and putting the ordinance on board."

Anne of Denmark arrived in Scotland on 1 May 1590 with James VI, and stayed five nights in the King's Wark. The path from the ship to their throne room in Chisholm's house was strewn with tapestry and Turkish carpets. The ceremony of the reception at Leith and the King's Wark had been carefully planned the previous September, when it was thought the queen's arrival was imminent. A special wooden stair was built for her to enter directly into the first-floor hall, beyond which was the queen's bedchamber. There would be chairs for Anne and James VI on this "scaffold", where they would sit in public and listen to a speech of welcome called an oration or "harangue" made by James Elphinstone in French. The directions included the order of entry, seating, and even where people should look. James and Anne would enter the bedchamber, then her Danish ladies in waiting would enter the hall, followed by the Scottish ladies and gentlemen. James would then come out of the bedchamber and greet these people, then leave. Once Anne was lodged in the King's Wark the scaffold would be taken away. The people of Leith were ordered to unload any guns and forbidden to mend ships on the Shore until she left. On the day, James Elphinstone gave his speech in Latin to the king and queen who were seated on thrones inside the hall.

=== Tenants and King's Wark sites ===
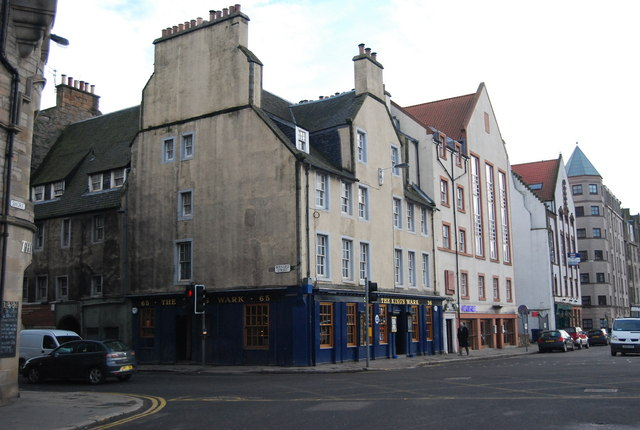
The King's Wark, showing an arched pend entry from Bernard Street

John Dalmahoy occupied a part of the Wark property and garden. In 1550 his lease included a waste unoccupied area and garden to the south of the "Kingis Werk", and between the King's Wark and the lands of John Boyman and the deceased Alexander Lyell, bounded to the west by the lane to the Shore and the sea beach on the east, and encircled with a stone wall. John Dalmahoy elder and younger had various roles in Leith, and helped at the King's Wark when building supplies and munitions were shipped to the fortress island of Inchkeith in 1561 and 1566.

In 1578 John Dalmahoy obtained the site on the bulwark or pier where the "common closets" or Burse was situated. Edinburgh town council bought the burse site from Dalmahoy. By 1598, some of the other spaces in and around the King's Wark were rented by merchants, including James Cowdane who occupied some "rowmes" within the walled area.

=== Bernard Lindsay ===
The buildings of the King's Wark passed to Bernard Lindsay of Lochhill in 1606 by Act of Parliament. Lindsay had a Leith connection, his father, Thomas Lindsay, had been the searcher-general at Leith, a customs official. His wife Barbara Logan was from a Leith family. As a courtier, chamber servant, and valet of the royal wardrobe of James VI, Bernard Lindsay had brought Henry Wotton to James VI at Dunfermline Palace in 1601, when Wotton was masquerading as an Italian "Octavio Baldi". The Leith property was to be regarded as a free barony. Lindsay was required to reserve a cellar for storing wines for the King's use. Lindsay shipped Scottish coal to supply the royal palaces in London, and in 1608 was compensated for the loss of two coal barques or hoys in a storm.

Lord Walden visited in August 1612 to refresh himself after crossing from Burntisland before continuing to John Killoch's house in the Canongate. In 1612 Lindsay planned a stone arched open arcade facing the shore with seating for merchants to be the burse or exchange of Leith. The king granted him a tax on wine imports for the building work. Lindsay built a "fyne gallerye ... reised upoun arches and pilleris of friestone" and paved underneath with "hewne stone". The description of the planned arches resembles the surviving facade of Gladstone's Land on the Royal Mile.

Lindsay had completed some rebuilding by the time of the visit of James VI and I to Scotland in 1617, and added a tennis court. A 1623 charter names the court in Latin as a spheristerio, and in the Scots language, a caitchpell. The charter mentions that Lindsay had built a gallery on the Shore, and details some spaces of the older buildings. A mural latrine in the old tower was still in use. Lindsay's brother, Master Robert Lindsay, had occupied the hall of the King's Wark, two rooms above the hall (presumably the lodgings appointed for Anne of Denmark in 1589), two cellars below the hall, and the kitchen, the back "out-set" wing and cellar, and the old tower which had three stories above its basement. There was an entrance way or pend under the wing at the back. An inn or tavern in the complex was described in Latin as a caupona.

The charter evidence for the tavern at the King's Wark and the separate mention of a wine cellar reserved for the king confused 19th-century antiquarian writers, who debated whether a courtier might be an inn keeper. A tavern was also included in the prestigious Gladstone's Land tenement in this period, managed by Isobel Johnston for the owners.

In preparation for James's "salmonlike" return to Scotland in 1617, cannon wheels and stocks were kept at the Wark, and in 1623 the Master of Work, James Murray of Kilbaberton stored cannon and shot from a Dunkirk ship in Bernard Lindsay's Close.

In 1626 Charles I asked the depute treasurer of Scotland to buy the "King's Houses" from Bernard Lindsay for use as a Customs House. This was not accomplished. In 1632, Lindsay's widow, Barbara Logan, and her son Robert Lindsay transferred the site and tower and other properties to Patrick Murray of Elibank.

In 1647 the site was acquired by Edinburgh burgh council from William Dick of Braid, for £4,500 Scots. It is thought that Bernard Street takes its name from Bernard Lindsay, and for a time the vicinity was known as "Bernard's Nook".
