= The Shore, Leith =

Street in Leith, Edinburgh, Scotland

The Shore
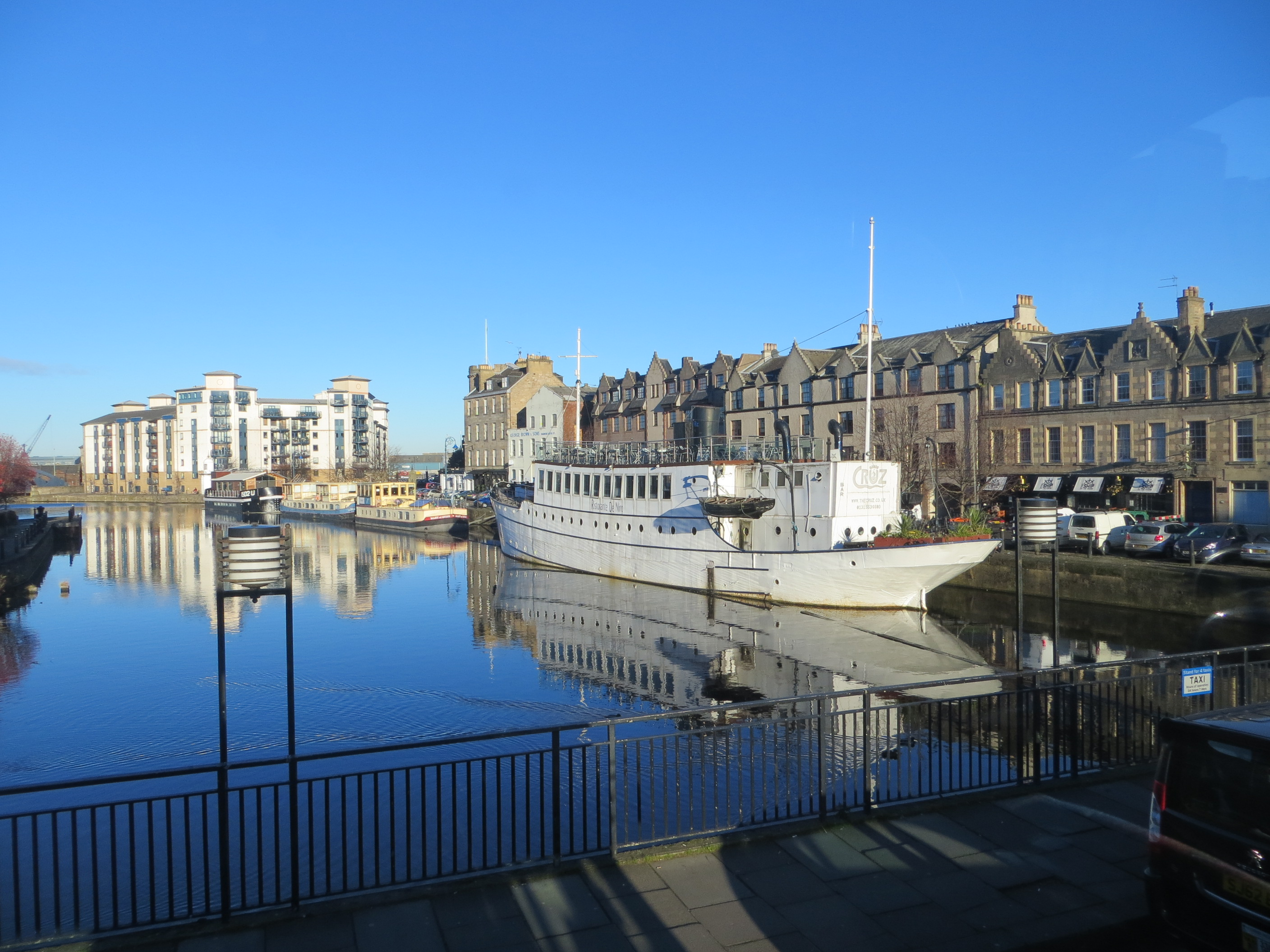
- The Shore, Leith – site of the mutineers' massacre

- Location within Edinburgh
- Maintained by: City of Edinburgh Council
- Location: Leith, Edinburgh, United Kingdom
- Postal code: EH6
- Nearest Tram station: The Shore
- Coordinates: 55.9766°N 3.1695°W
- North end: Tower Place
- South end: Henderson Street

Other
- Known for: King George IV landing (1822); Historic harbour, restaurants & cafes

The Shore is a historic and picturesque street in the centre of Old Leith, the harbour area of Edinburgh.

It edges the final section of the Water of Leith before it flows through Leith Docks into the Firth of Forth.

== History ==
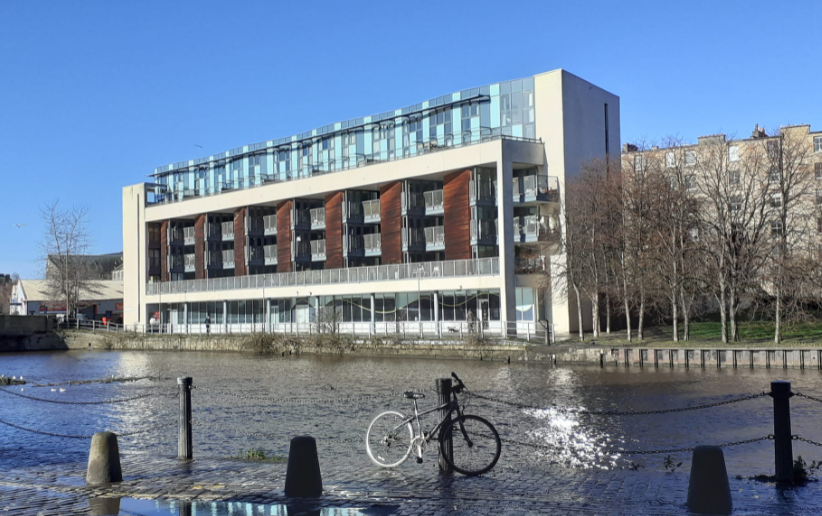
Ronaldson's Wharf facing Shore in Leith

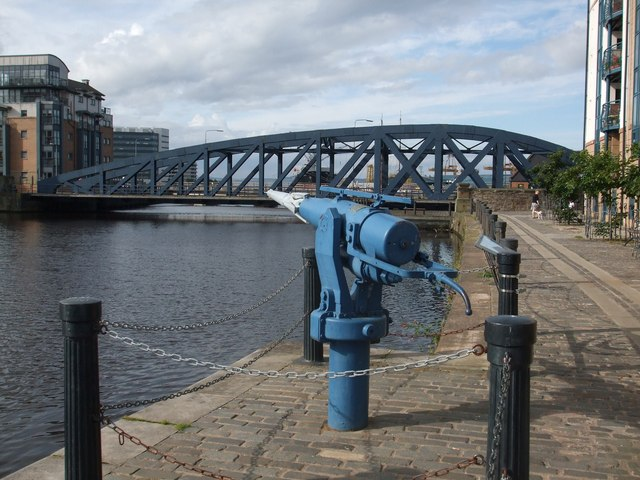
Harpoon Gun north end of the Shore

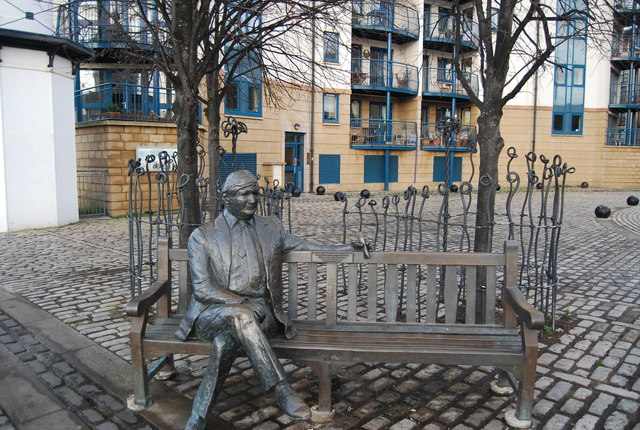
Statue of Sandy Irvine Robertson

The site had been a harbour since Anglo-Saxon times.

Due to its location it was the arrival point of several monarchs on historic visits to the city: Mary, Queen of Scots (1561) before her Entry to Edinburgh; Anne of Denmark (1590) who stayed at the King's Wark before her coronation; Charles II (1651); George IV (1822). Queen Victoria's visit of 1842 disembarked in Leith Docks rather than the Shore.

In May 1544, during the war known as the Rough Wooing, an English army arrived in Leith intending to burn Edinburgh. On Monday 5 May, English ships unloaded heavy artillery on the quayside at The Shore, to be used against Edinburgh's gates and Edinburgh Castle.

=== Sting and ling ===
Workmen called "pioneers" carried barrels of salt to a ship at the "schoir of Leith" in 1564. In November 1583, the burgh council of Edinburgh met at the Shore to discuss the roles and wages of porters called "stingmen and polkmen". The stingmen worked in pairs carrying loads suspended from a pole on their shoulders known as a "sting" and the polk men carried sacks or bags called "polks". The cords used with the stings were called lines, and the method was known as "sting and ling". In 1564, barrels of wine were carried "upone sting and ling" from Leith to a meeting of the Scottish exchequer.

=== Eighteenth century ===
In April 1779 there was an unfortunate incident on the northern half of the Shore, with many lives lost. 70 Highlanders belonging to the 42nd and 71st Regiments were in position to board a ship but refused as it was rumoured they were to be transferred to a lowland regiment and would lose the right to wear a kilt. This was untrue, but even if true it seems a trivial start to what then ensued. Under order from James Oughton, 200 soldiers of the South Fencibles were sent out from Edinburgh Castle to quell the mutiny under command of Major Sir James Johnstone. The Highlanders refused to either surrender or lay down their muskets (which were fitted with bayonets). Both sides being heavily armed the tension quickly turned to bloodshed. One Highlander trying to run off was grabbed by a Sergeant of the Fencibles who was then bayonetted to make him loose his grasp. A second sergeant armed with a pike, was then shot by a Highlander. The Fencibles raised their muskets and fired into the group of Highlanders killing 12 men and mortally wounding many. The Highlanders having far less ammunition returned fire to less effect: two Fencibles killed and one injured. Captain James Mansfield, attempting to attend the latter, was cruelly bayonetted by a mutineer who in turn was shot in the head by a corporal. The Fencibles moved in with fixed bayonets and captured the 25 survivors who were then imprisoned in the castle. The total lives lost appears to be somewhere between 40 and 50. Mansfield was buried in Greyfriars Churchyard. The other Fencibles were buried in the open ground at the foot of Canongate Churchyard (which was reserved for deaths connected to Edinburgh Castle. The 40 Highlanders killed or dying of wounds were buried in South Leith Parish Churchyard. After a court martial, three further Highlanders were within seconds of being executed by firing squad: Williamson and MacIvor of the 42nd and Budge of the 71st. However a pardon was received from the Queen due to the valour of their regiment.

The Shore was the first place in Leith to install public street lighting: oil lamps in 1771 (to combat a number of people falling in the river in the dark. It was also the first street in Edinburgh to have electric street lights (1895) served by a local generating station.

=== Twentieth century ===
Up until 1969 the water was tidal, but due to lock constructions in the outer edge of Leith Docks water is now permanently 1m higher than the old high tide level. For around a decade the outer lock was kept fully open once a year at low tide to allow silt in the river bed to flush out, but this routine halted when the inner harbour ceased to be navigable.

The Town Council plan for Leith (part of Edinburgh's Abercrombie Plan) from the early 1950s envisaged the entire demolition of the Shore and redevelopment as industrial sheds. This was adapted to allow (and encourage) modern housing schemes and the demolitions and redevelopments crept towards the Shore in the 60s and 70s. Meanwhile, The Shore was left to rot. The final wave of scheduled demolition removed the buildings on the north side of Tolbooth Wynd. The northward progression then ceased, leaving the Shore in a limbo. By 1980 there were only two inhabited buildings, discounting the several ground floor bars which still managed to turn a profit. As part of its maritime background the area was also hindered by its use as a red light area.

The secondary hindrance was a huge Health and Safety exclusion zone centred on Leith Docks, which prohibited new residential development due to the explosive value of fertilisers housed in Scottish Agricultural Industries for a radius of 1 km. This restriction was abandoned in 1983 eight years before SAI physically abandoned their dock site.

This all began to turn around in the 1980s when a fashion for restoration, combined by very low property values in Leith, allowed a number of small property developers to risk some restoration schemes. This was hampered severely in that Leith (EH6) was blacklisted for mortgages. The first mortgage was given by the Alliance and Leicester Building Society in 1984, in relation to the Cooperage. Coupled with the housing revival the Shore and its environs became a magnet to restaurants and the new concept of gastro pubs. In current times, Leith has three Michelin star restaurants: The Kitchin (Tom Kitchin), Martin Wishart and Heron.

The widespread recession of the late 1980s brought development to a halt but it restarted in 1993 and from that point began a meteoric rise... going from one of the least desirable parts of the city to one of the most desirable. Rightly or wrongly it is perceived as a new yuppie stronghold despite the majority of new housing projects being for Port of Leith Housing Association.

== Transport ==
=== Buses ===
Lothian Buses service 16, 35 and 36 all stop on The Shore.

=== Tram ===
The Shore tram stop opened to passengers in June 2023. It is located 200 metres east along Bernard Street at the northern junction of Constitution Street.

Preceding station	Edinburgh Trams	Following station
Port of Leith towards Newhaven	Newhaven – Edinburgh Airport	Foot of the Walk towards Airport

The north end of The Shore is also in close proximity to the Port of Leith tramstop, via Tower Place.

== Buildings/Structures of Note ==
see

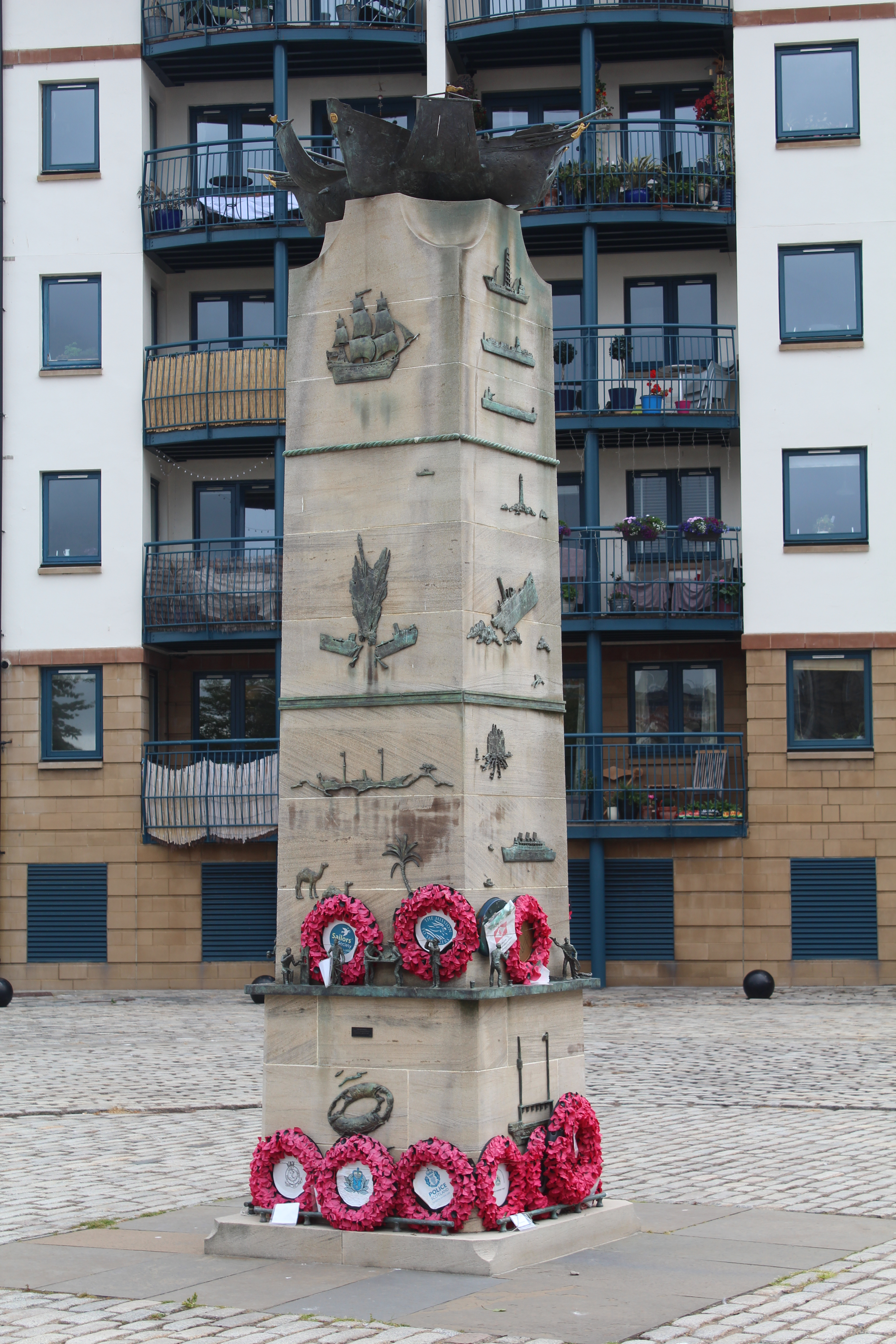
Monument to the Merchant Navy, Leith

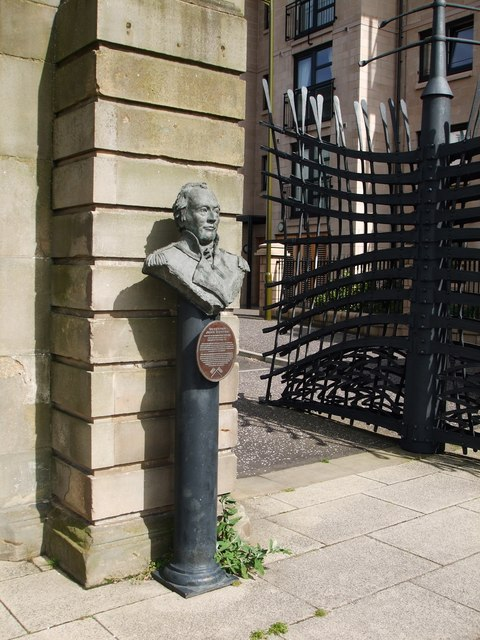
Bust of Admiral John Hunter

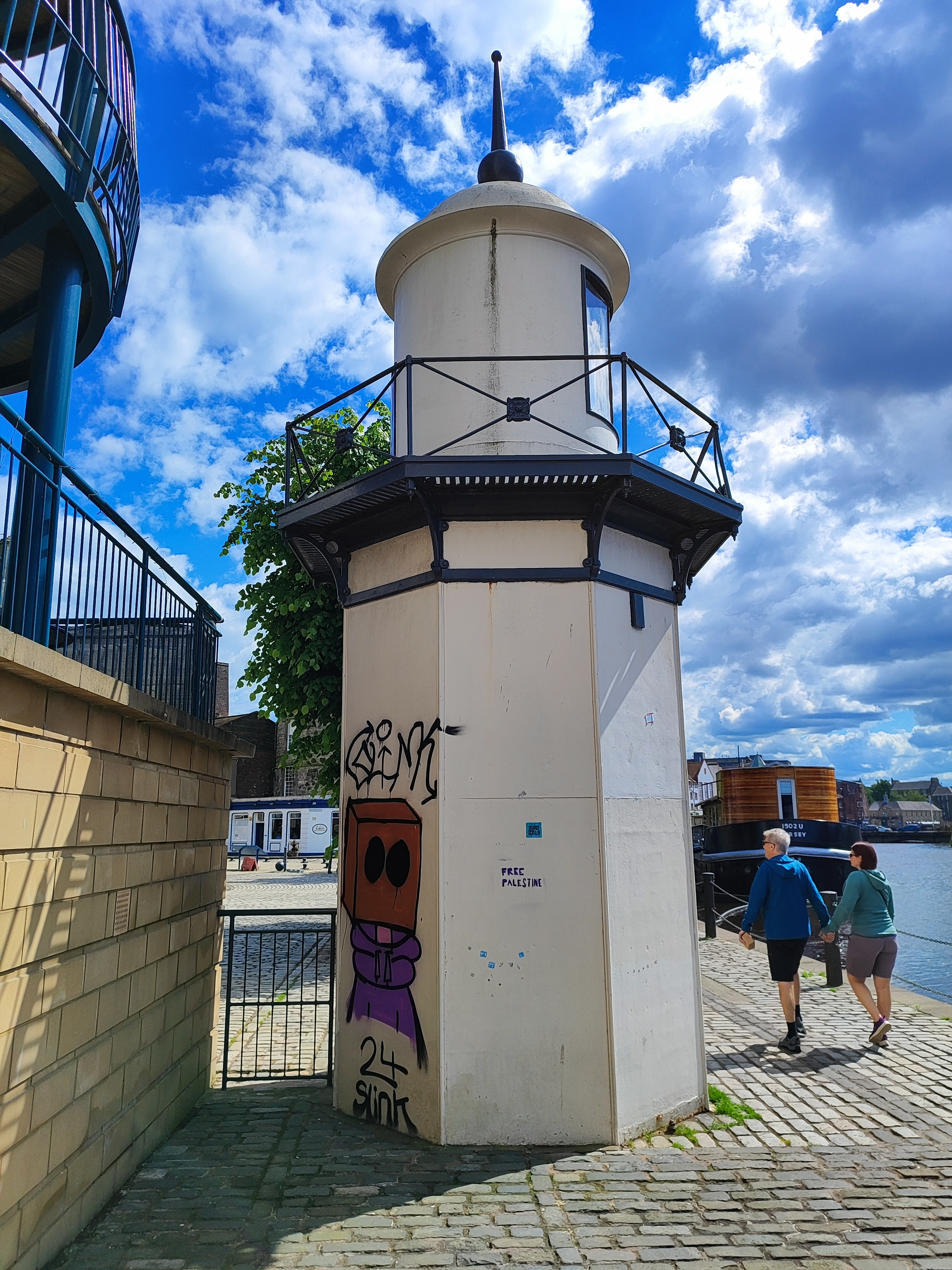
Lighthouse on the Shore

- Lamb's House – just off the Shore, a rare merchant's house of 1630 restored 2012
- Signal Tower – originally built as a windmill atop a four-storey stepped stone base in 1685, converted to a signal tower in the Napoleonic Wars
- 20 Shore – preserved doorway from 1678
- The King's Wark – rebuilt in 1705 and restored 1972 as Housing Association flats over pub
- Preserved Door south of Kings Wark – 1711
- Malt & Hops public house – 1745 one of the oldest public houses in Scotland (but somewhat altered)
- The Cooperage – built as a warehouse around 1760, the first warehouse conversion in Leith
- The metal edge on the west side (next to the Cooperage) marks Scotland's first dry dock 1771
- Sandport Bridge – 1780 with central section built in 1950 to replace the rising drawbridge
- A large circular iron cover on the face of the eastern stone river edge marks where Scotland's first sewer (1785) on Bernard Street, flowed into the river.
- Customs House – 1812
- Old Ship Inn – 1860s with 17th c carved stone plus a model ship (John Boy) on frontage (Over "The Ship" puplic house)
- Malmaison Hotel – built as a Seamen's Hostel "The Angel" 1883
- Statue of Sandy Irvine Robertson on a bench – north end 1995
- Faux lighthouse (north end) – 1995 made from salvaged sections of a larger lighthouse from Burntisland
- Modern harpoon (north end just beyond the dividing wall) – 1950s harpoon donated in 1996 when Christian Salvesen moved their HQ out of Leith
- Rostral column monument to the Merchant Navy Seamen – north end 2010
- Ronaldsons Wharf – voted best brownfield redevelopment of 2004
- New pivoting dock gates – installed to accommodate crowds at the Tall Ships Race in 1995

== Lost features ==
- Ramage & Ferguson shipyard stood to the north-west – closed 1935 last remnants demolished 1985
- The Adam fireplace company brought in their marbles and timber here and had their masons yard on Bernard Street – closed 1820
- Catchpell House, the first Royal Tennis court in Edinburgh (destroyed 1695)
- The several groups of listed warehouses on Timber Bush were destroyed in an arson attack in 1983.
- The group of listed buildings close to Broad Wynd were demolished around 1975
- Robert Adam's only tenement, which stood at the west end of Sandport Street, was demolished in 1978 to create a car park
- Mary of Guise's house (c. 1530) stood on Queen St until 1849 – now called Shore Place
- Leith's first Episcopal chapel (housed in a building dated 1516) stood on Queen Street (Shore Place) just north of Mary of Guise's house. In 1865 this was converted into a temperance hall

== Memorials ==
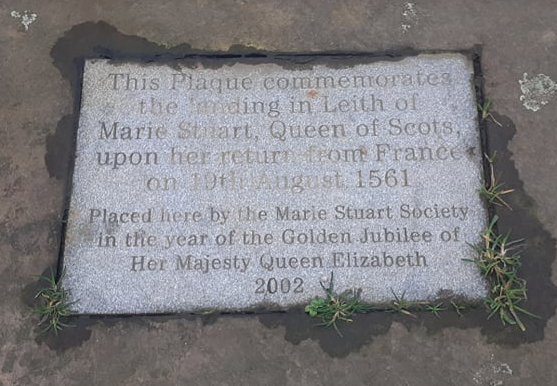
Plaque marking the landing point of Mary Queen of Scots, the Shore, Leith

- Plaque to the landing point of Mary, Queen of Scots (set into stone on river edge opposite the Kings Wark)
- Bust of Vice Admiral John Hunter governor of Australia at dock gates – gifted by Australia in 1996
- A rather subtle 6m long inlay of metal in the cobbles at the south end of the Shore represents the course of the Water of Leith
