= John Chisholm (soldier) =

Scottish soldier

John Chisholm was a 16th-century Scottish soldier and the chief officer, Comptroller and Prefect of the Scottish artillery for Mary, Queen of Scots and James VI of Scotland. He was also keeper of the King's Wark in Leith. Chisholm was a supporter of Mary, Queen of Scots in the years after her exile in England.

== Career ==
=== Mary's artillery ===
In November 1561 John Chisholm, as comptroller clerk of the royal artillery, provided six culverins for Dunbar Castle. Chisholm shipped cannon and gun carriages from Leith and Dunbar north to Aberdeen and back in October 1562 during operations against the Earl of Huntly.

Mary, Queen of Scots was eager for Chisholm's arrival as a messenger in Perth in April 1564. As Comptroller of the Royal Artillery in 1565, he received the large sum of 10,000 merks on her behalf from the town council of Edinburgh, for the right of superiority of Edinburgh over Leith. The money was used to take the royal artillery to the west of Scotland during the rebellion called the Chaseabout Raid.

=== Timber for the royal artillery ===
In 1565 Mary Queen of Scots and Lord Darnley reviewed the state of the royal artillery. In November the Treasurer of Scotland was ordered to supply oak for various needs, and iron, and lead for bullets. The Treasurer was also to pay any outstanding gunner's wages. John Chisholm was to oversee the restoration of the guns. Chisholm was given £1000 Scots for other supplies. Mary wrote letters to the owners of woodlands for new timber to replace the worn-out and rotten mounts. Timber was cut at Kincardine, Aberuthven, Aberdalgie and Moncreiffe Hill and taken to the mouth of the Water of Earn. In April 1566 Chisholm was ordered to liaise with the Earl of Montrose and Lord Drummond to transport the timber to Edinburgh. The timber was shipped from the Tay to Leith and the Earl of Bothwell as Sheriff of Edinburgh was made to organise transporting the timber to Edinburgh Castle.

=== Mary's fireworks ===
John Chisholm arranged the firework display for the baptism of her son Prince James at Stirling Castle in December 1566. The preparations were expensive, and John had to send to the Queen twice for extra money. John's account for the event lists his ingredients, including, colophony, orpiment, quicksilver, arrows and dozens of small pottery vessels. The fireworks were made in Leith and shipped to Stirling in great secrecy, carried to the castle at the dead of night "for feir of knowledge thairof." John also arranged the making of costumes used in a pageant of an assault on a mock castle.

In April 1567 Mary, Queen of Scots confirmed in Parliament John Chisholm's possession of the King's Wark at the Shore of Leith. which he had held in feu since May 1564. There, John was in charge of the long established arsenal which served the Royal Scots Navy.

=== Adversity and the Marian Civil War ===
In September 1567 Chisholm brought cannon from Edinburgh Castle to besiege Dunbar Castle which was held by the retainers of the Earl of Bothwell. He also dismounted cannons on Inchkeith island and brought them to Leith, and then to Edinburgh Castle. He transported artillery to Glasgow for use at the battle of Langside.

He was appointed Prefect and "Second Person" of the royal artillery of Scotland (S. D. N. Regis Machinarii Bellitarii Prefecti) on 23 August 1569, during the Regency of the James Stewart, Earl of Moray. In 1570, Chisholm joined William Kirkcaldy of Grange in the garrison of Edinburgh Castle that remained loyal to Mary, Queen of Scots. During the following 'Lang Siege' of the Castle and Marian civil war, Chisholm travelled abroad seeking support and supplies. In February 1571 he was in London and wrote about ongoing peace negotiations, hoping that Elizabeth I of England would act to restore Mary to the Scottish throne. He hoped that the frustrating talks would be concluded soon; "I hoip seurlie within sax ouilkis (six weeks), we salbe at our wittis end and sooner".

Chisholm visited Mary at Sheffield Castle, and took letters to France in April, borrowing £3 from John Lesley, Bishop of Ross. The Bishop kept a note of Chisholm's movements; he returned to Scotland from Dieppe in June 1571, carrying money sent by the exiled Bishop of Glasgow, cannonballs of four different calibres and pikes. These supplies were obtained from Charles IX of France. Chisholm and his ship were captured at North Queensferry in July by Patrick, Lord Lindsay, but he managed to pass some of the money to Mary's supporters. It was thought he had intended to take Tantallon Castle, linking up with Mary's supporters who unsuccessfully attacked the castle on 2 July 1571.

Chisholm was allowed to return to France and joined the Bishop of Glasgow. In March 1573 William Maitland of Lethington thought his adversaries had discovered the key to the cipher code he used in his letters when James Kirkcaldy was captured. He used John Chisholm's code in a letter to the Bishop. Agents of the English Secretary of State, William Cecil, intercepted and easily decoded this letter. John wrote to Mary, Queen of Scots from Paris in August 1575. He asked that he might come to England and serve in her household with his wife, and concluded his letter with his hopes of Mary's "suddane" delivery from her troubles.

=== Rehabilitation ===
After this period of exile, in July 1576 Chisholm gained an official pardon for his support of Mary and Grange and unauthorized travel abroad. On 31 May 1579 he was re-appointed as "Comptroller and Second Person of the Artillery and Munition within all parts of Scotland." The gift of the King's Wark, the Opus Regium, was confirmed in May 1588, giving his title as; Compotorus Rotulatori Tormentorum Bellicorum – Controller of the accounting rolls for war machines.

The French Ambassador Bertrand de Salignac de la Mothe-Fénelon noted that Chisholm was still active as a supporter of Mary in February 1583, and Chisholm asked that Mary should continue paying him a pension. In May 1583 the English diplomat Robert Bowes reported him as a "notorious instrument" for Maineville, the agent of Esmé Stewart, 1st Duke of Lennox who was expelled from Scotland by the Gowrie Regime.

Robert Lindsay of Pitscottie identifies Chisholm as the builder of the "lang stair upon Leith pier".
