= Timber Bush =

Suburb of Leith, Scotland

Coordinates: 55°58′38″N 3°10′08″W

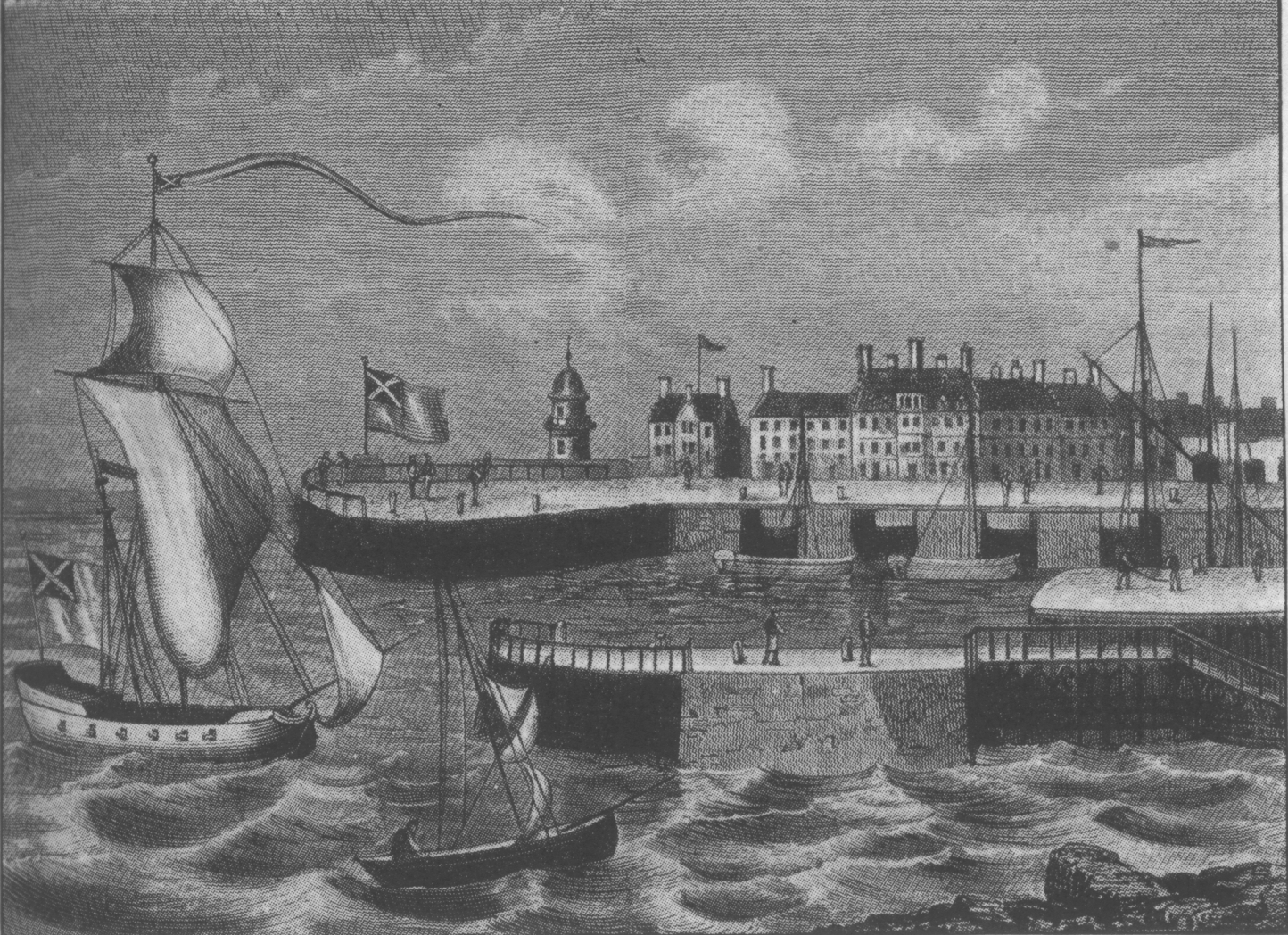
Leith Harbour extension c.1685 by Robert Mylne. Note the apertures in the harbour wall which allowed logs to be floated into Timber Bush.

Timber Bush is an area of Leith, the port town of Edinburgh, Scotland, north of Bernard Street. "Bush" derives from the French "Bourse" and the name means timber market; this formerly being an open area where timber was offloaded from ships before sale.

== History ==
James VI granted a charter to Bernard Lindsay, after whom the nearby Bernard Street is named, allowing him to build a piazza looking on to the harbour, with stone arches and pillars "to be the ordinary Burse and walking place for merchants, natural & stranger." Later the whole ground was used as a timber market.

The export of whisky from, and the import of wine into Leith, gave it a large trade in coopering. In his Bride of Lammermoor, Sir Walter Scott speaks of "Peter Puncheon that was cooper to the queen's stores at the Timmer Burse (that is, Timber Bush) at Leith." The majority of bonded warehouses and stores on Timber Bush were burned down on a single night in 1982. The four remaining warehouses on the south side were not all bonds. Reading from left to right they held in turn; leather goods; peanuts and raisins; claret (only latterly being used for whisky); and lastly slates. These stand on the vaulted basement of an earlier huge warehouse (demolished 1830) which may have been the Queen's Stores referred to by Scott. All of the warehouses are now converted to other uses.

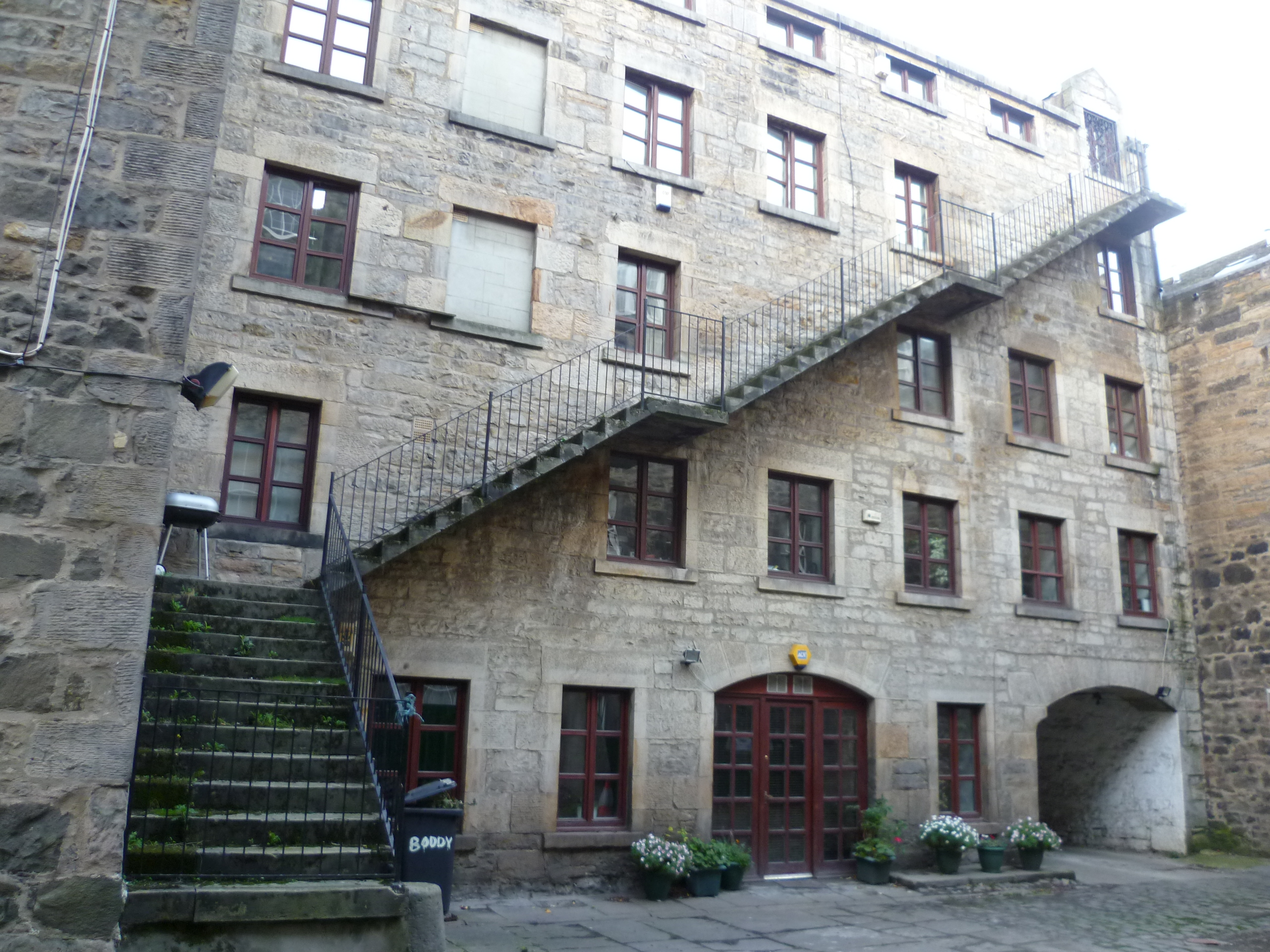
A converted warehouse in Timber Bush, 2011

The central pair of warehouses appear as a single designed frontage, but other than the frontage are of completely different forms (quickly seen from the other side or in an aerial view). The odd 300mm gap between the westmost unit and the next building is explained by the need to maintain daylight to the inner building (bonds could not have open flames for lighting so before electricity had to be fully daylit). The windows line up between the two buildings and residents from one can reach into the other if the windows are open.

== Present day ==
Timber Bush is now an enclave behind the busy traffic of Bernard Street, and home to modern flats, marketing firms, small media companies and a letting agent.
