= Leith Banking Company =

The Leith Banking Company (also referred to as the Leith Bank) was a bank based in the town of Leith (now part of Edinburgh), Scotland, which opened in 1793 and was forced to merge due to debt in 1842. The bank was established by 18 partners, mainly merchants, on 1 January 1793. Partners James Ker and Henry Johnston were joint managers. Sir Walter Scott is believed to have been an account holder.

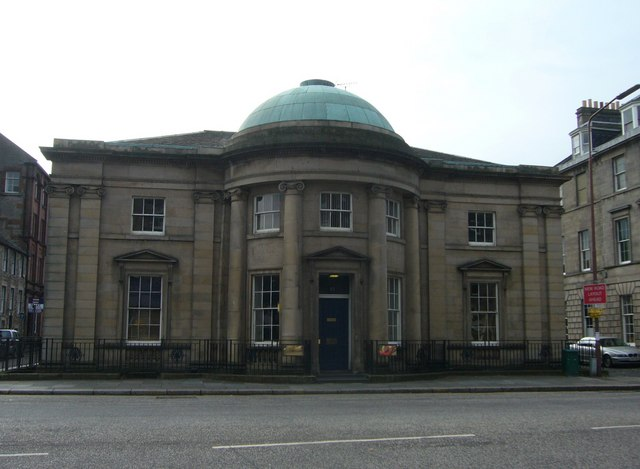
The former headquarters of the Leith Banking Company

The headquarters of Leith Bank for the larger part of its existence was a two-storey building on Bernard Street, Leith, built in 1805–06. The bank grew during a time of prosperity for Leith during the early 19th century, following the development of the town's pier, harbour, docks and warehousing facilities. By 1827, it was one of five banking businesses operating in the town, the others being the Commercial Bank, the National Bank, the British Linen Bank and the Bank of Scotland.

Beyond Leith, the bank also had branches in Callander, Dalkeith, Galashiels, Langholm and Carlisle, did business in Glasgow via an agent and operated from tents at sundry agricultural markets and fairs. Its agents in London were Barnett & Co. The office in Carlisle was, in fact, registered as an English bank and was therefore illegal, since English law forbade banks to have more than 6 partners. No attempts were made to prosecute the point though, until the branch closed of its own accord in 1837.

Apart from a period in 1797 when it had to suspend cash payments, the bank initially prospered. However, with the economic crisis of 1837, the bank began to struggle. The following year, the Glasgow Union Bank offered them 5% on every £100,000 of deposits transferred, terms which they declined. In 1842, with debts totalling £123,582, including £10,000 of notes in circulation, the Leith Banking Company failed. It was merged with another bank to become the Edinburgh and Leith Banking Company. This in turn was merged into the Clydesdale Bank. The bank's headquarters were taken over by the National Bank.

== Bibliography ==
- Campbell, Alex (1827). The History of Leith, from the Earliest Accounts to the Present Period. Leith: William Reid & Son. "The History of Leith, from the Earliest Accounts to the Present Period."
- Douglas, James, Leith Banking Company Notes, St Albans n/d 18pp privately published bound typescript
- Gilbart, James William (1827). A practical treatise on banking: containing an account of the London and country banks. London: E. Wilson. p. 58.
- Russell, John (1922). The Story of Leith. Thomas Nelson & Sons Ltd.
