= Leith School of Art =

Art school in Leith, Edinburgh, Scotland

Coordinates: 55°58′33″N 3°10′46″W

- Sgoil-ealain Lìte
- Type: Art school
- Established: 1988
- Principal: Nicholas Devison
- Total staff: ~40
- Location: Leith, Edinburgh, Scotland
- Campus: North Junction Street, Leith & Albion Road, Leith
- Website: Leith School of Art

Leith School of Art (LSA) is an independent art college in Leith, Edinburgh, Scotland, providing tertiary education in art and design. LSA is located in the Leith area of Edinburgh, in the converted former Norwegian Seamen's Church, originally built by Scottish architect James Simpson and Danish architect Johan Schroder in 1868.

LSA was founded by Mark and Charlotte Cheverton, in 1988 or 1989 with the aim " ... to create a school with a vital artistic life emphasising both tradition and innovation, to produce work of distinctive quality and character." The couple died three years later in a car crash, and there was uncertainty whether the school would continue.

The school has Scottish Qualification Authority accreditation, and often acts as a feeder to university courses and other art colleges.

== Campus ==
LSA has always been based in the former Norwegian Seamen's Church in on North Junction Street in Leith to the north of Edinburgh's New Town. Studios are set out on three levels in the main church building, with additional studio and lecture space in the former church hall at the rear of the main building.

In 1999 a modern extension was built around three sides of the former church, adding further studio space, a small library and entrance hall.

In 2022, LSA gained an additional campus at 66 Albion Road in a former Victorian print works.

== See also ==
- List of further and higher education colleges in Scotland
