= Constitution Street =

Thoroughfare in Leith, Edinburgh

Coordinates: 55°58′23″N 3°10′06″W

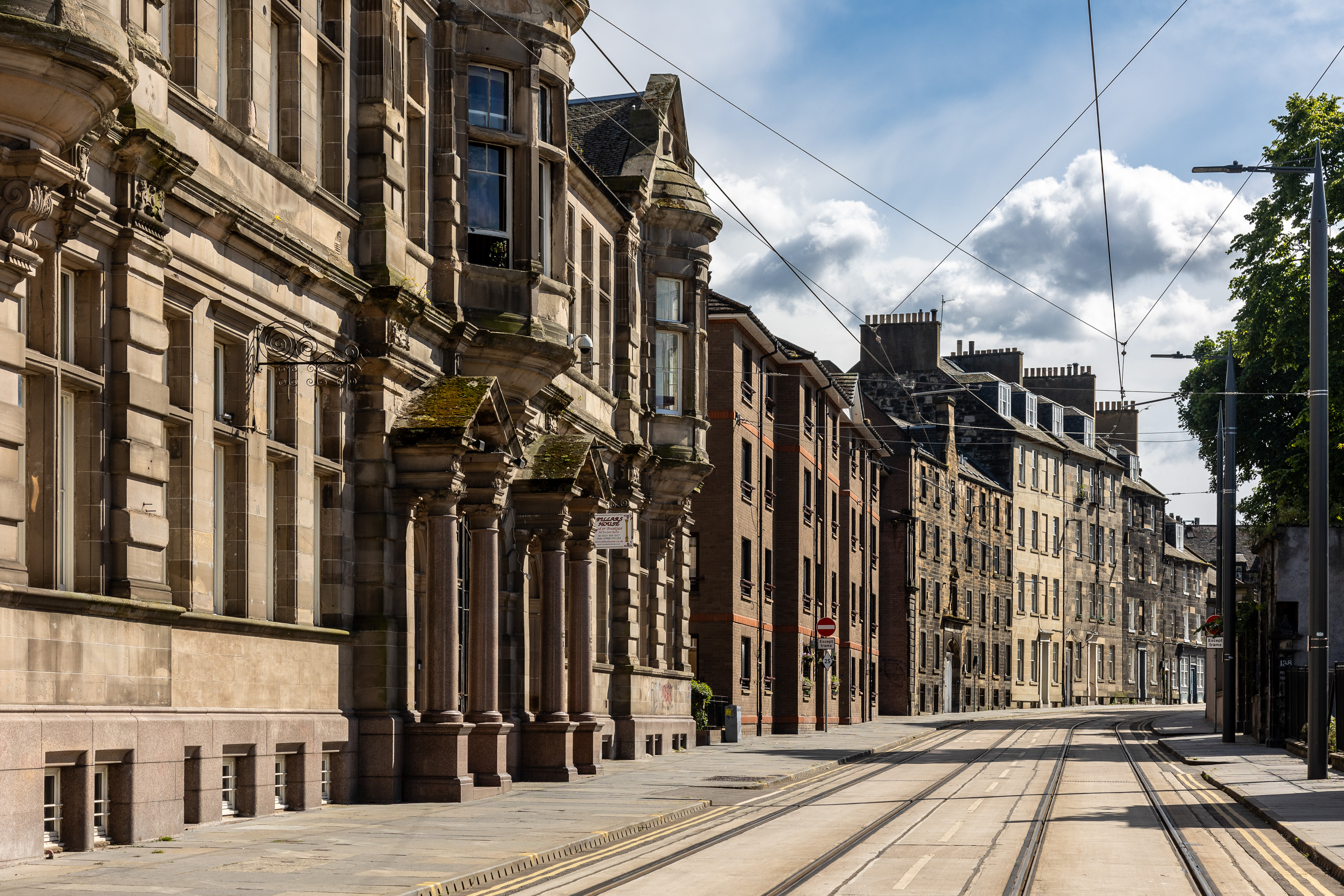
Looking north up Constitution Street from outside the former Dundee, Perth & London Shipping Company offices.

Constitution Street is a thoroughfare in Leith, Edinburgh, Scotland. It runs north from the junction of Leith Walk, Great Junction Street and Duke Street to the Albert Dock in Leith Docks.

== History ==
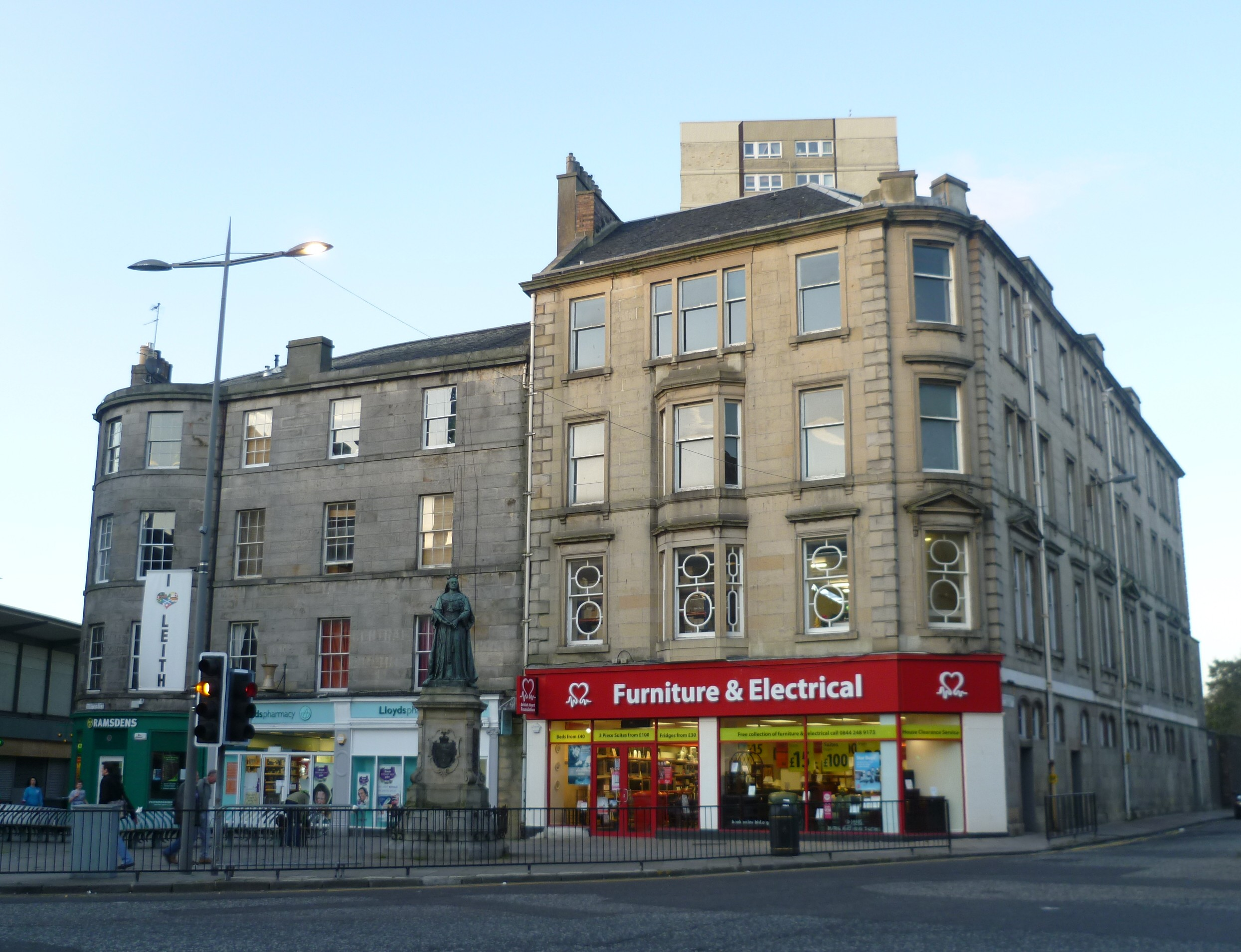
The foot of Leith Walk with Constitution Street on the right, in 2010

The street takes its name from Constitution Hill, which stood on the site of the current Assembly Rooms. The 1777 map of Leith calls it Constitution Road but it only goes from the eastern entrance to South Leith Churchyard to Bernard Street.

The street at its current length was only completed in 1800, at that time being built as a bypass from Bernard Street to Leith Walk, avoiding the crowded and twisting medieval streets of old Leith. The street at that time was causewayed, rising around two metres above natural ground level. Buildings which predate this now have their original ground floor rooms buried at basement level.

The bulk of the buildings lining the street remain substantially unchanged for over a century, but the previously industrial north end is now largely redeveloped as housing.

== Notable events ==
On 9 January 1823 the last two men executed for piracy in Scotland were hanged at the north end of the street (near what is now Tower Street). The two men were Peter Heaman from Karlskrona in Sweden and Francois Gautiez from France. They were found guilty in the summer of 1822 of capturing the brig "Jane", en route from Gibraltar to Brazil, killing its master and stealing 38,000 Spanish dollars. One account says their bodies were afterwards awarded to Dr Alexander Monro for dissection. A second account says they were buried where executed. Two bodies were discovered during an archaeological dig at the north end of the street in approximately the correct area in the summer of 2000, possibly validating the latter claim.

== Appearance in films ==
- The Conquest of the South Pole (1989) starring Ewen Bremner and John Michie
- Trainspotting (1996) starring Ewen Bremner and Ewan McGregor
- Sunshine on Leith (2013) starring Peter Mullan

== Transport ==
=== Tram ===
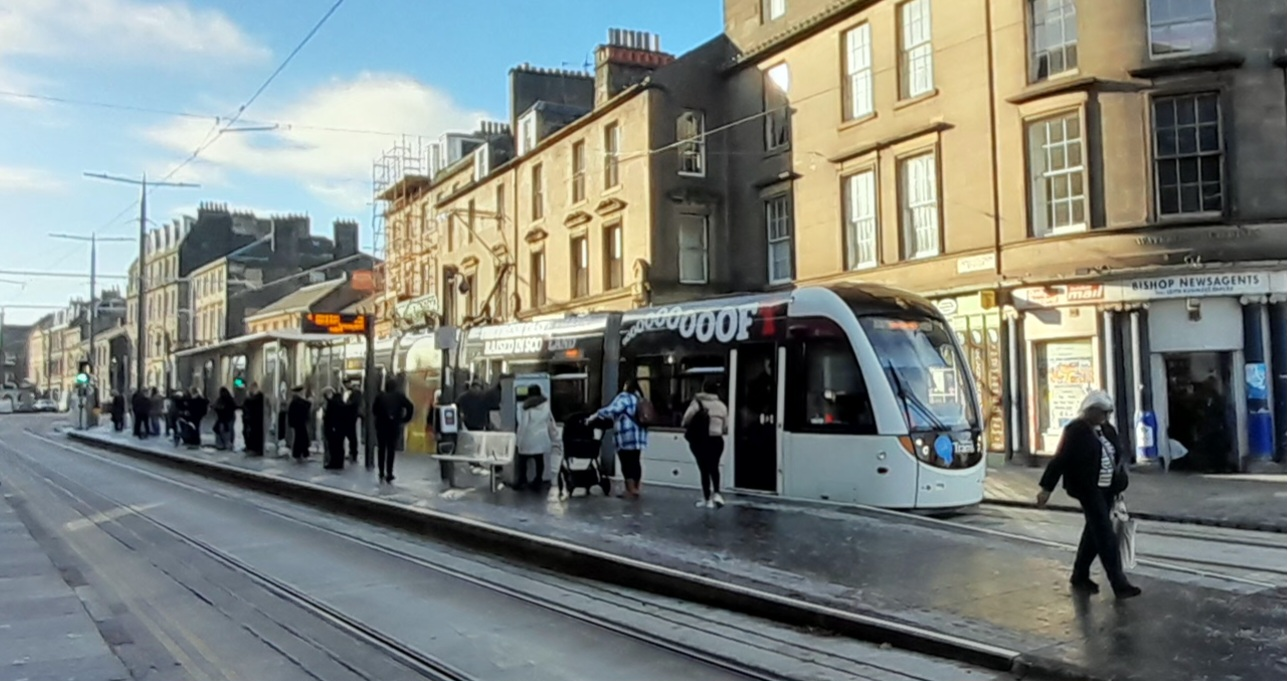
Newhaven-bound tram stopping at The Shore

Constitution Street has tram stops at both its north and south ends. The southern end of the street is tram-only.

==== Foot of the Walk ====
Preceding station	Edinburgh Trams	Following station
The Shore towards Newhaven	Newhaven – Edinburgh Airport	Balfour Street towards Airport

==== The Shore ====
Preceding station	Edinburgh Trams	Following station
Port of Leith towards Newhaven	Newhaven – Edinburgh Airport	Foot of the Walk towards Airport

== Notable buildings ==
In the clearances of the 1950s, although mainly centred on the Kirkgate to the west, Constitution Street lost some buildings of importance, notably Lord Balmerino's House dating from around 1670.

East of Bernard Street, the most notable building is the classical Assembly Rooms, the former Leith Exchange building.

Leith Police Station, formerly Leith Town Hall, built in 1827 to a design by R & R Dickson.

The Church of St. James was designed by George Gilbert Scott, built in 1862. Its stone spire was truncated in 1977.

The churchyard at the south end links to South Leith Parish Church but is cared for by City of Edinburgh Council. The churchyard was only used for burial from the mid 17th century, earlier interments being inside the church, beneath the parishioners usual seating position (or threaded in the rafters if you had a balcony position). In 2009, an excavation linked to the construction of Edinburgh Trams unearthed several bodies just outside the churchyard wall.

Notable buildings on Constitution Street
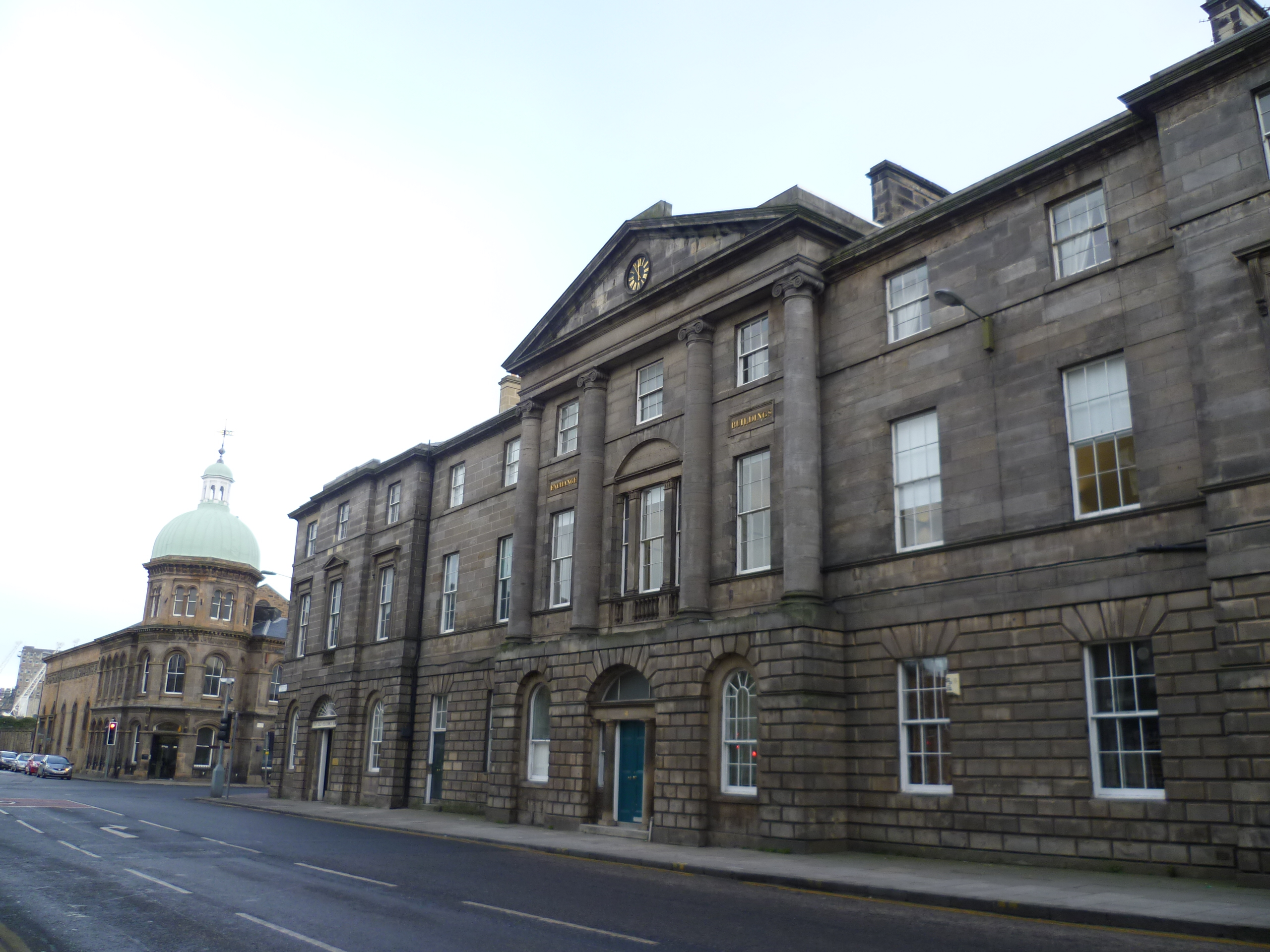
Exchange Buildings and Assembly Rooms

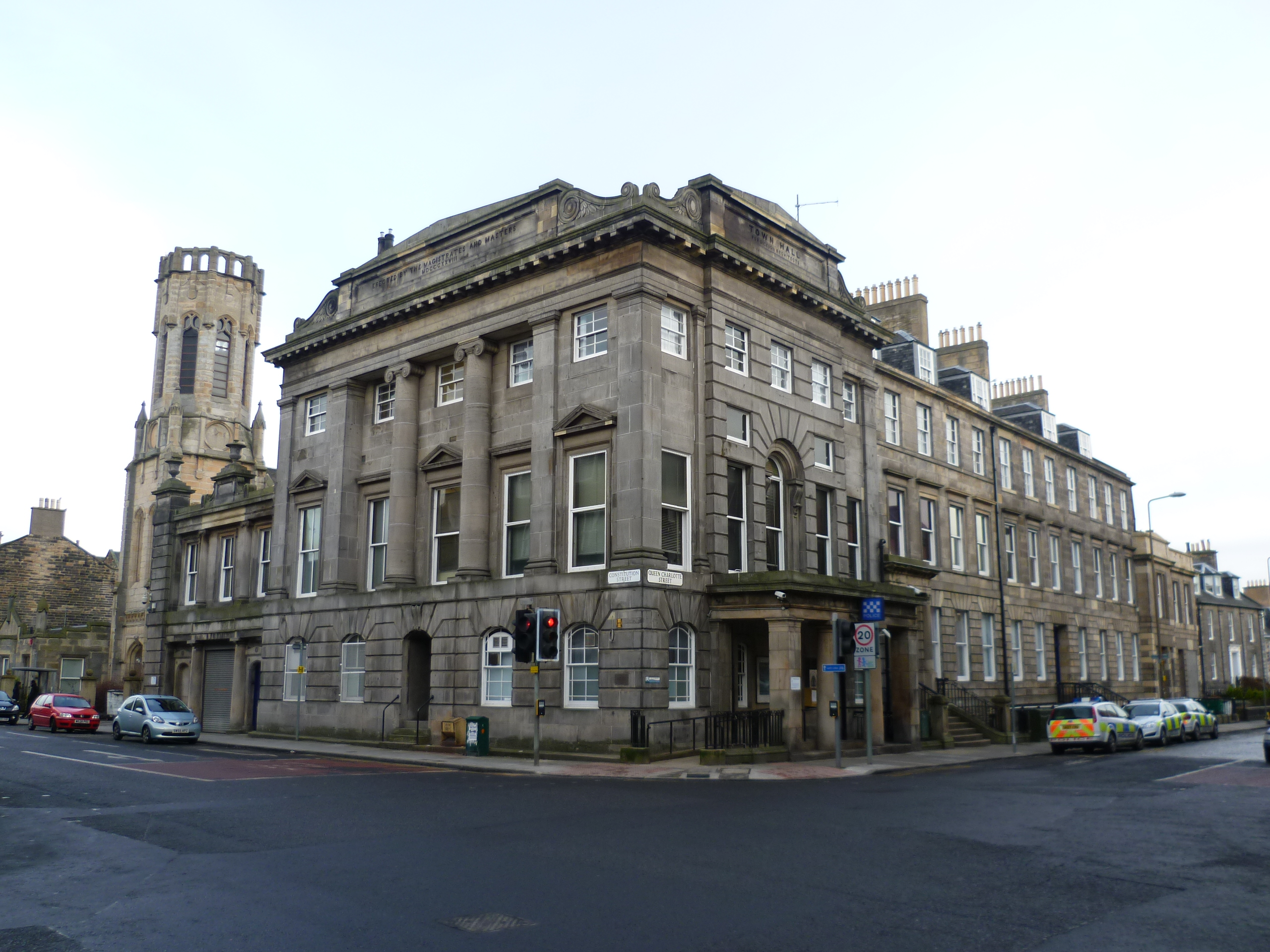
Leith Police Station, originally Leith Town Hall, 1827

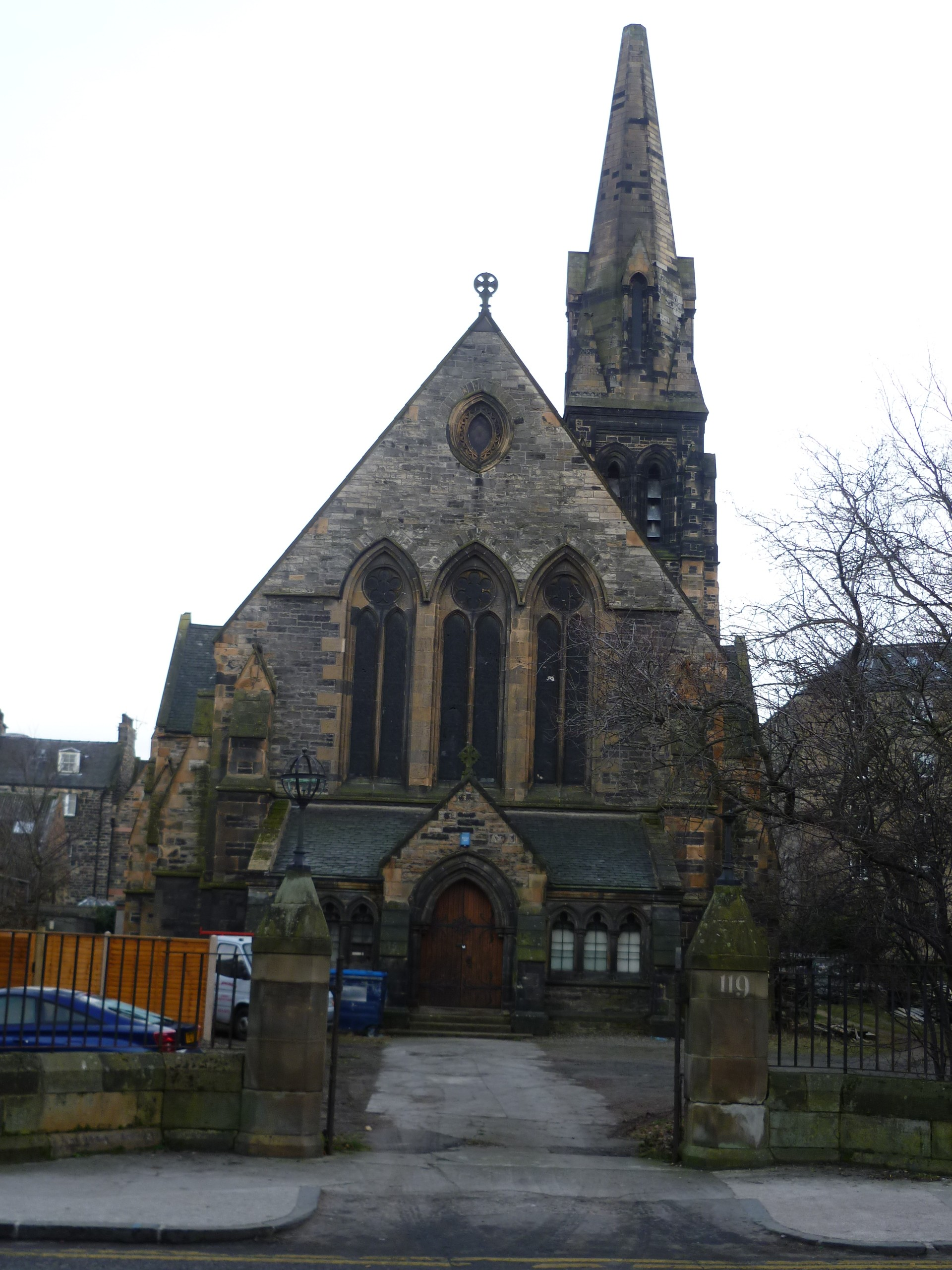
Former Church of St. James

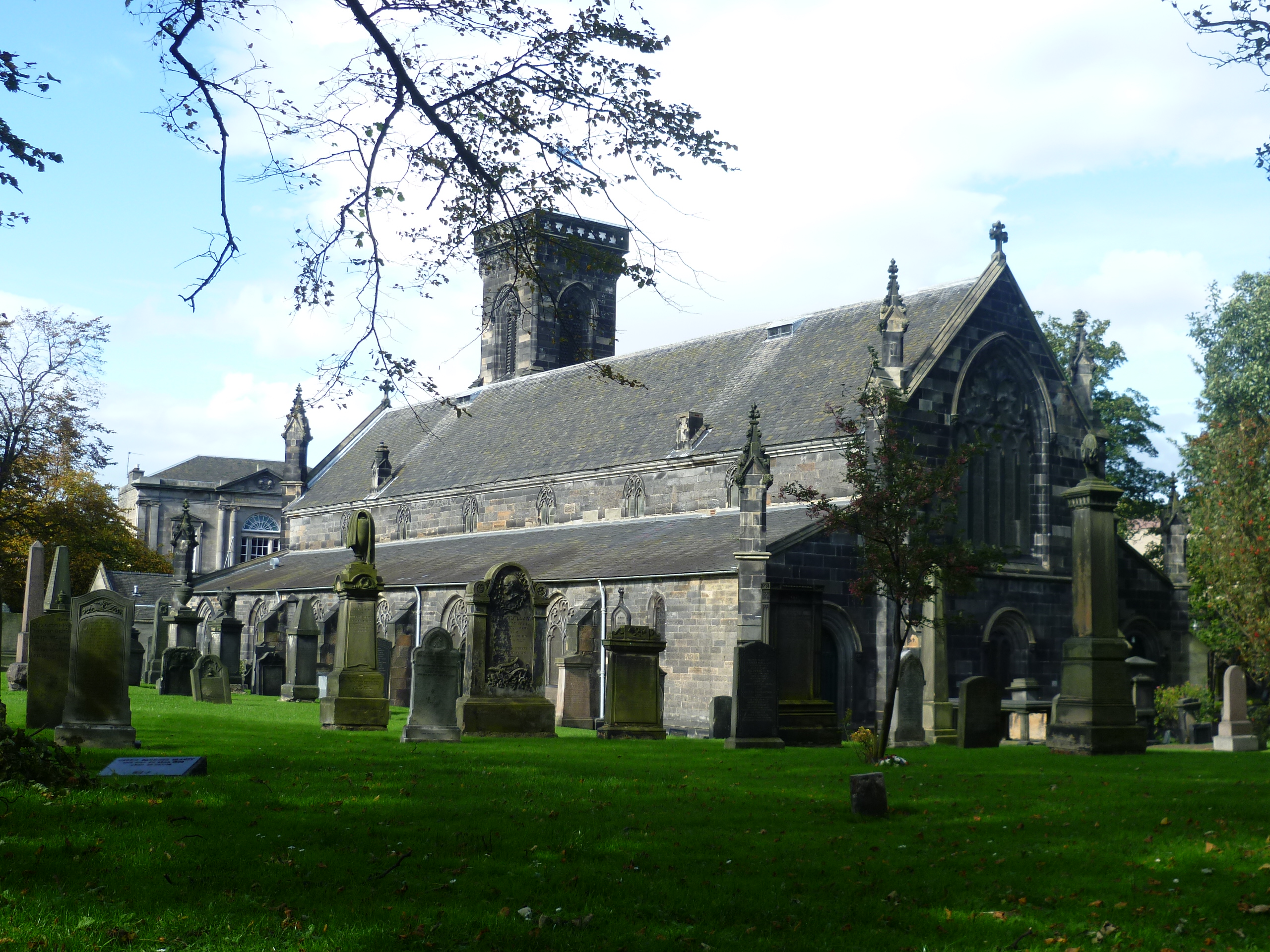
South Leith Parish Church
