= Bernard Street, Edinburgh =

Street in Leith, Edinburgh, Scotland

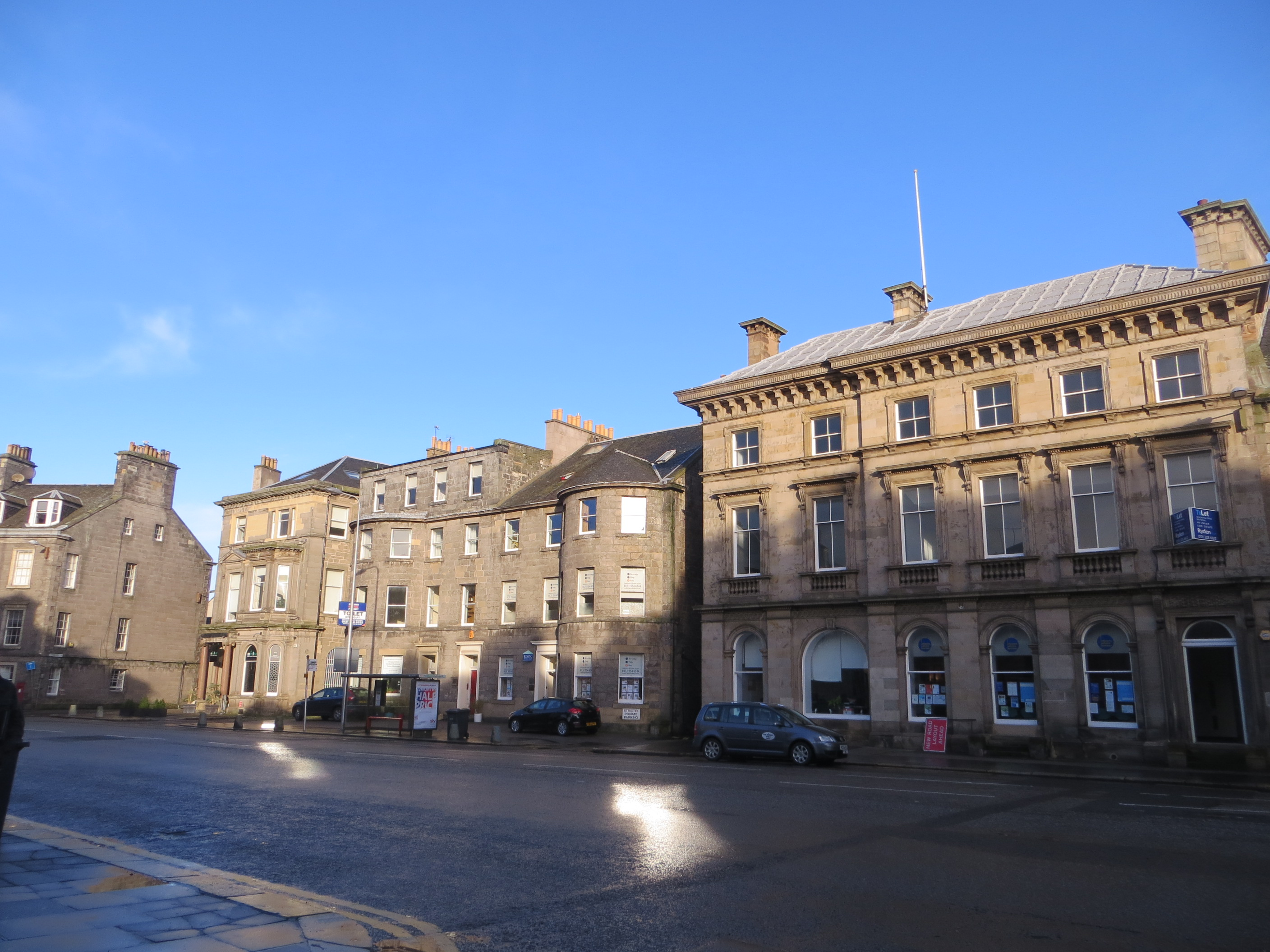
Bernard Street, Leith, north side - Currie Line office on right

Bernard Street is a thoroughfare in Leith, Edinburgh, Scotland. It runs west north westerly from the junction of Constitution Street and Baltic Street to meet the Water of Leith at The Shore. It forms the northern boundary of what was known in the 19th century as 'Old Leith'.

== Overview ==
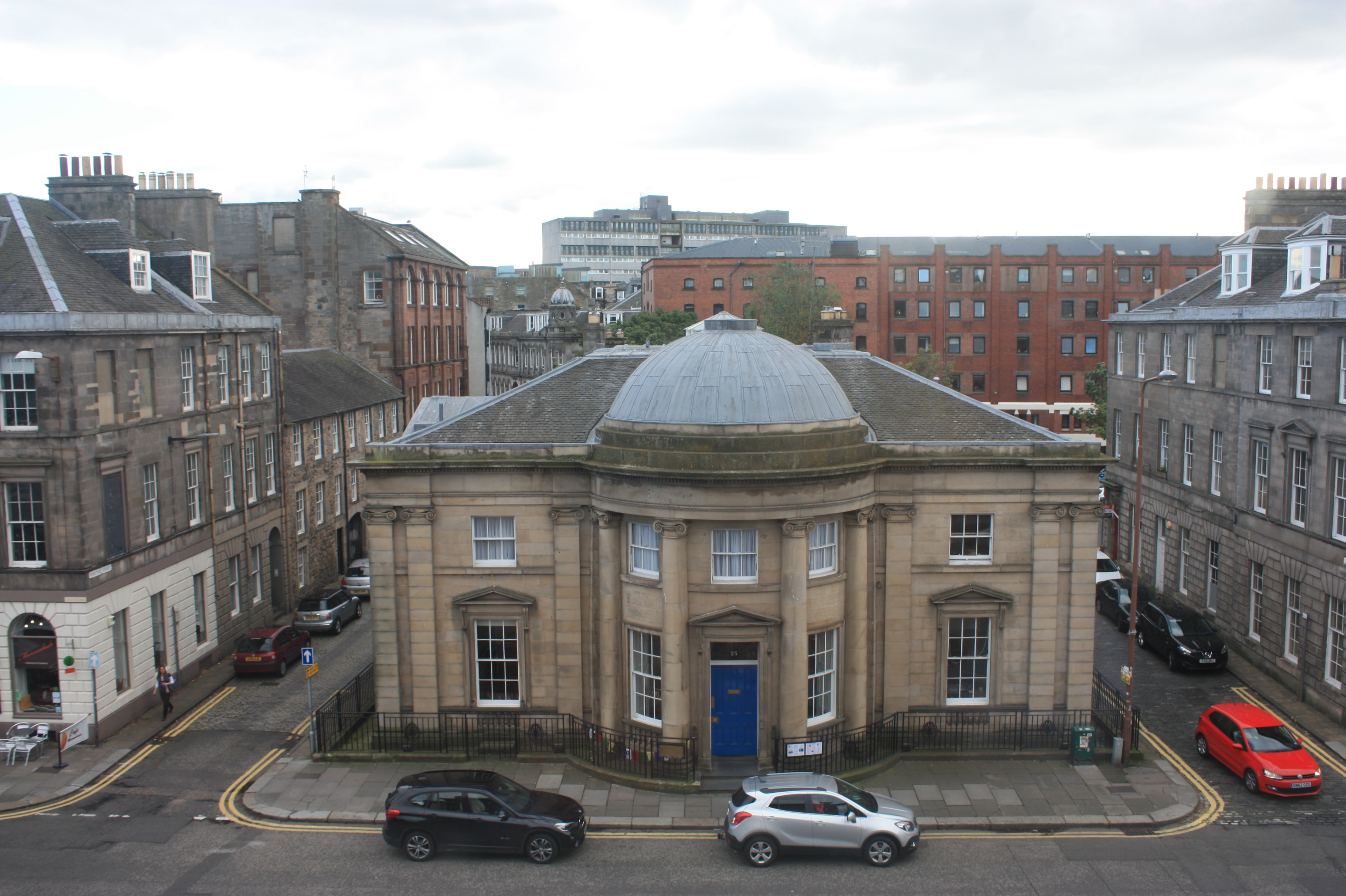
Leith Bank, Bernard Street, Edinburgh

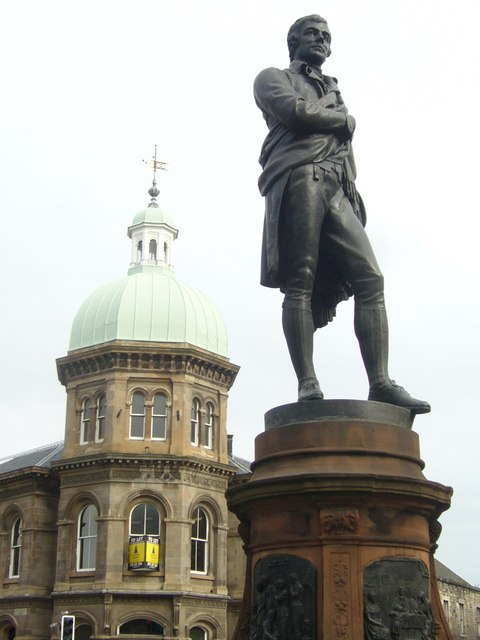
Statue of Robert Burns in Bernard Street

It is thought that Bernard Street takes its name from Bernard Lindsay of Lochhill, a courtier to James VI and I, who was granted the King's Wark in 1604. An early name for the area was "Bernard's Neuk".

In 1780, the first public sewer in Scotland was built in Bernard Street, flowing into the Water of Leith. The iron seal of the sewer is still visible by the bridge at the end of Bernard Street.

At the east end of the street is a statue of Robert Burns by David Watson Stevenson erected in 1898. Other buildings include the premises of Leith Merchants Club and the former home of the Leith Banking Company. Today, the buildings of Bernard Street have been converted to use as pubs, cafes and the offices of media, marketing and publishing companies.

From the mid-18th century, a stagecoach service ran from Bernard Street to the city's Old Town. Bernard Street forms part of the main coastal route around north Edinburgh. From the 1970s until the 1990s a Bernard Street bypass was proposed, Taking traffic northward through the docks and closing the street to through traffic at its east end. This was then to preserve Bernard Street as a historic enclave.

Bernard Street was a stop on Leith's electric tram line from 1905 until 1955

With the completion of the Edinburgh Trams light rail line extension to Newhaven in 2023, a new tram stop opened at the junction of Bernard Street and Constitution Street.

The decision was made to name the stop The Shore due to the area's close proximity.

== Buildings of interest ==
- King's Wark - 1702 with silhouette of the former forestair on its north flank
- Currie Line offices - lead roofed building at centre of north side
- Former Norwegian consulate/Christian Salvesen HQ - south side, west of domed bank
- Waterloo Buildings - huge tenement of 1816
- Leith Bank 1806 - by John Paterson
- Merchant House 1812 - former British Linen Bank and later Scottish headquarters of G4S security

== See also ==
- Edinburgh Street Tramways
- Leith Corporation Tramways
