= Crann-nan-gad =

Type of plough from the Western Isles, Scotland

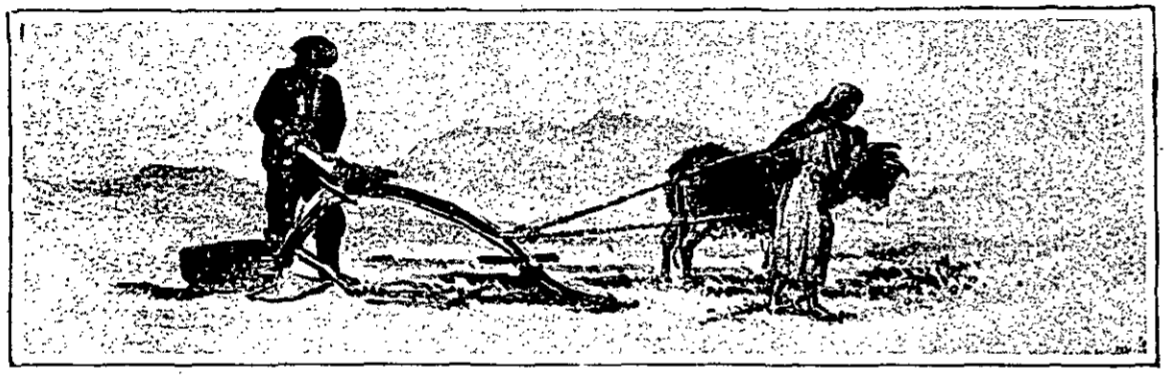
Crann-nan-gad depicted in 1898

The crann-nan-gad was a type of plough formerly used in the Western Isles of Scotland. It was one of the earliest types of plough used in Hebridean crofting, and consisted of a small crooked piece of wood with an iron tip at one end and a top-mounted handle or stilt (thus, a single-stilted plough). Its curving coulter and sock were both made of iron. It could be drawn by up to four horses, although one or two were more usual. The design of the crann-nan-gad was specifically related to the environmental conditions of Hebridean farms, facilitating paring and skimming of the shallow soil. The plough's tip could run along the ground, which enabled its user to lift it over large stones embedded in the earth.

It was widely used in the larger Hebridean islands, spreading from Harris to Lewis in the mid-18th century. In addition to Lewis and Harris, it was also used on the Uists and Barra. Its use survived into the 20th century in the parish of Barvas on Lewis. A single example of the crann-nan-gad is preserved in the collections of the National Museum of Scotland.
