= Andrew Peebles Aitken =

Scottish agricultural chemist

Andrew Peebles Aitken FRSE FBSE (1843-1904) was a Scottish agricultural chemist remembered primarily for his research into fertiliser response times. He laid the foundations of modern understanding of increased crop yields through the use of artificial fertilisers.

== Life ==
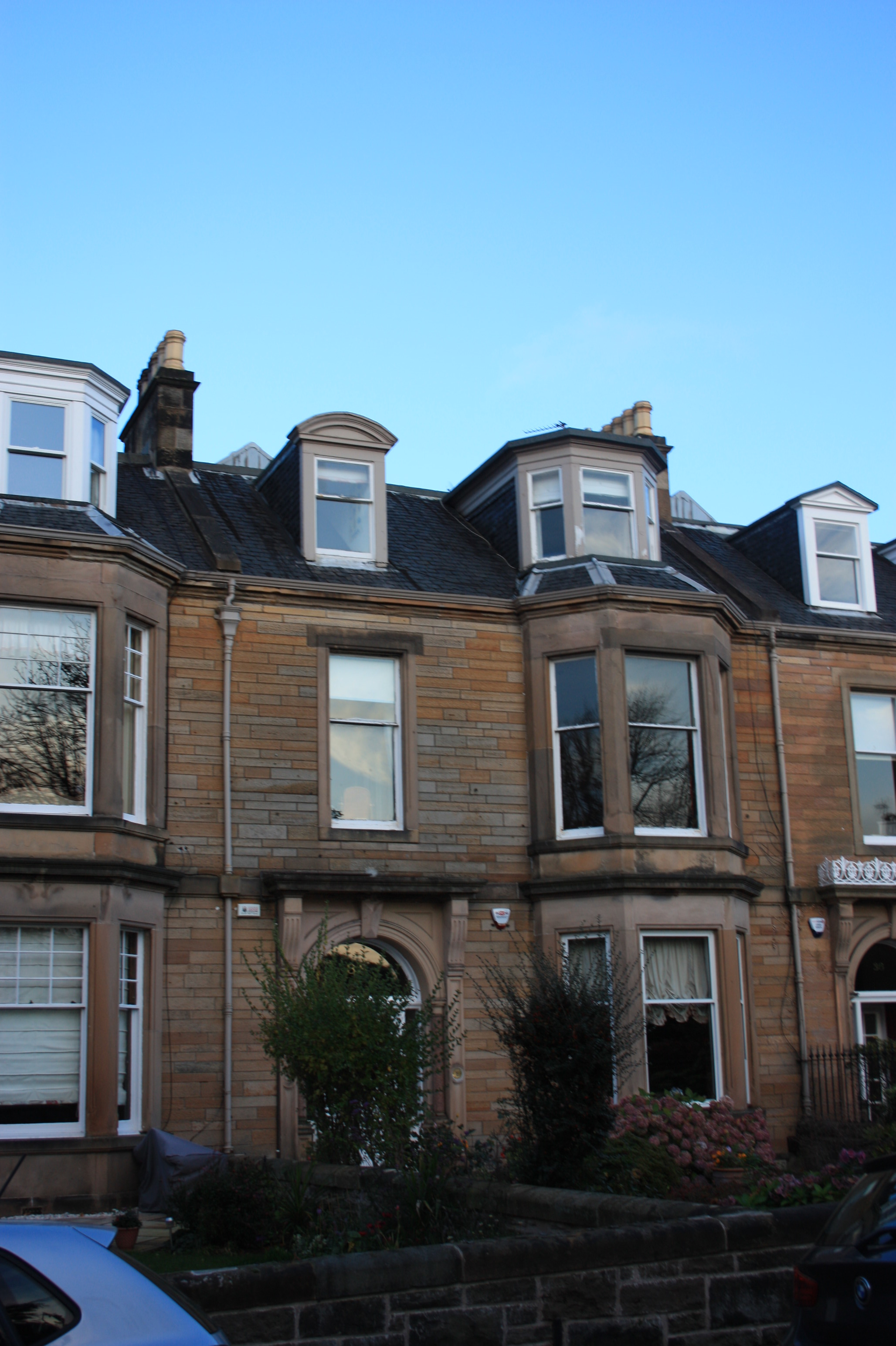
38 Garscube Terrace, Edinburgh

He was born at 122 Rose St Edinburgh on 30 April 1843, the son of Mary Ann (née Smith) (1819-1890) and John Aitken (1814-1886) a cabinetmaker, the 3rd child of 12. He studied at both the University of Edinburgh and the University of Heidelberg in Germany, graduating MA in 1867 and BSc in 1871. He received a doctorate in Chemistry (DSc) in 1873.

His career began as assistant to Prof Alexander Crum Brown at the University of Edinburgh in 1875 he then moved to William Dick's Veterinary College as Professor of Chemistry and Toxicology. This was then based at 8 Clyde Street in the city centre. He also continued to lecture on Agricultural Chemistry at the university. He was elected a Fellow of the Botanical Society of Edinburgh in 1871.

In 1878 he was elected a Fellow of the Royal Society of Edinburgh. His proposers were Alexander Crum Brown, Sir Thomas Richard Fraser, John Hutton Balfour and Andrew Douglas Maclagan. Only from 1884 is he listed as a homeowner (probably indicating his marriage) living at 18 Dublin Street in Edinburgh's New Town.

He was President of the Botanical Society of Edinburgh from 1895 to 1897.

He died at home, 38 Garscube Terrace in the Coltbridge district of Edinburgh on Sunday 17 April 1904. He is buried in Rosebank Cemetery in north Edinburgh.

== Family ==
He was married to Georgina Burnett Brown (1855-1922). They had three daughters, Katharine, Helen and Jessie.
