= Jessie Mann =

Scottish photographer (1805–1867)

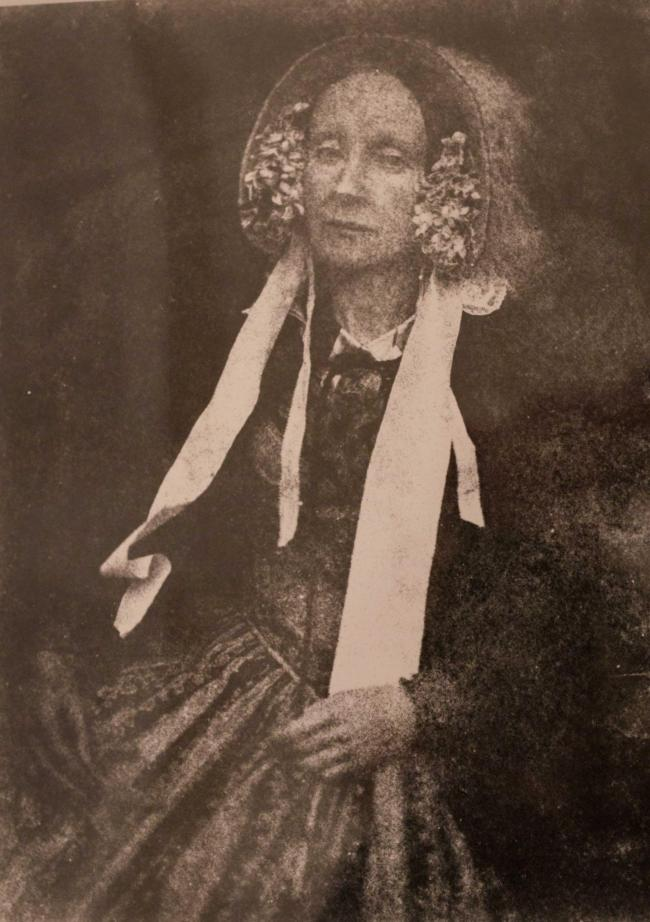
- An 1844 photograph by David Octavius Hill, thought to be Jessie Mann
- Born: Janet Mann; 20 January 1805; Perth, Scotland
- Died: 21 April 1867 (aged 62); Edinburgh, Scotland
- Occupations: Photographer and assistant
- Employer(s): David Octavius Hill & Robert Adamson
- Known for: Pioneer in photography

Janet Mann (Jessie) (20 January 1805 – 21 April 1867) was the studio assistant of the pioneering Scottish photographers David Octavius Hill and Robert Adamson. She is "a strong candidate as the first Scottish woman photographer" and one of the first women anywhere to be involved in photography.

== Early life ==
Mann was born on 20 January 1805, in Perth, Scotland, the daughter of Alexander Mann, a house painter. She grew up there with her four sisters and one brother, opposite the house of David Octavius Hill. When her father died in 1839 she moved to Edinburgh with her two unmarried sisters, Elizabeth and Margaret, to live with their brother Alexander, a solicitor, who eventually became Hill's solicitor.

== Career ==
Mann moved to Leopold Place, when Alexander married. This was near where the Hill & Adamson studio, "Rock House" Scotland's first photographic studio on Calton Hill, Edinburgh. She became an assistant to David Octavius Hill and Robert Adamson, probably working on photographic processing and printing. Hill was an established painter who collaborated with Adamson, who was an expert photographer using early photographic techniques. Miss Mann was employed to help them photograph the 450 ministers of the Church of Scotland who broke away from the church to establish the Free Church of Scotland. This was known as the Great Disruption. She worked with Hill and Adamson for at least three years, until it closed after Adamson's death in 1848. She went on to become a school housekeeper in Musselburgh.

She returned to Edinburgh and died there of a stroke on 21 April 1867. She is buried at Rosebank Cemetery.

== Legacy ==
It is reasoned that a print in the Scottish National Portrait Gallery, of the King Frederick II of Saxony in 1844, taken at the studio while Hill and Adamson were unavailable, was taken by Mann. The portrait was known to have been taken by an assistant to Hill and Adamson. Tate curator Carol Jacobi says this demonstrates that "she must have been part of their skilful understanding of how you set up a photograph, so she is a real pioneer." A letter from the painter James Naysmith to Hill, written in 1845, praises Mann as "that most skillful and zealous of assistants".

Mann was included in the 2016 exhibition at Tate Britain, Painting with Light: Art and Photography from the Pre-Raphaelites to the Modern Age.

Mann was featured as a character in The Secrets of Bythswood Square (2024) by Scottish author Sara Sheridan. The main character in this historical fiction about pioneer female photographers is Ellory Mann, an imagined cousin of Jessie's who works with her as an assistant to Hill and Adamson and who then travels to Glasgow to set up her own studio. Sheridan talked about the photograph that inspired her iteration of Mann's character in an interview with National Galleries of Scotland curator, Grainne Rice.
