= Rosebank Cemetery =

Cemetery in Edinburgh, Scotland

Coordinates: 55.9677°N 3.1850°W

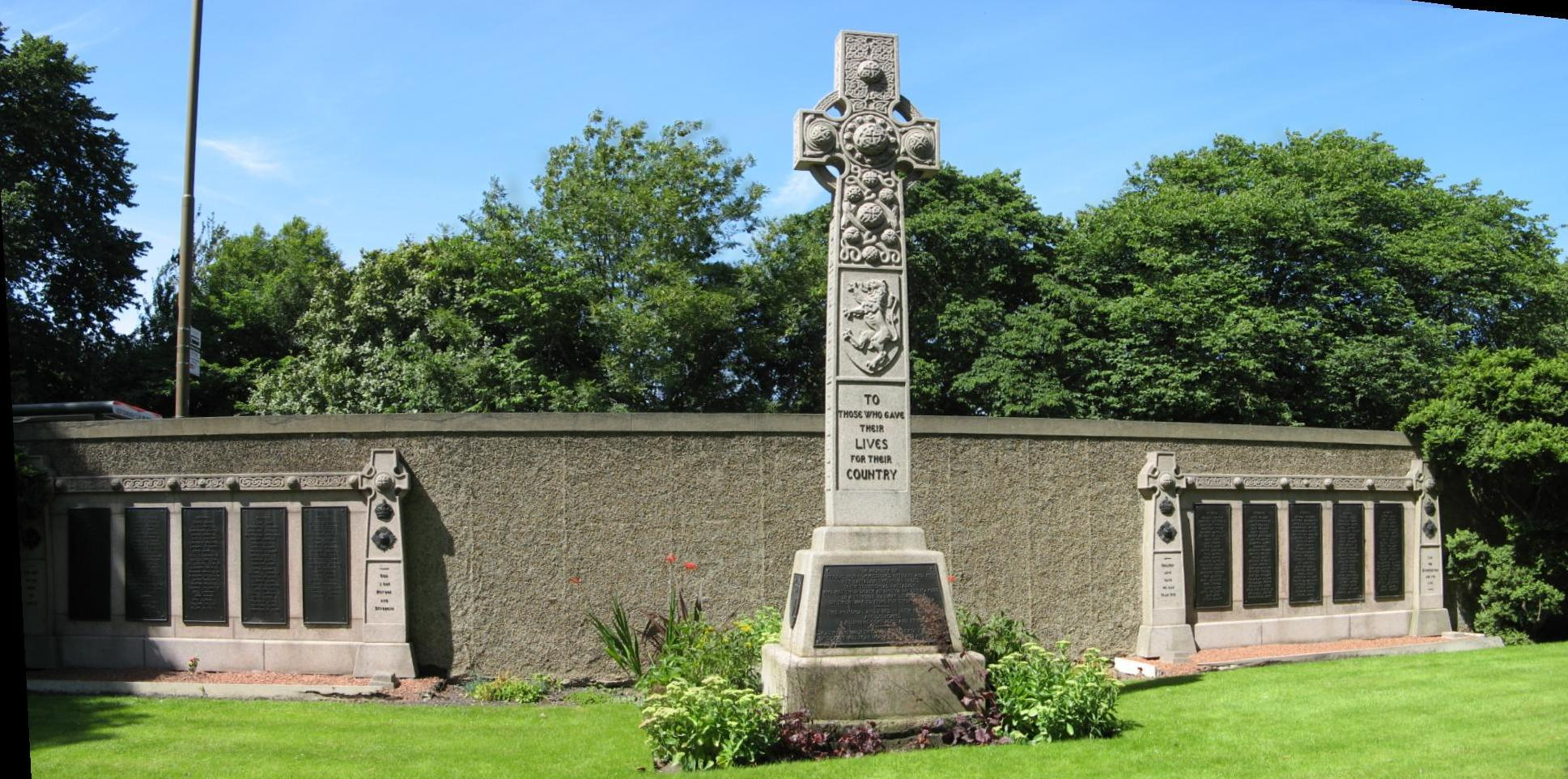
- Memorial to soldiers killed in the Gretna rail disaster of 1915.
- Interactive map of Rosebank Cemetery

Details
- Established: 1846
- Location: Pilrig, Edinburgh
- Country: Scotland, UK
- Type: Public
- Size: 4.37 hectares (10.8 acres)

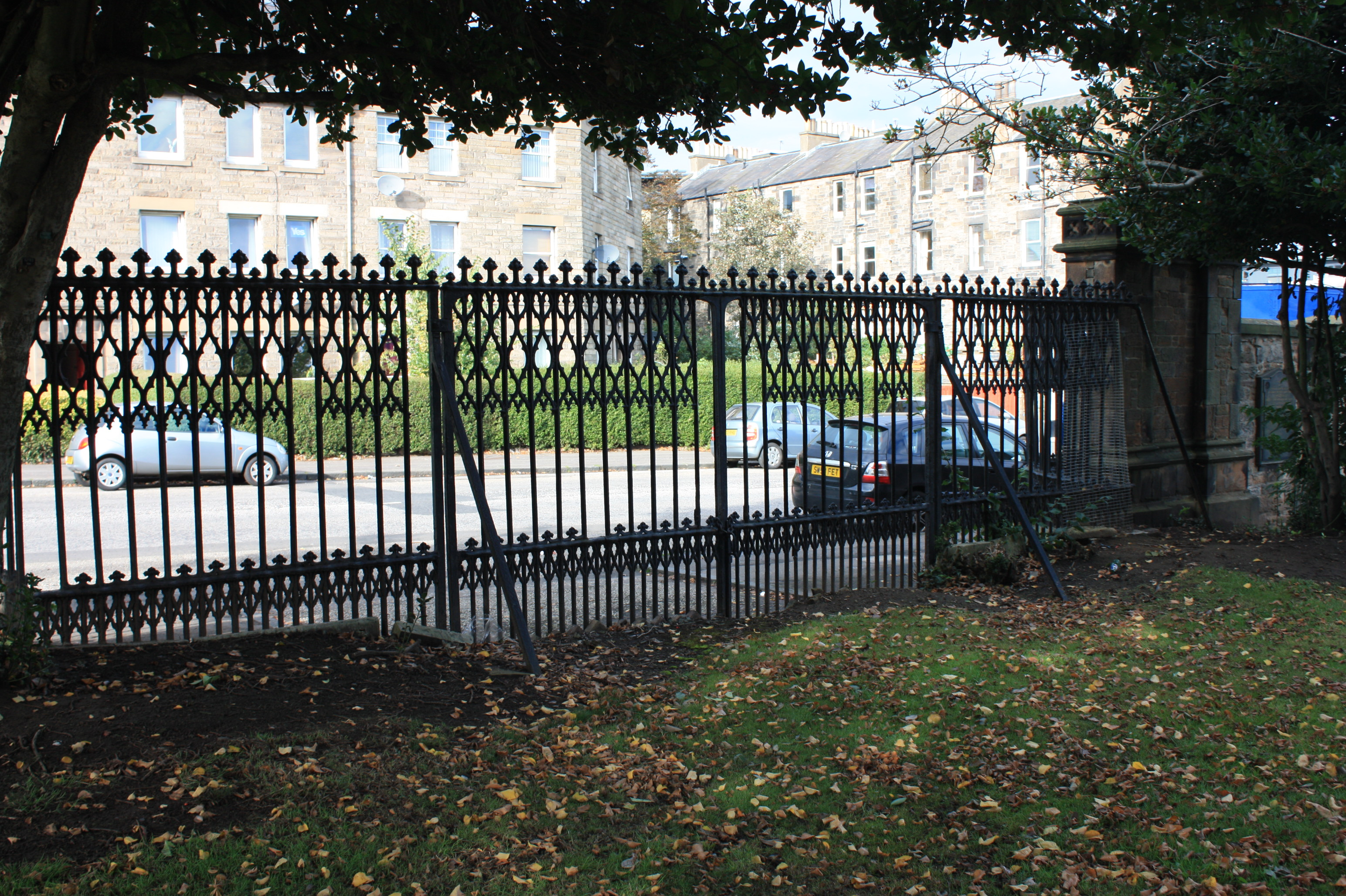
The old western entrance to Rosebank Cemetery (now sealed)

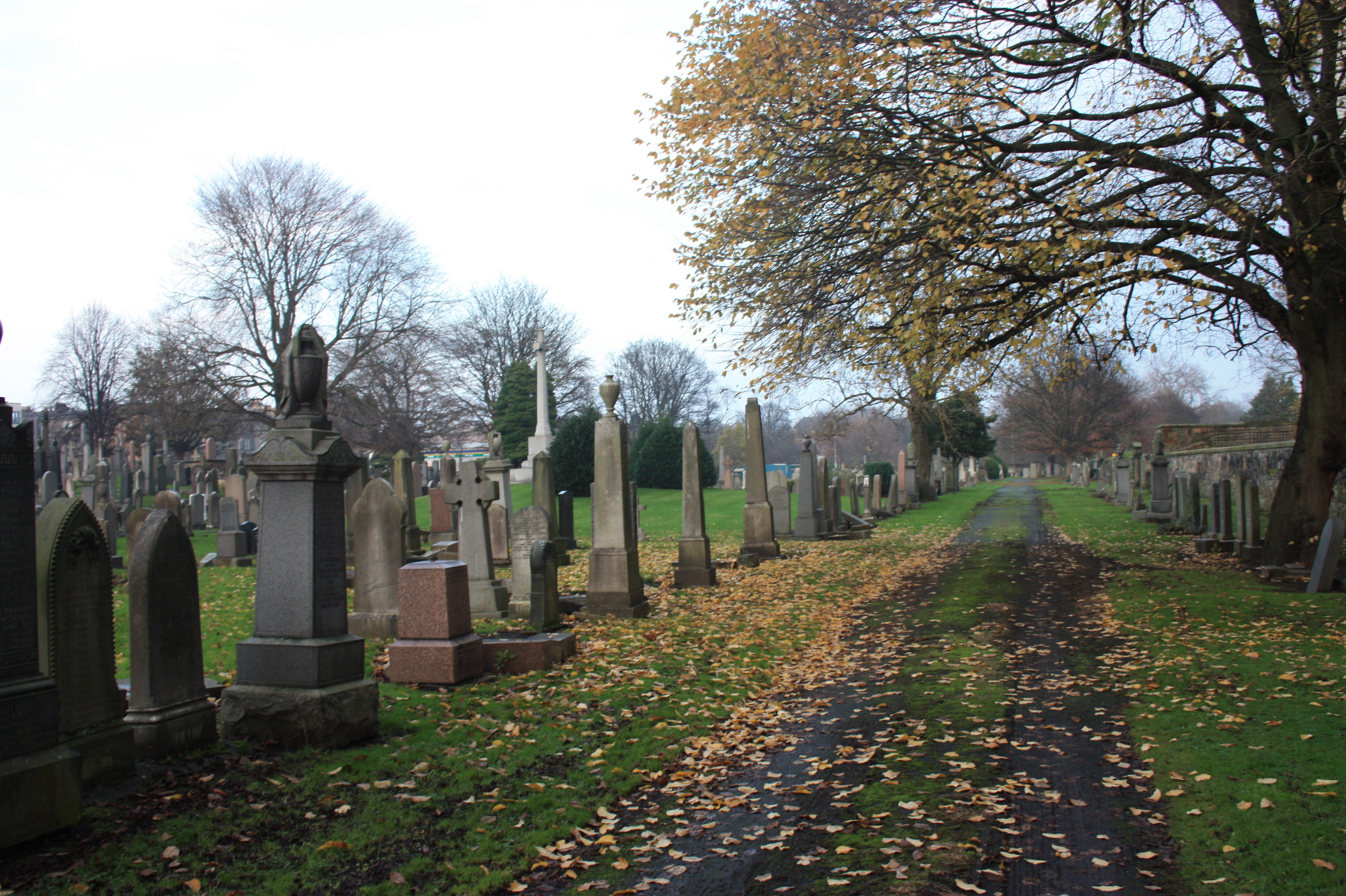
Rosebank Cemetery general view

Rosebank Cemetery is a 19th-century cemetery in Edinburgh, Scotland, at the junction of Pilrig Street and Broughton Road in the Pilrig area, close to the historical boundary of Leith. The cemetery is protected as a category C listed building.

== History ==
The cemetery was developed by the Edinburgh and Leith Cemetery Company, with David Cousin as architect, and opened on 20 September 1846. It covers an area of 4.37 hectares (10.8 acres). Originally known as the Edinburgh and Leith Cemetery, the cemetery proved popular and was extended eastwards around 1880.

The main entrance was originally from the north-west (Broughton Road) but this has been sealed. The sole entrance is now from the north-east (Pilrig Street). The latter originally had an entrance lodge above the gate, but this was demolished around 1975.

The cemetery was in independent private ownership until around 1980 when the City of Edinburgh Council then took over the grounds.

== Memorials ==
A large memorial at the furthest point from the current Pilrig Street entrance, lying against Broughton Road wall near North Pilrig Heights, marks a mass grave and commemorates the Quintinshill Disaster of 22 May 1915, in which 215 soldiers of the 1st/7th Battalion The Royal Scots were killed. The men, mostly from Leith, were on their way to board ship at Liverpool in order to travel to the battlefront at Gallipoli. The handful of survivors were sent onwards the following day. The bodies of those killed in the railway disaster were returned to Leith and buried with great aplomb on 24 May with the 15th and 16th battalions Royal Scots serving as guard of honour. These are among 270 First World War casualties and 36 Second World War casualties interred at Rosebank.

The cemetery also houses the main war memorial to the two world wars, serving the Pilrig area, marked by a white cross designed by Sir Edwin Lutyens. Over and above this memorial and the Gretna Memorial there are several war graves scattered through the cemetery for individuals who died of wounds or disease on return from the war.

A number of 19th-century merchants and ship-owners, shipbuilders and ship-masters from Leith are buried at Rosebank. There are also several 20th-century Sikh and Islamic burials. The apparently high number of "pilots" refers to harbour pilots (the original meaning) rather than aircraft pilots. Unusual surnames found include Arcus, Carnie, Combe, Cormack, Eunson, Flucker, Goalen, Junner, Kellock, Ketchen, Spaven, Tilloch and Waldie.

Those who are homeless and die on the street along with several stillborn children (Scots law requires burial not cremation) are buried at the cemetery. The latter are marked by a modern monument giving a place to remember them, in interlocking granite pieces representing mother and child. The inscription reads "to all those children never known but always loved".

An abnormally high number of stones are noted as "drowned" or "lost at sea" (see Notable Interments).

== Notable interments ==
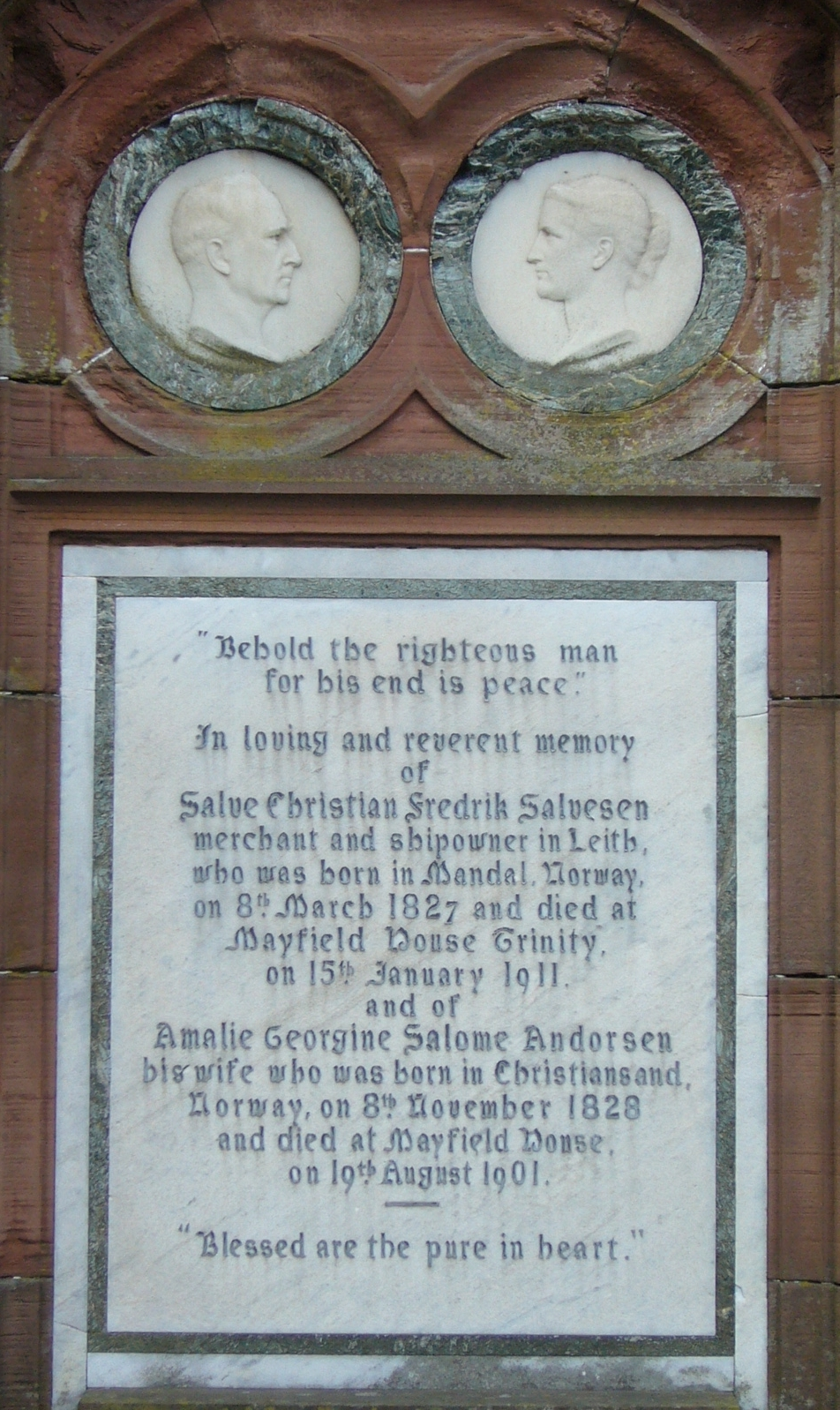
Christian Salvesen grave

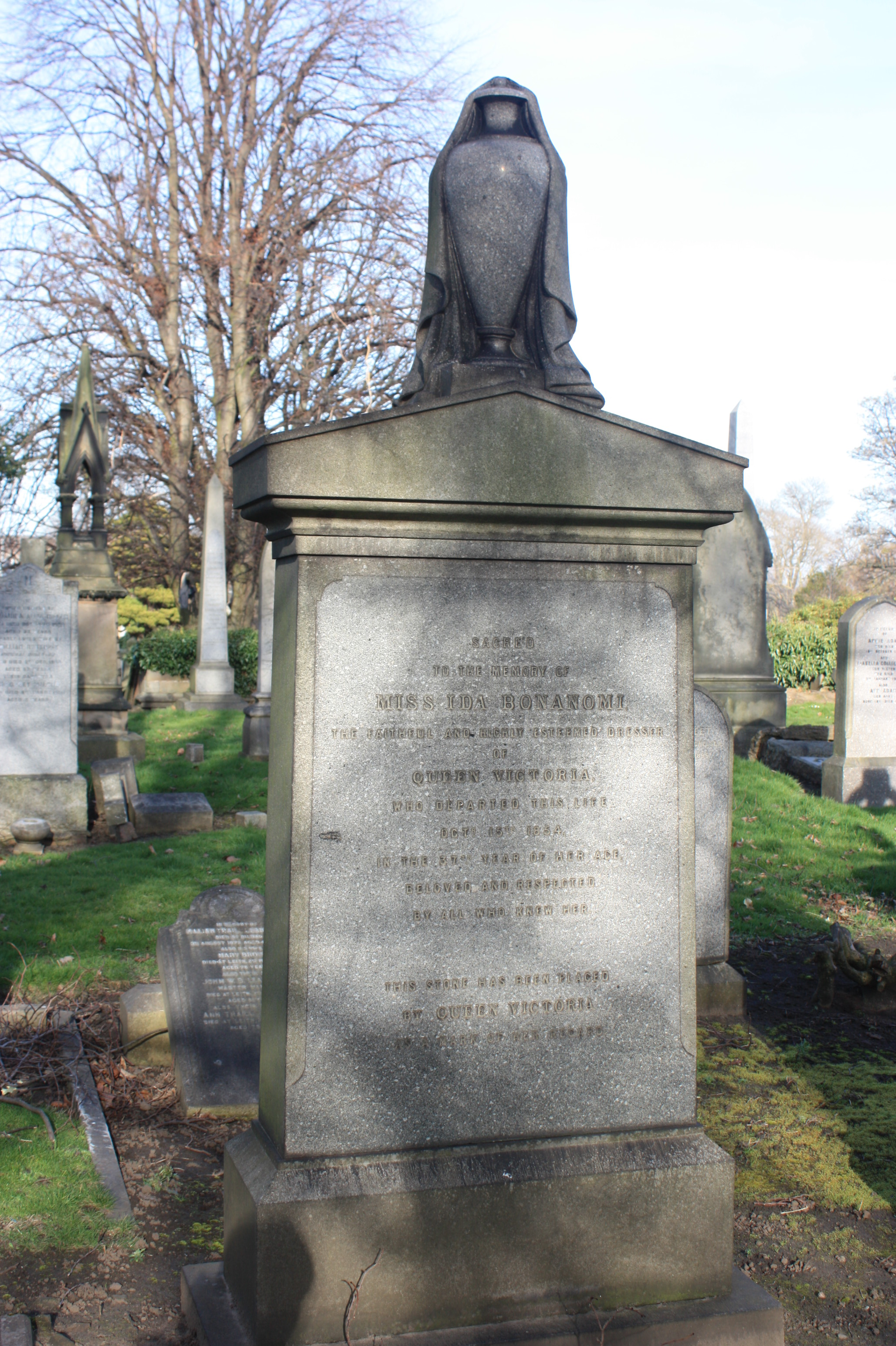
The grave of Ida Bonanomi, Rosebank Cemetery, Edinburgh

- Andrew Peebles Aitken (1843–1904) biochemist
- Thomas Aitken (1833–1912), Provost of Leith from 1887 to 1893
- James Bertram (1816–1861), engineer
- Rev William Garden Blaikie, (1820–1899)
- Alan Brebner (died 1890), civil engineer and an associate of lighthouse designers David and Thomas Stevenson.
- Shipowner Robert Cook (drowned in wreck of SS Roslin in 1888) bronze head by William Brodie
- George Craig (1852–1927) architect. His wife, Annie Blackie is the oldest person in the cemetery (105).
- Monument to the three illegitimate children of Sir George de la Poer Beresford
- Frederick Andrew Fitzpayne (1878–1935) creator of the Leith tram system (Scotland's first electric tram) and then in charge of the combined Edinburgh/Leith tram system
- A rare female war grave from World War I to E.G.Elder of the Women's Royal Naval Service d.7.7.1918, plus a female war grave from World War II to E.W.L.Fruish, also Women's Royal Navy Service
- M.P. Galloway (1843–1919), shipbuilder
- William Gilmour JP FRSE (1843–1905)
- James Douglas Allan Gray (1902–1993) pathologist
- Rev Prof James Harper (1795–1879)
- Dr John Henderson (1819–1901) Provost of Leith 1875 to 1881 and creator of the Leith Improvement Scheme and Henderson Street
- Lady Elizabeth Campbell Honyman (1784–1874)
- James Campbell Irons (1840–1910) legal author and geologist
- Andrew Leslie (1818–1894), shipbuilder
- Robert Lindsay, pharmacist, co-founder of Lindsay & Gilmour
- James Logan Mack (d.1939) author
- Charles Mackinlay (1809–1867) whisky blender
- Jessie Mann (1805-1867) photographer and studio assistant
- George Melrose (d.1896) founder of Melrose-Drover
- Sydney Mitchell (1856–1930), architect and his father Sir Arthur Mitchell (1826–1909)
- James Campbell Noble RSA (1846–1913), artist
- William Notman (1809–1893) architect
- Thomas Peddie (1844–1911), railway and civil engineer
- Francis George Pentland (1866–1910) actor better known under the stage name of Frank Worthing (memorial only)
- George Ogilvy Reid (1851–1928), artist
- Ornate monument to Thomas Reid, nurseryman (1805–1848) by Hector Heatly Orrock (1831–1862)
- Prof Edmund Ronalds (1819–1889) chemist
- Lauchlan Rose (1829–1885) founder of Rose's lime juice
- Christian Salvesen (1827–1911), Norwegian merchant who settled at Leith and founded the company which now bears his name, also his older brother, Carl Emil Salvesen (1816–1877) opposite
- James Simpson (Scottish architect) (1832–1894) creator of the Leith Improvement Scheme in 1888
- James Slight (1785–1854), assistant engineer to Robert Stevenson in the building of the Bell Rock Lighthouse and other lighthouse projects and his brother, Alexander Slight (1818–1885) also an engineer
- Henry Stephens (1794–1874), author of The Book of the Farm
- A pair of stones towards the southeast memorialise several members of the Stevenson family drowned in the Eyemouth disaster of 14 October 1881. One is noted as having been "interred 3 March 1882", his body having been washed ashore and identified five months later.
- Rev Dr David Thorburn DD (1805–1893) minister of South Leith Parish Church who defected at the Disruption of 1843
- Andrew Young (1807–1889), author of the hymn There Is a Happy Land

At the dead centre of the main=east-west path lie three conterminous graves of servants of Queen Victoria, each residing at Holyrood Palace: Ida Bonanomi (1818–1854) Queen Victoria's dresser; Owen Gough (1800–1872); and Charles Watty (1814–1889) the Queen's servant for 42 years. The three stones and lairs were paid for by the Queen.
