= F. A. Fitzbayne =

Frederick Andrew Fitzpayne AMIEE (1878–1935) was a British electrical and transport engineer responsible for building Scotland's first electric tram system and running the Edinburgh Corporation Tramway system.

== Life ==
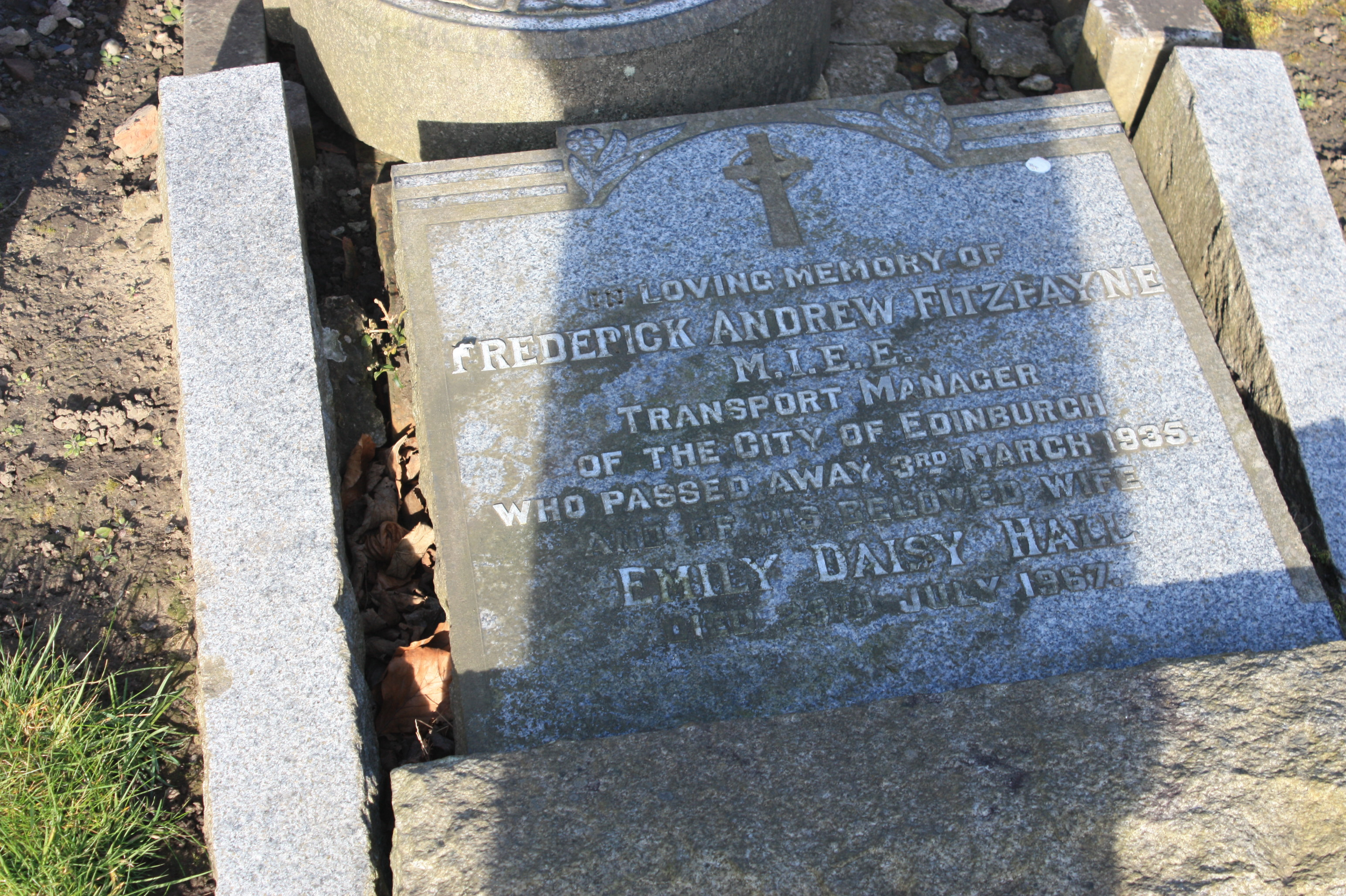
The grave of F. A. Fitzpayne, Rosebank Cemetery, Edinburgh

He was born in southern England on 23 September 1878. He was educated at All Saints School in Bloxham in Devonshire. He then studied electrical engineering at Faraday House in London receiving his diploma in 1897. He served an apprenticeship at Browett Lindley & Co in Manchester before moving to Southend-on-Sea to be involved in his first tramway project for the South London Electric Supply Corporation.

In 1900 he moved to Great Yarmouth working on the installation of electricity under a private company. In 1902 he entered municipal life, when the town council took over the role of installing electric street lights and a tramway. He was Chief Assistant overseeing these projects in both Great Yarmouth and Gorleston.

In 1906 he transferred to Leith Corporation in Scotland to oversee the installation there of Scotland's first electric tram, creating 6 miles of track. In 1909 he was promoted to General Manager of the Leith Tramways. In 1920 Leith and Edinburgh were amalgamated. In 1921 he became Deputy Transport Manager and in 1929 he became full Transport Manager for all Edinburgh. He was also General Manager of the Edinburgh Tramway Corporation. During this period Edinburgh's trams were converted from cable-drawn to electricity, and the rolling stock was changed from timber and iron to fully steel construction. Profit of the transport system increased by 50% in this period.

He lived at 5 Smiths Place, off Leith Walk. In 1932 he chaired a national conference on motor transport held at the Atholl Palace Hotel in Pitlochry.

He died on 3 March 1935 and is buried in Rosebank Cemetery in northern Edinburgh. His toppled stone lies to the south of the Christian Salvesen monument.

Following his death, his house at Smiths Place was demolished to make way for a faux-Georgian infill by Ebenezer James MacRae operating as offices and social club for the teamworks (which were located to the rear).

== Family ==
He was married to Emily Daisy Hall (d.1967). His son, Eric Fitzpayne, was General Manager of Glasgow Corporation Transport. In 1962 his grandson, Alan Fitzpayne, aged only 13, was given the honour of running the last tram through the streets of Clydebank.
