= David Octavius Hill =

Scottish painter, photographer and arts activist

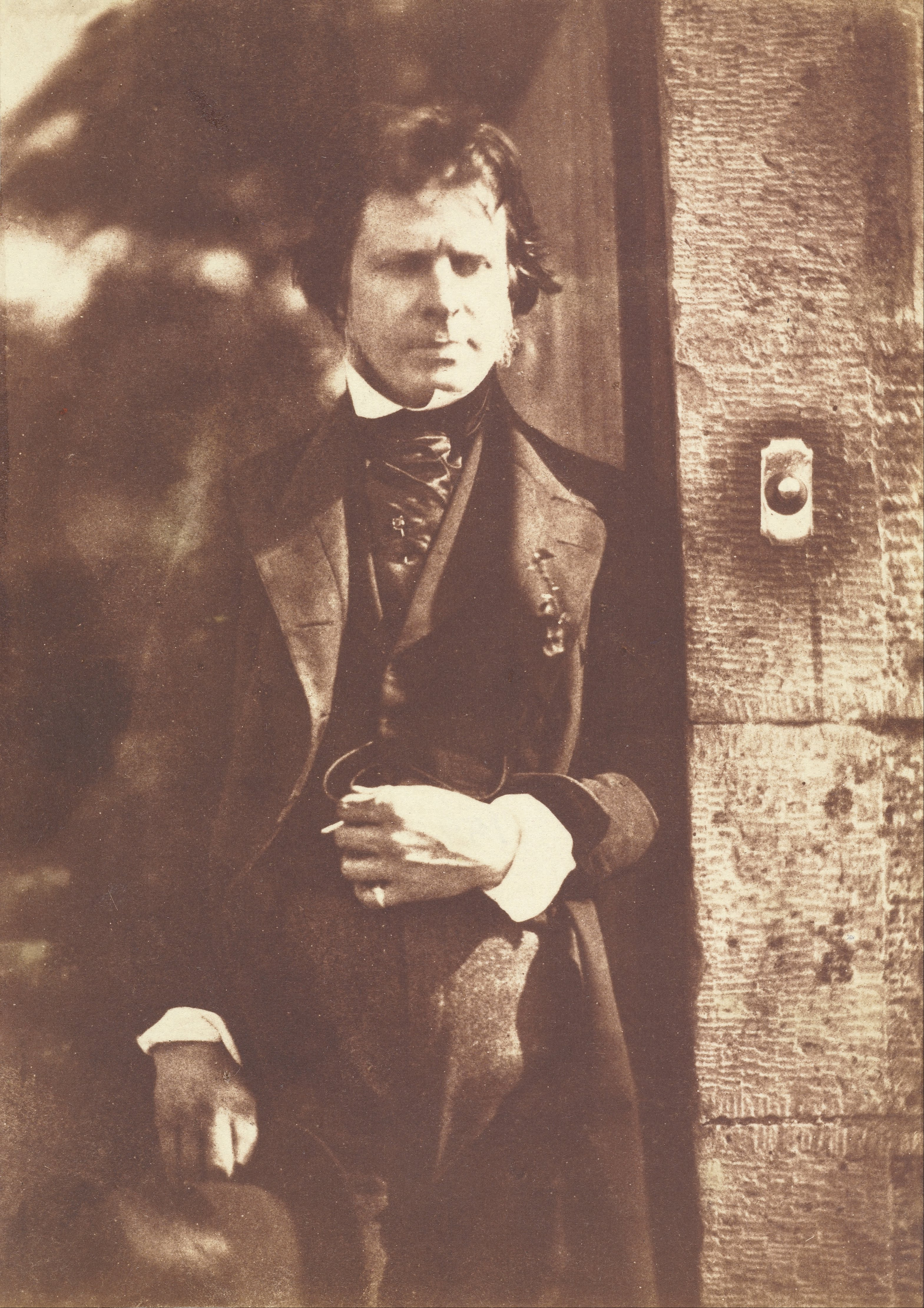
David Octavius Hill

David Octavius Hill (20 May 1802 – 17 May 1870) was a Scottish painter, photographer and arts activist. He formed Hill & Adamson studio with the engineer and photographer Robert Adamson between 1843 and 1847 to pioneer many aspects of photography in Scotland.

== Early life ==
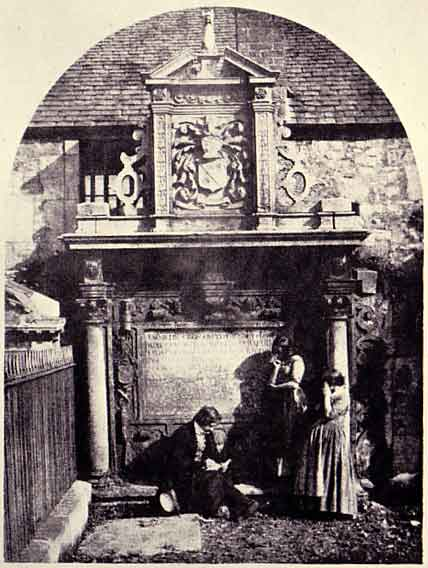
Hill sketching in Greyfriars Kirkyard (1848).

Hill was born in 1802 in Perth. His father, a bookseller and publisher, helped to re-establish Perth Academy and David was educated there as were his brothers. When his older brother Alexander joined the publishers Blackwood's in Edinburgh, Hill went there to study at the School of Design. He learned lithography and produced Sketches of Scenery in Perthshire which was published as an album of views. His landscape paintings were shown in the Institution for the Promotion of the Fine Arts in Scotland, and he was among the artists dissatisfied with the Institution who established a separate Scottish Academy in 1829 with the assistance of his close friend Henry Cockburn. A year later Hill took on unpaid secretarial duties. He sought commissions in book illustration, with four sketches being used to illustrate The Glasgow and Garnkirk Railway Prospectus in 1832, and went on to provide illustrations for editions of Walter Scott and Robert Burns.

In the 1830s he is listed as living at 24 Queen Street, in Edinburgh's New Town. In 1836 the Royal Scottish Academy began to pay him a salary as secretary, and with this security he married his fiancée Ann Macdonald the following year. After the birth of their daughter, Charlotte Hill, Ann was invalided, and died on 5 October 1841, aged 36, and was buried with her family in Greyfriars Churchyard in Perth.

He continued to produce illustrations and to paint landscapes on commission. During this period he lived at 28 Inverleith Row in Edinburgh's northern suburbs. Hill moved to "Calton Hill Stairs" in 1850.

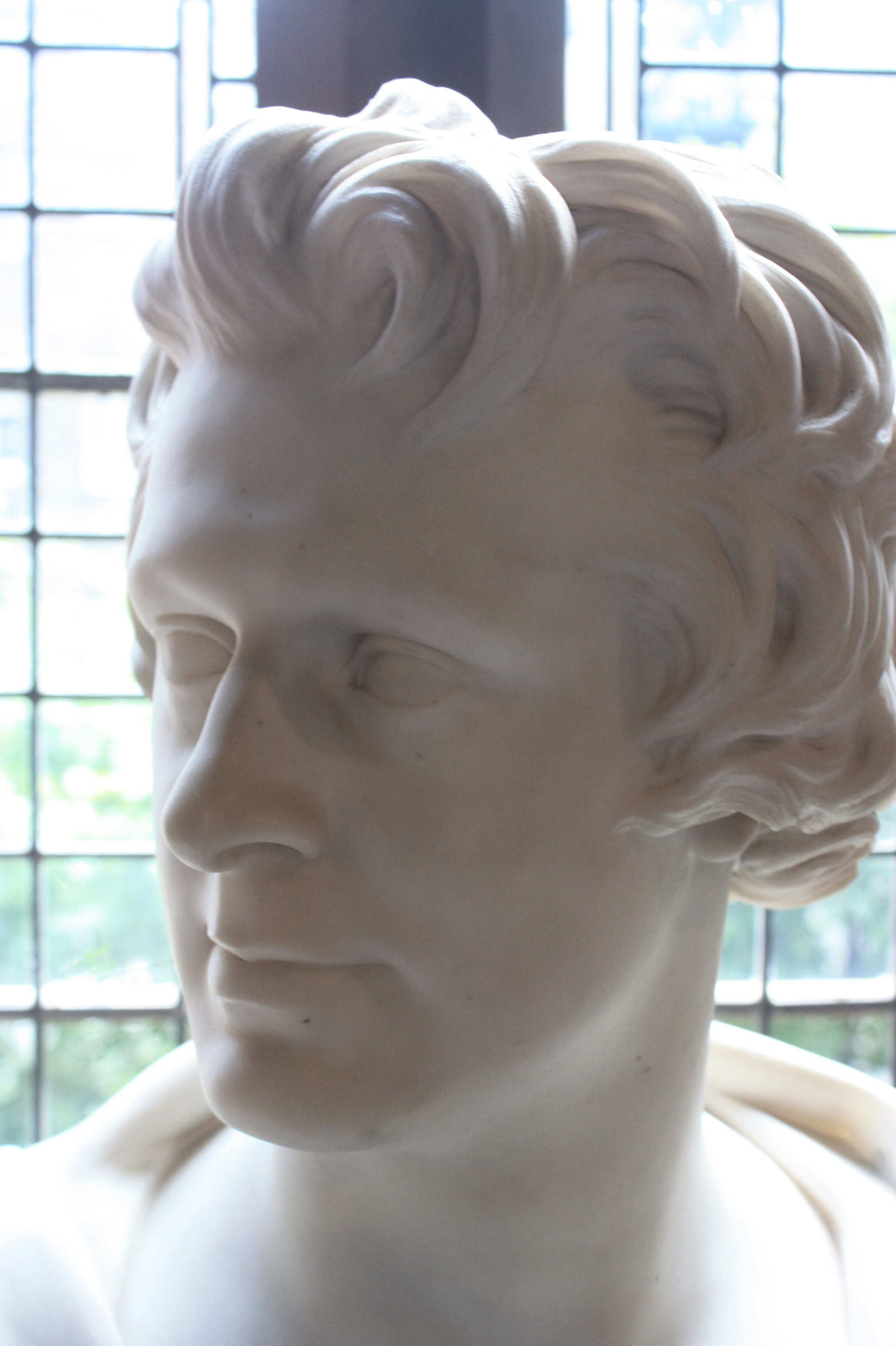
Hill sculpted by Patric Park, 1842

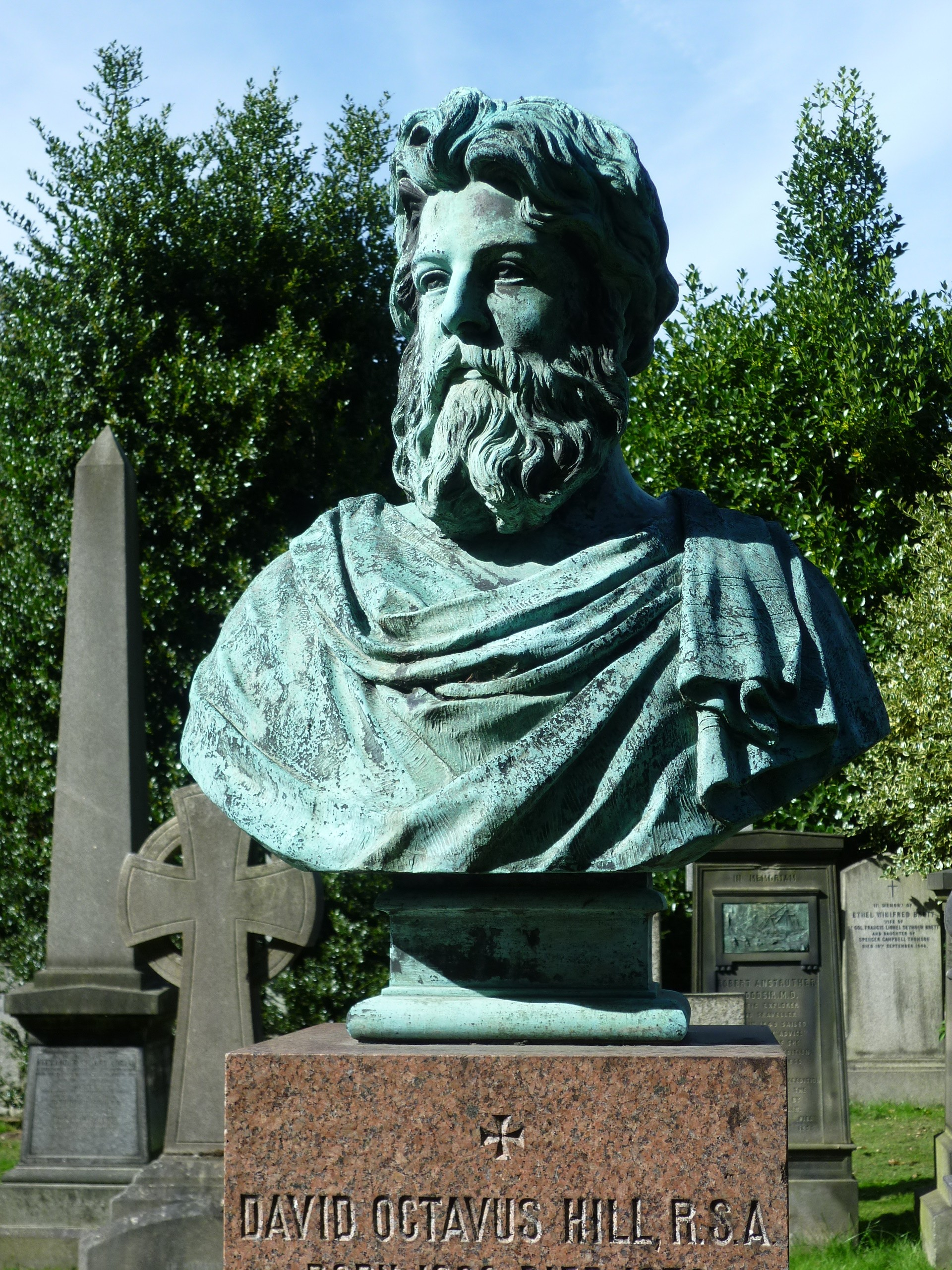
Bust on Hill's grave

== Free Church of Scotland ==
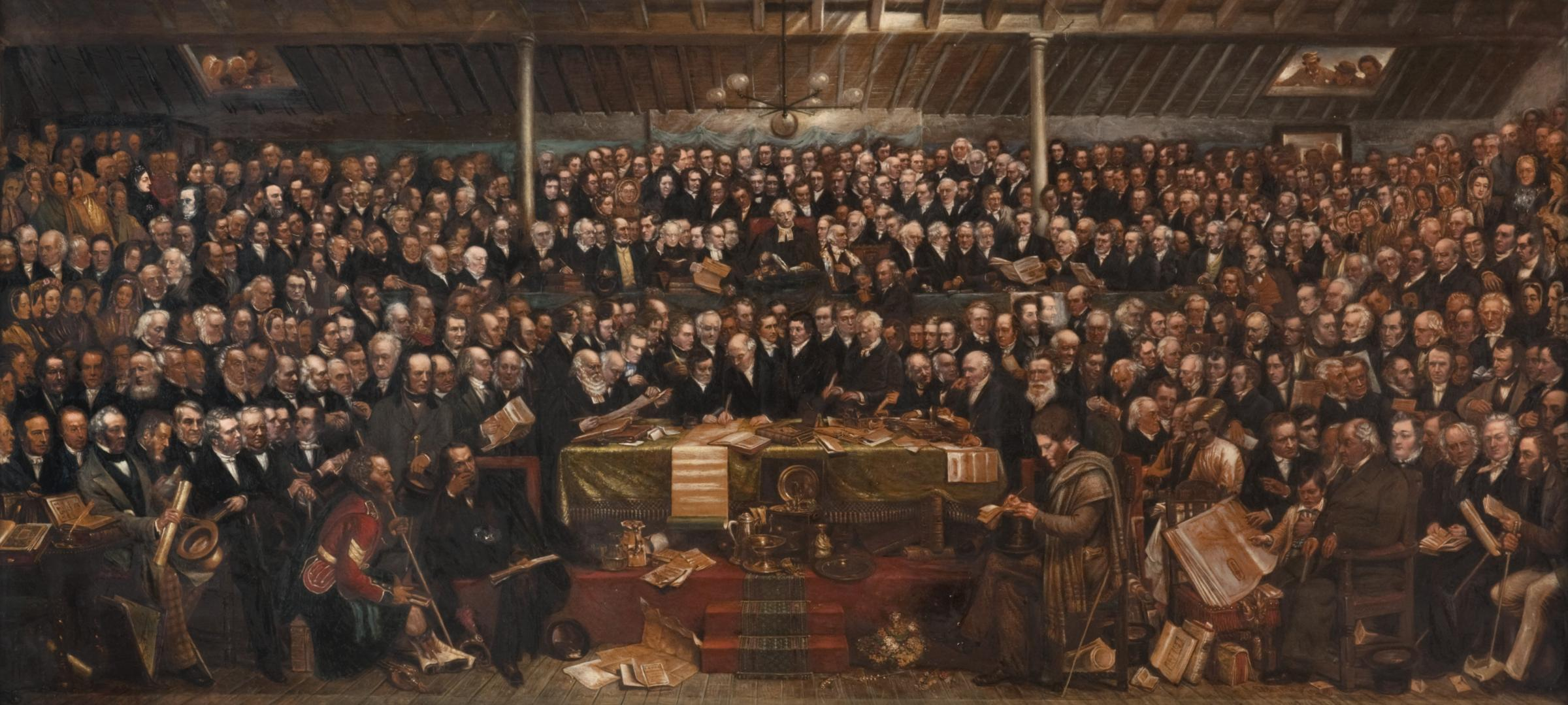
The Disruption of 1843 was painted by Hill.

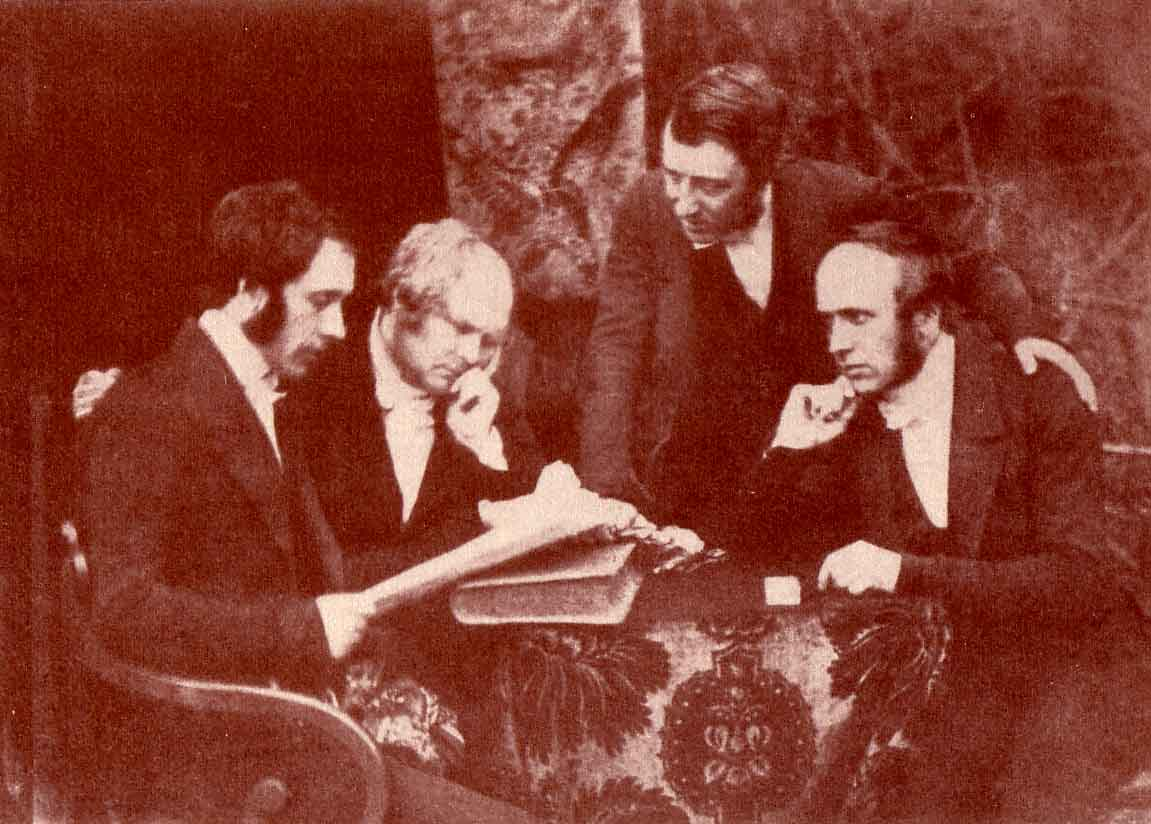
Clergymen who had been at the Assembly, photographed at Dumbarton Presbytery in 1845 as the basis for their portraits in the top left row of the painting.

Hill was present at the Disruption Assembly in 1843 when over 450 ministers walked out of the Church of Scotland assembly and down to another assembly hall to found the Free Church of Scotland. He decided to record the dramatic scene with the encouragement of his friend Lord Cockburn and another spectator, the physicist Sir David Brewster who suggested using the new invention, photography, to get likenesses of all the ministers present. Brewster was himself experimenting with this technology which only dated back to 1839, and he introduced Hill to another enthusiast, Robert Adamson. Hill and Adamson took a series of photographs of those who had been present and of the setting. The 5 feet (1.5 m) x 11.4 feet (3.5 m) painting was eventually completed in 1866.

== Photography studio ==
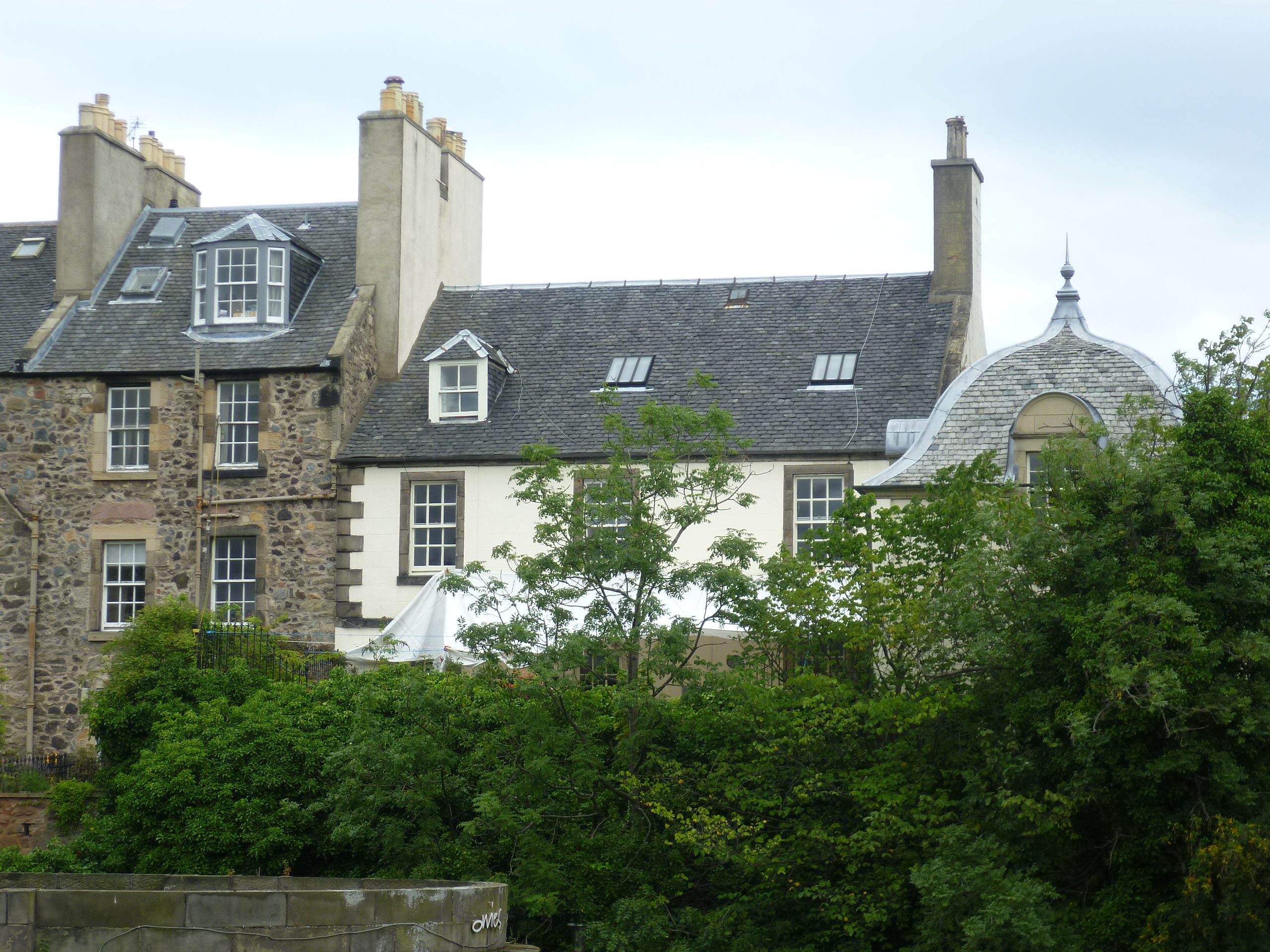
Rock House (centre)

Their collaboration, with Hill providing skill in composition and lighting, and Adamson considerable sensitivity and dexterity in handling the camera, proved extremely successful, and they soon broadened their subject matter. Adamson's studio, Rock House, on Calton Hill in Edinburgh became the centre of their photographic experiments. Using the calotype process, they produced a wide range of portraits depicting well-known Scottish luminaries of the time, including Hugh Miller, both in the studio and outdoors, often amongst the elaborate tombs in Greyfriars Kirkyard.

They photographed local and Fife landscapes and urban scenes, including images of the Scott Monument under construction in Edinburgh. Their subjects ranged from prominent figures to working-class people, particularly the fishermen of Newhaven and the fishwives who transported fish in creels to Edinburgh to sell. They also produced several photographs of soldiers in motion and a well-known image of two priests walking side by side.

Their partnership produced around 3,000 prints, but was cut short after only four years due to the ill health and death of Adamson in 1848. The calotypes faded under sunlight, so had to be kept in albums, and though Hill continued the studio for some months, he became less active and abandoned the studio, though he continued to sell prints of the photographs and to use them as an aid for composing paintings.

In this period, Hill and Adamson had been assisted by Jessie Mann, a childhood friend of Hill's from Perth. It is probable she worked on photographic processing and printing. She is considered to have taken a portrait of King Frederick II of Saxony in 1844 while Hill and Adamson were unavailable. She is "a strong candidate as the first Scottish woman photographer" and one of the first women anywhere to be involved in photography. Mann worked with Hill and Adamson until the studio closed after Adamson's death.

== Later life and death ==
In 1862 he remarried, to the sculptor Amelia Robertson Hill, 20 years his junior, and around that time took up photography again, but the results were more static and less successful than his collaboration with Adamson. He was badly affected by the death of his daughter and his work slowed. In 1866 he finished the Disruption picture which received wide acclaim, though many of the participants had died by then. The photographer F.C. Annan produced fine reduced facsimiles of the painting for sale throughout the Free Church, and a group of subscribers raised £1,200 to buy the painting for the church. In 1869 illness forced him to give up his post as secretary to the RSA, and he died in May 1870.

Hill is buried in Dean Cemetery, Edinburgh―one of the finest Victorian cemeteries in Scotland―alongside his second wife, Amelia Robertson Hill. A bronze bust sculpted by Robertson Hill sits atop his grave.

== Exhibitions ==
Some of his photographs were put on show in Glasgow in 1954 but the first major exhibition of his work was in 1963 in Essen, Germany.

Photographs

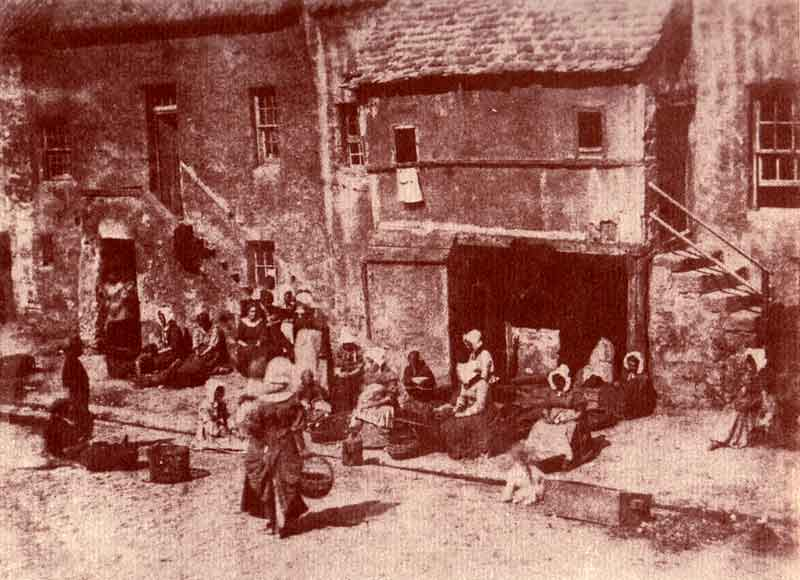
Fishwives in St Andrews bait their lines, 1844

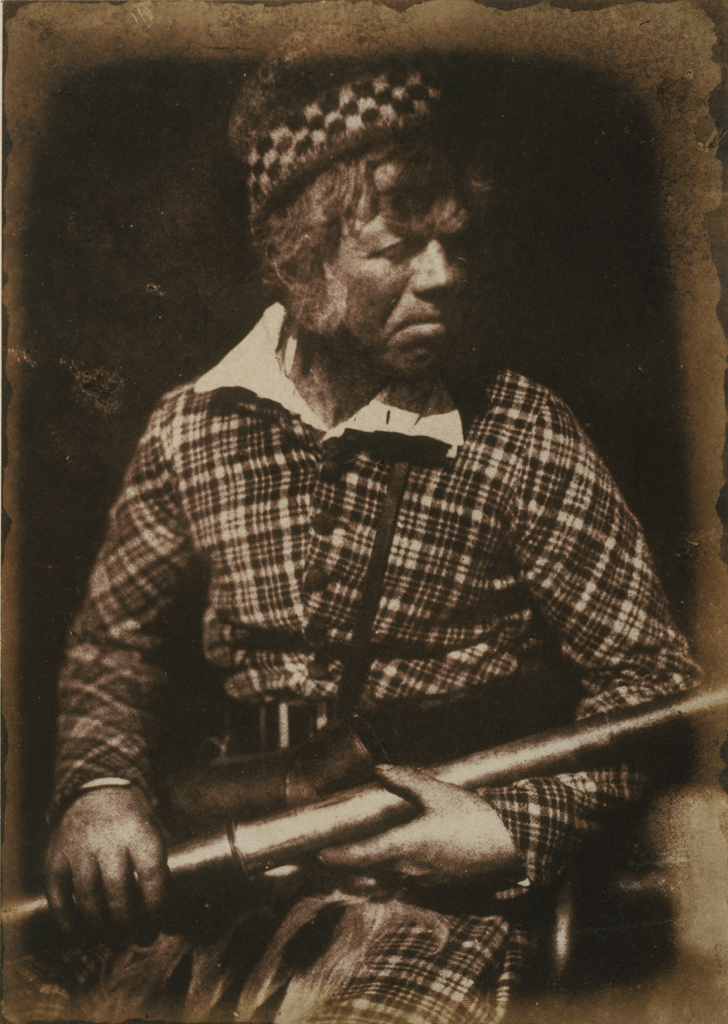
Finlay, deer stalker, 1845

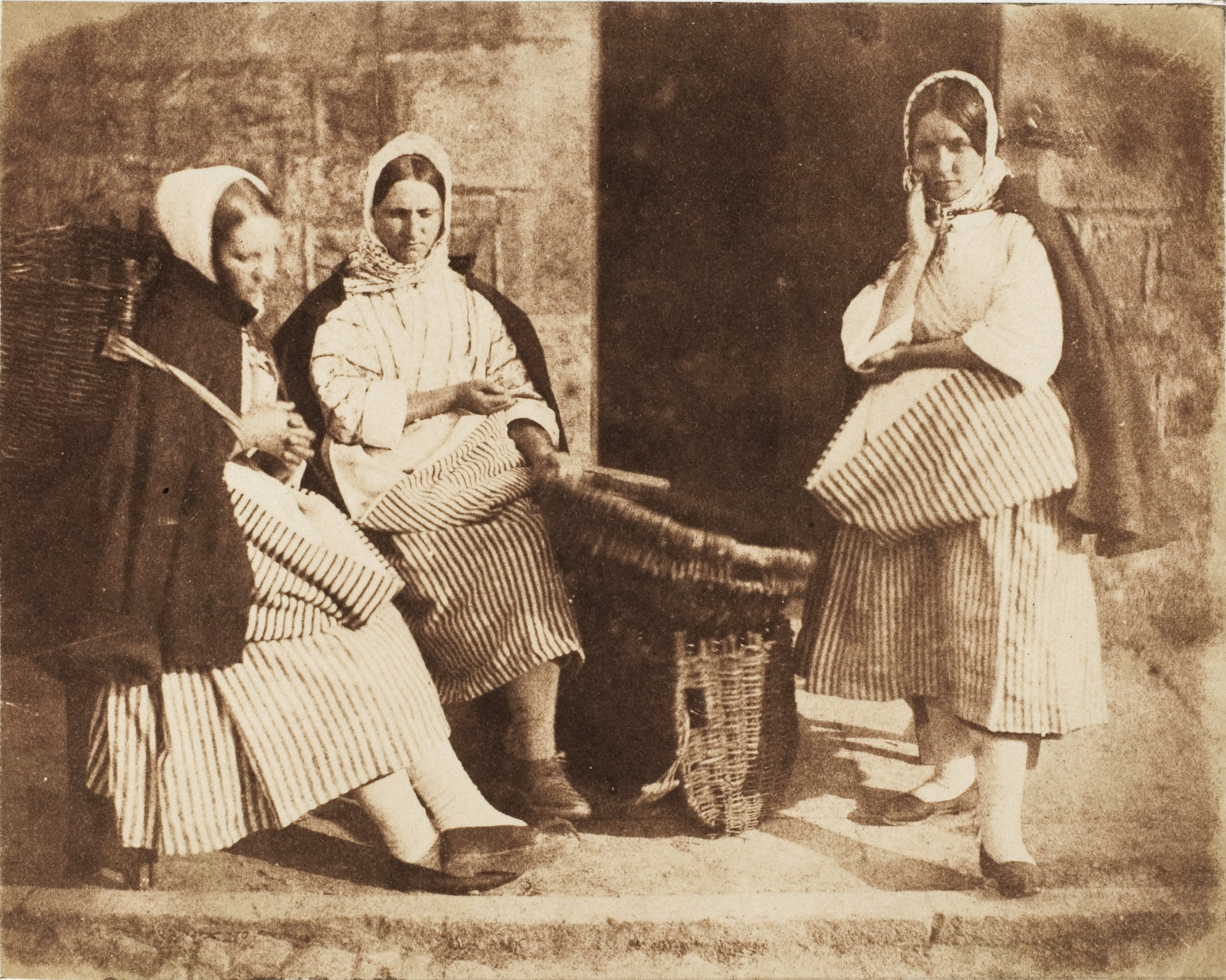
Newhaven fishergirls (between 1843 and 1847)
Paintings

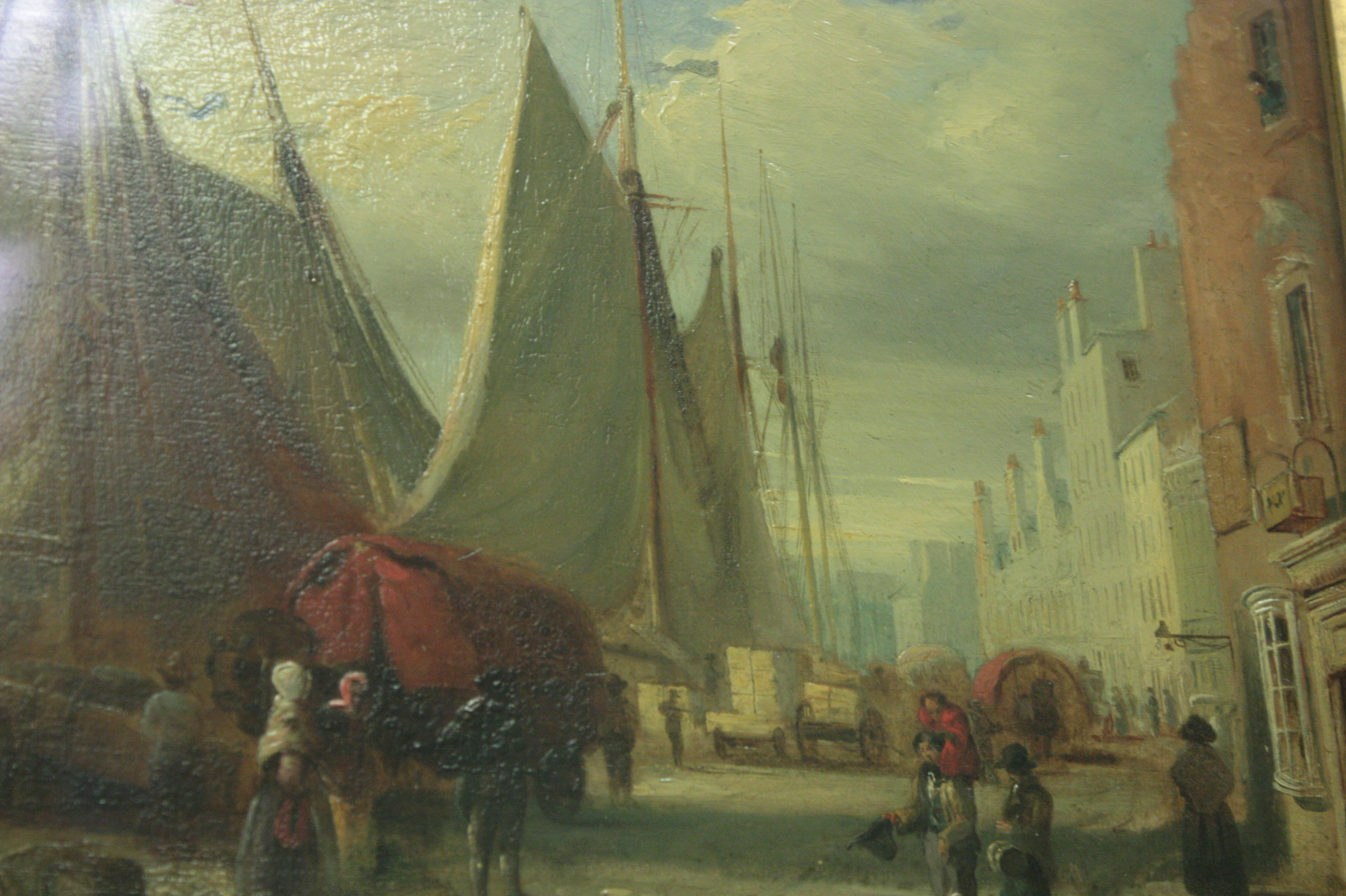
The Pier at Leith, painted by Hill c.1860

== In fiction ==
Hill features as a character in Sara Sheridan's novel The Secrets of Blythswood Square (2022) set in 1846. In the book, Hill and Adamson's fictional assistant, Ellory Mann (sister of the real-life Jessie) sets up her own photographic studio in Glasgow.
