= George Ogilvy Reid =

Scottish artist

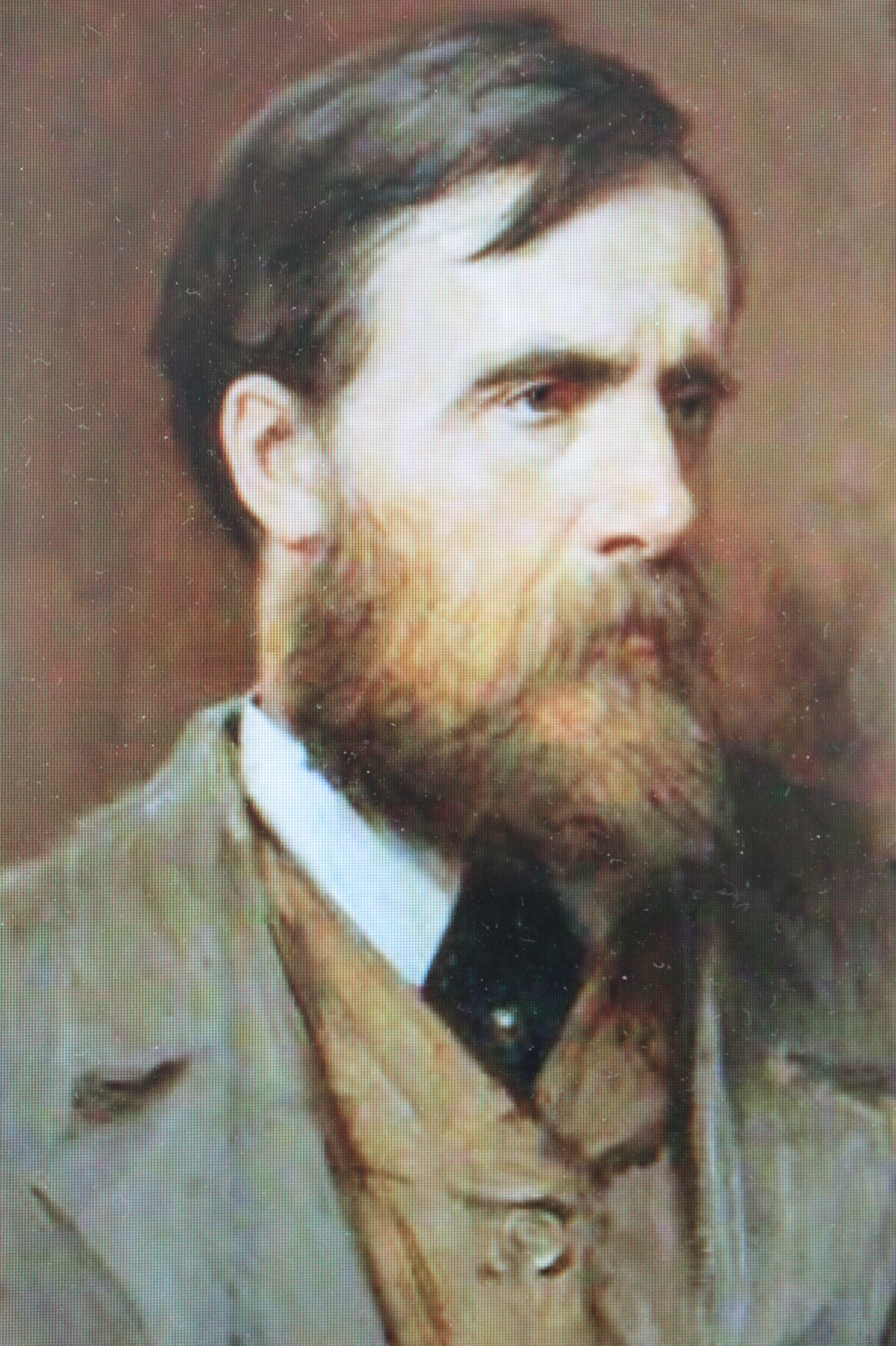
- George Ogilvy Reid, self-portrait
- Born: 19 September 1851; Leith, Scotland
- Died: 11 April 1928 (aged 76); Edinburgh, Scotland

George Ogilvy Reid (19 September 1851- 11 April 1928) was a Scottish landscape and portrait artist operating in the late 19th and early 20th century. He lived his entire life in Leith, the harbour area of Edinburgh.

== Life ==
Born in Leith in 1851, he originally studied to be an engraver.

He later studied art at the Trustee’s Academy on Picardy Place (the forerunner of the Edinburgh College of Art).

In October 1891 he received a Royal Commission to paint the baptism of Queen Victoria’s grandchild, Prince Maurice of Battenburg. At this time he was living in a flat at 12 Warrender Park Terrace and had a studio at 20 George Street in the New Town in Edinburgh.

In 1896 he was sculpted by David Watson Stevenson.

In 1911 he was living at 11 Carlton Street in Stockbridge, Edinburgh and had studios at the Synod Hall on Castle Terrace.

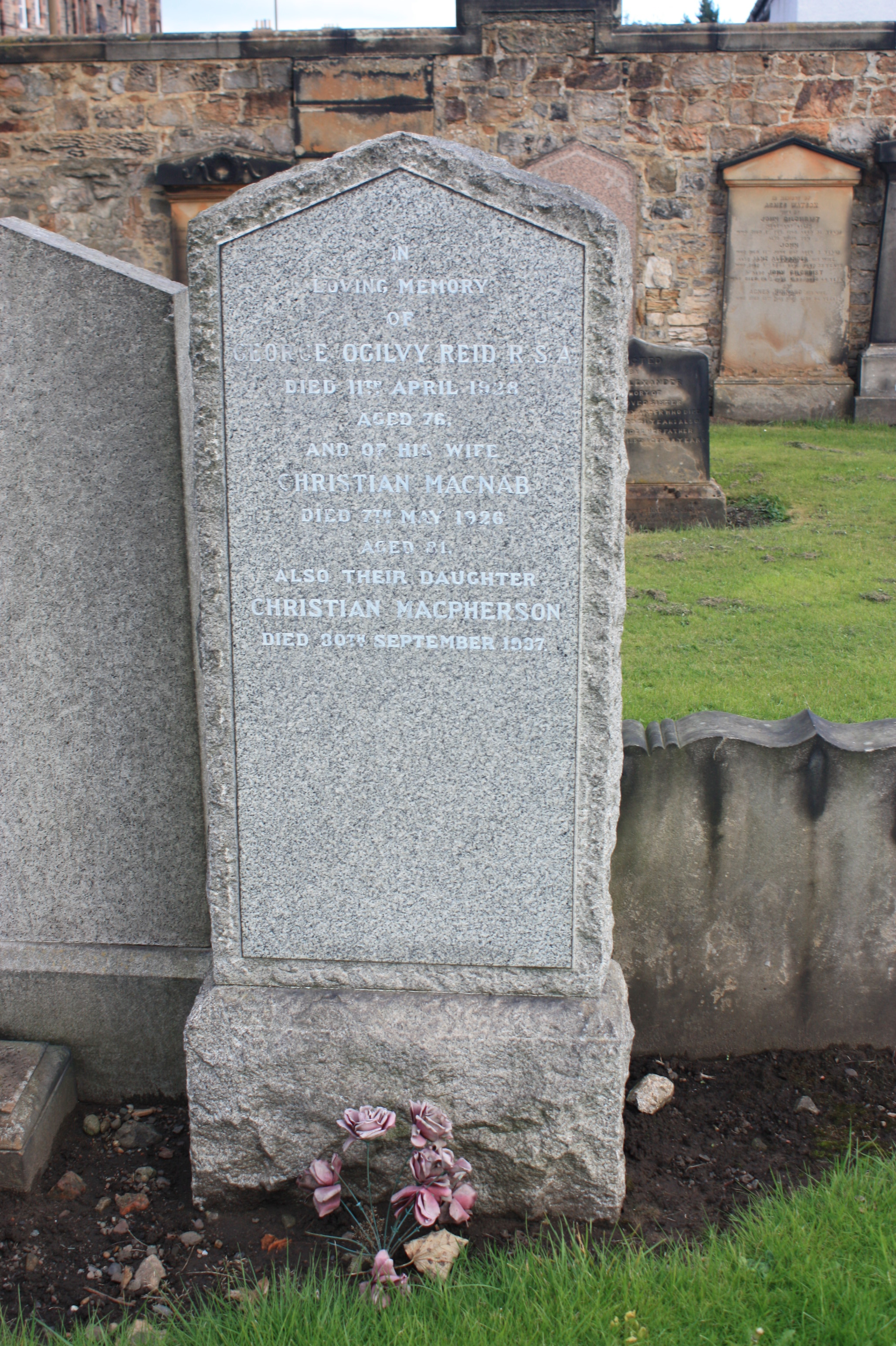
The grave of George Ogilvy Reid, Rosebank Cemetery

He died on 11 April 1928. He is buried near the north-west corner of Rosebank Cemetery in Edinburgh with his wife, Christian MacNab. Their daughter, Christian MacPherson Reid (d.1937) also lies with them.

== Works ==
- James Russell, First Provost of Motherwell (1865-8), North Lanarkshire Council Collection
- A. Blair Spence (1814-1895), Dundee Art Gallery
- Standing Female Nude with Long Brown Hair, Edinburgh College of Art
- The Baptism of Prince Maurice (sketch), National Gallery of Scotland
- Self Portrait (1882), Gordon Highlanders Museum
- Queen Victoria (oil sketch, 1891), National Gallery of Scotland
- Prince Henry of Battenburg (oil sketch, 1891), Royal Scottish Academy
- Princess Beatrice of Battenburgh (oil sketch, 1891), Royal Scottish Academy
- Prince Alexander of Battenburg (oil sketch, 1891), Royal Scottish Academy
- Princess Victoria Eugenie of Battenburg (oil sketch, 1891), Royal Scottish Academy
- The Baptism of Prince Maurice (1892), Scottish National Portrait Gallery
- After Killiecrankie, the Death of Claverhouse (1897), Royal Scottish Academy
- 1914- The Belgians on the March, Glasgow Museums
