= Hill & Adamson =

First photography studio in Scotland

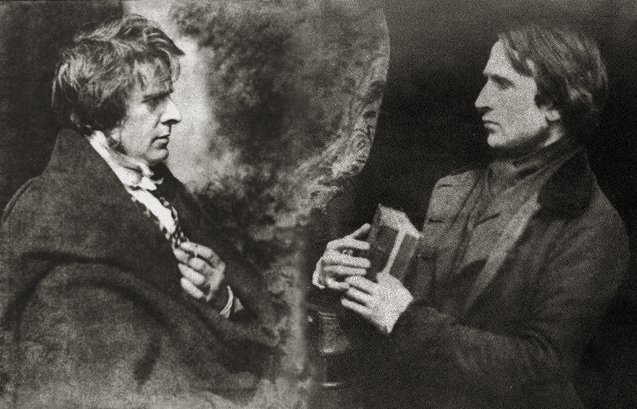
- Composite photograph of Hill (left) and Adamson, both c. 1845
- Formation: 1843
- Dissolved: 1848
- Purpose: Photography studio, producing salt prints from calotype negatives
- Location: Rock House on Calton Hill, Edinburgh, Scotland
- Coordinates: 55.954361°N 3.185335°W
- Key people: David Octavius Hill; Robert Adamson
- Affiliations: David Brewster

Hill & Adamson was the first photography studio in Scotland, set up by painter David Octavius Hill and engineer Robert Adamson in 1843. During their brief partnership that ended with Adamson's untimely death, Hill & Adamson produced "the first substantial body of self-consciously artistic work using the newly invented medium of photography." Watercolorist John Harden, on first seeing Hill & Adamson's calotypes in November 1843, wrote, "The pictures produced are as Rembrandt's but improved, so like his style & the oldest & finest masters that doubtless a great progress in Portrait painting & effect must be the consequence."

== Free Church of Scotland ==
Hill was present at the Disruption Assembly in 1843 when over 450 ministers walked out of the Church of Scotland assembly and down to another assembly hall to found the Free Church of Scotland. He decided to record the dramatic scene with the encouragement of his friend Lord Cockburn and another spectator, the physicist Sir David Brewster who suggested using the new invention, photography, to get likenesses of all the ministers present. Brewster was himself experimenting with this technology which only dated back to 1839, and he introduced Hill to another enthusiast, Robert Adamson. Hill & Adamson took a series of photographs of those who had been present and of the setting. The 5-foot x 11-foot 4 inches (1.53m x 3.45m) painting was eventually completed in 1866.

== Photography studio ==
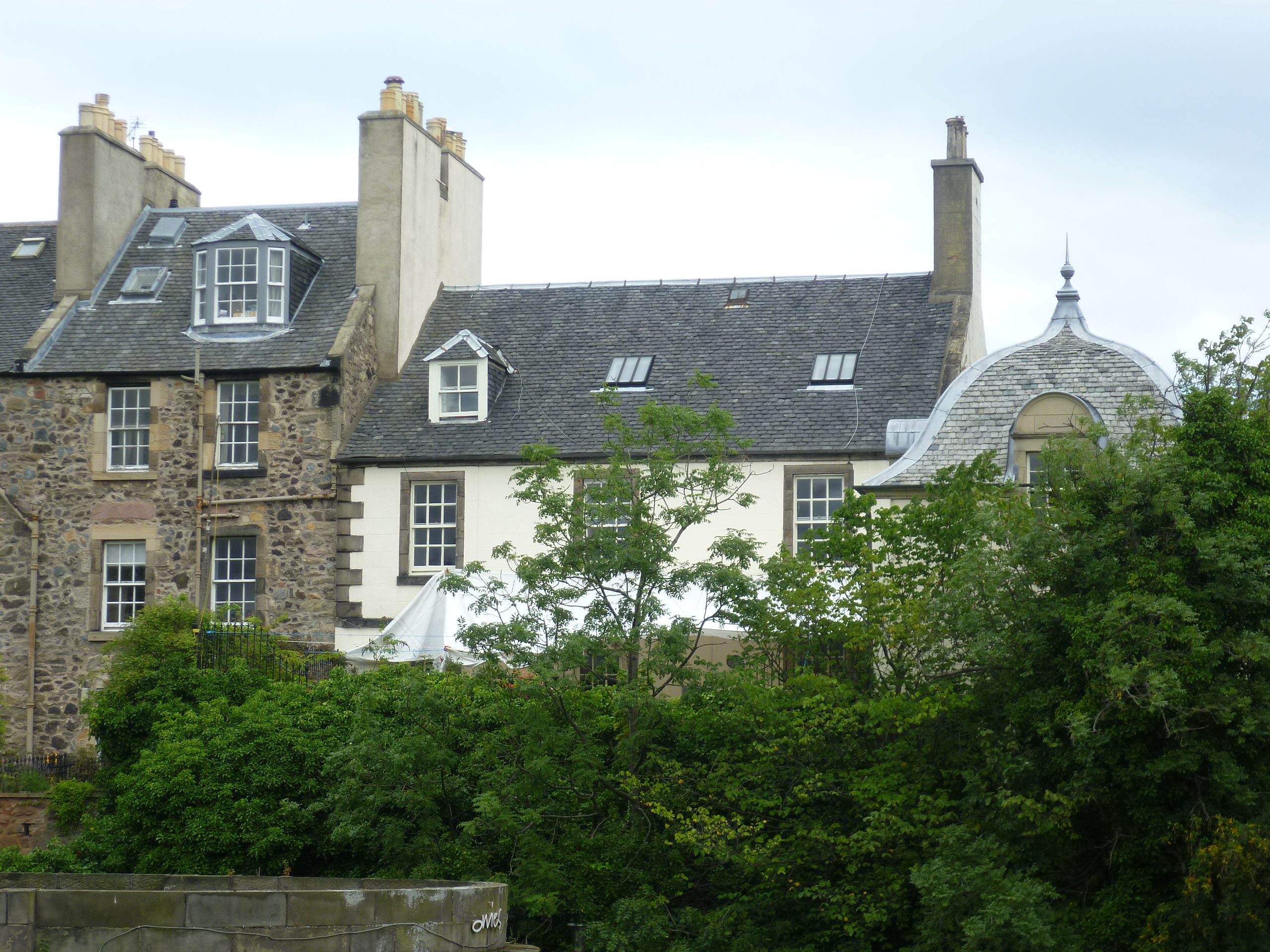
Rock House was home to Hill & Adamson's studio

Their collaboration, with Adamson providing skill in composition and lighting, and Hill considerable sensitivity and dexterity in handling the camera, proved extremely successful, and they soon broadened their subject matter. Adamson's studio, "Rock House", on the Calton Hill in Edinburgh became the centre of their photographic experiments. Using the calotype process, they produced a wide range of portraits depicting well-known Scottish luminaries of the time, including Hugh Miller, both in the studio and in outdoors settings, often amongst the elaborate tombs in Greyfriars Kirkyard.

They photographed local and Fife landscapes and urban scenes, including images of the Scott Monument under construction in Edinburgh. As well as the great and the good, they photographed ordinary working folk, particularly the fishermen of Newhaven, and the fishwives who carried the fish in creels the 3 miles (5 km) uphill to the city of Edinburgh to sell them round the doors, with their cry of "Caller herrin" (fresh herring).

They also produced early photographs depicting movement, including images of soldiers and a well-known photograph of two priests walking side by side.

Their partnership produced around 3,000 different photographs, but was cut short after only four years due to the ill health and untimely death of Adamson in 1848. Hill became less active and abandoned the studio after several months, but continued to sell prints of the photographs and use them as an aid for composing paintings.

They had an assistant, Jessie Mann, who worked with them for at least three years until Adamson's death. Mann is a strong candidate for being considered the first Scottish woman photographer, and was one of the first women anywhere to be involved in photography. It is thought that Mann is the person that made the photograph of the King of Saxony in 1844, taken at the studio whilst Hill and Adamson were unavailable. Mann often prepared chemistry and framed images and made exposures. A resulting print is now in the Scottish National Portrait Gallery.

== Historical re-evaluation ==
For a time, art historians often credited the duo's photographic prints to Hill alone, with some adding a minor credit of "with Adamson". Modern critics recognise the importance of each man's input in the creation and execution of their photographic work, describing Adamson's earlier solo work as having been technically capable while lacking the flair and spontaneity shown in his work with Hill, and being critical of the poor quality of Hill's later work after Adamson's death.

== Gallery ==
Selected artwork by Hill & Adamson
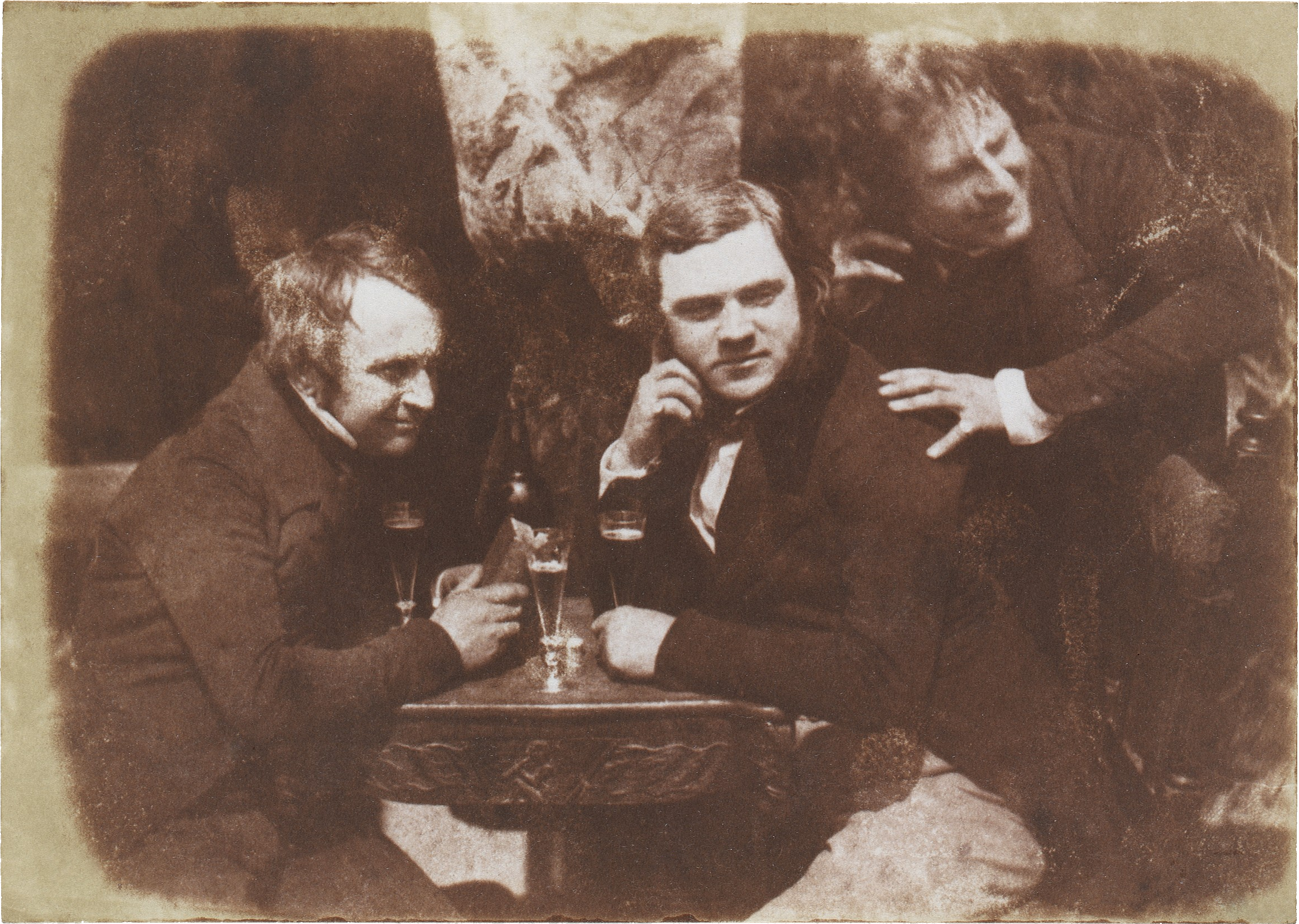
Edinburgh Ale, c1844

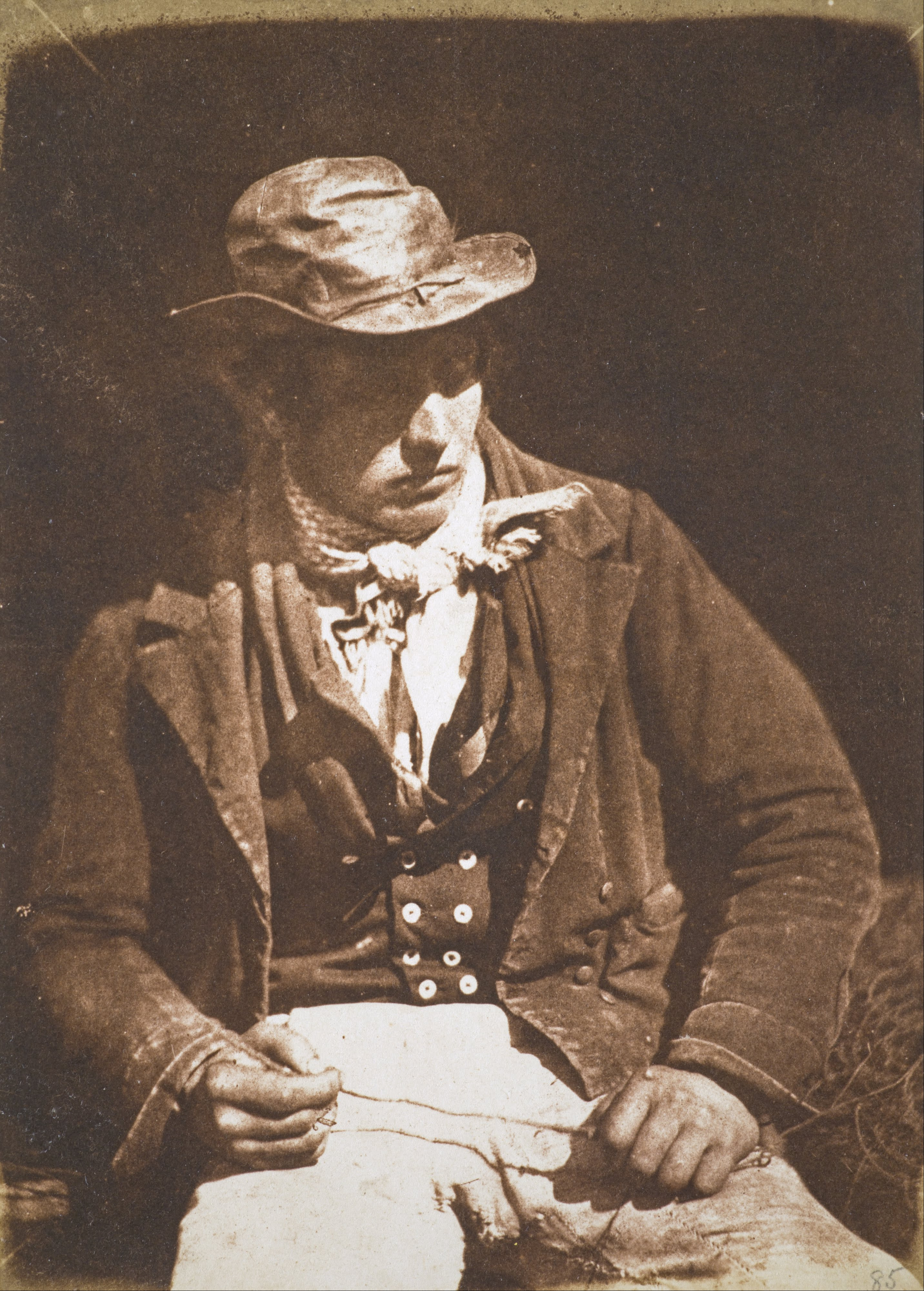
Newhaven fisherman, 1845

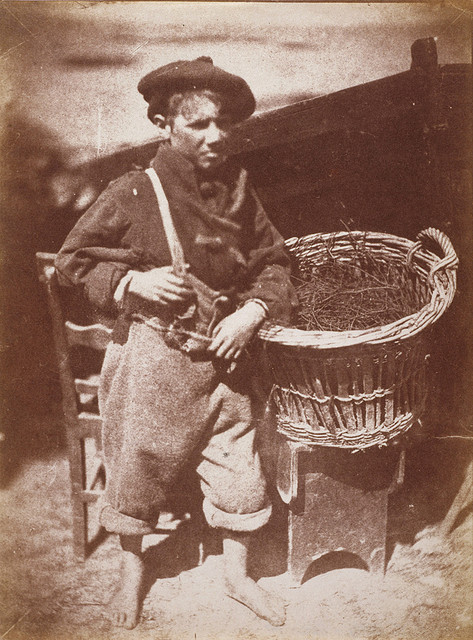
Newhaven Boy, c1845

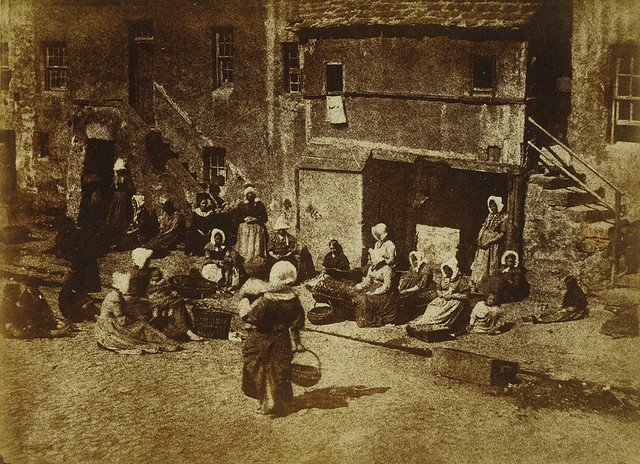
St Andrews, North Street, Fishergate, c1845

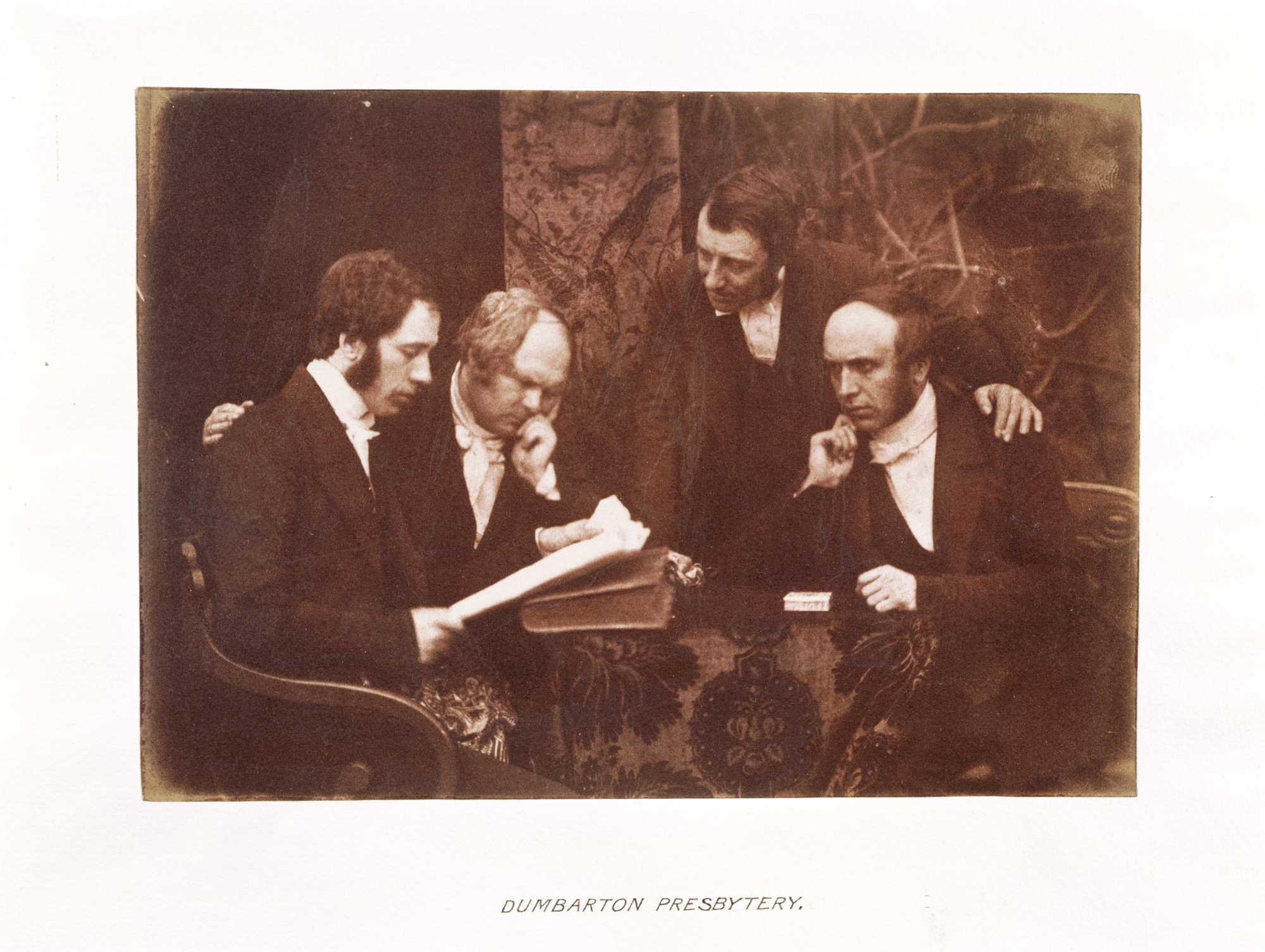
Dumbarton Presbytery, 1845, showing four ministers of the Free Church of Scotland, Princeton University Art Museum

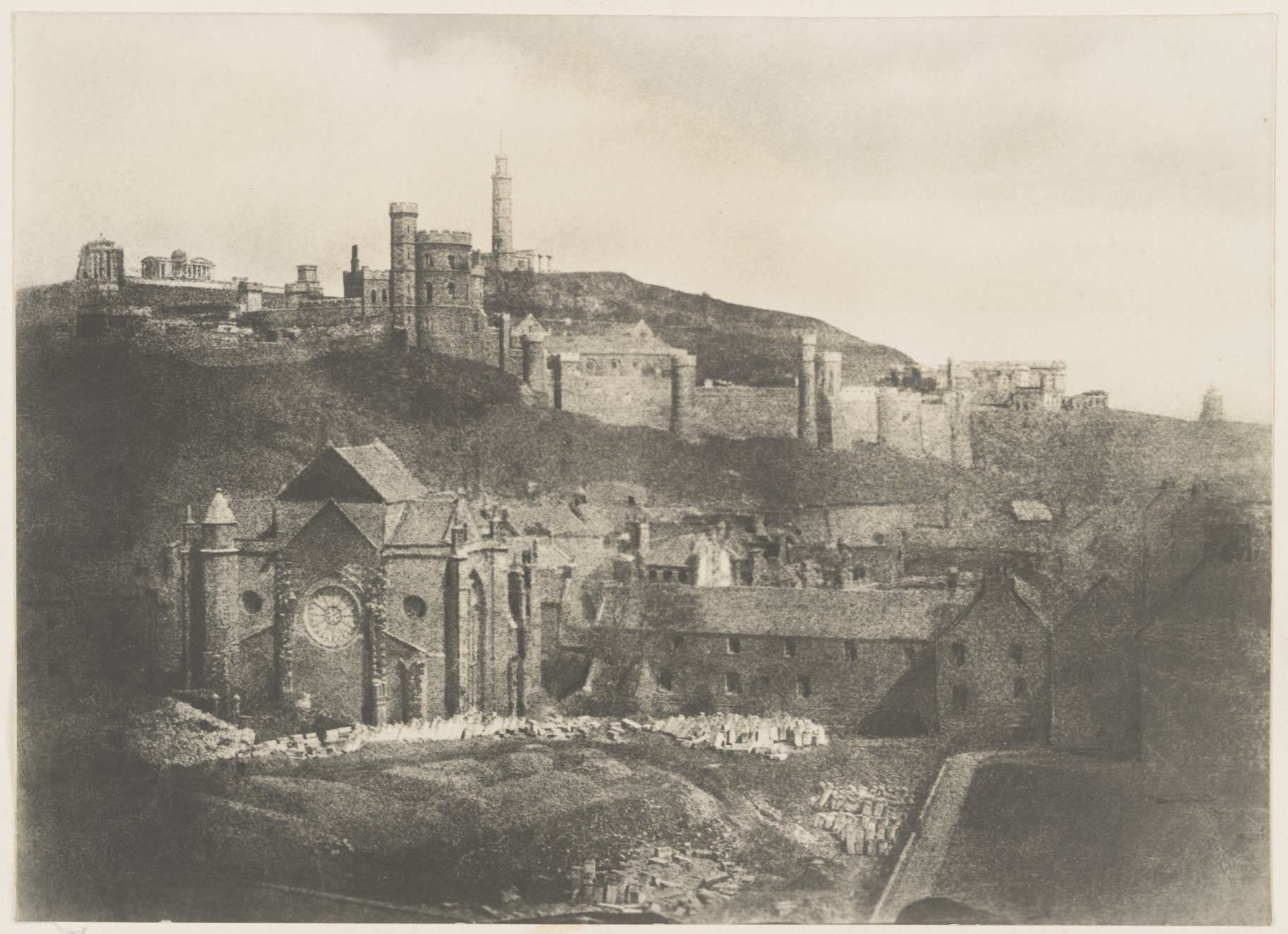
Trinity College Chapel and Hospital, with Calton Hill in the background, 1840s

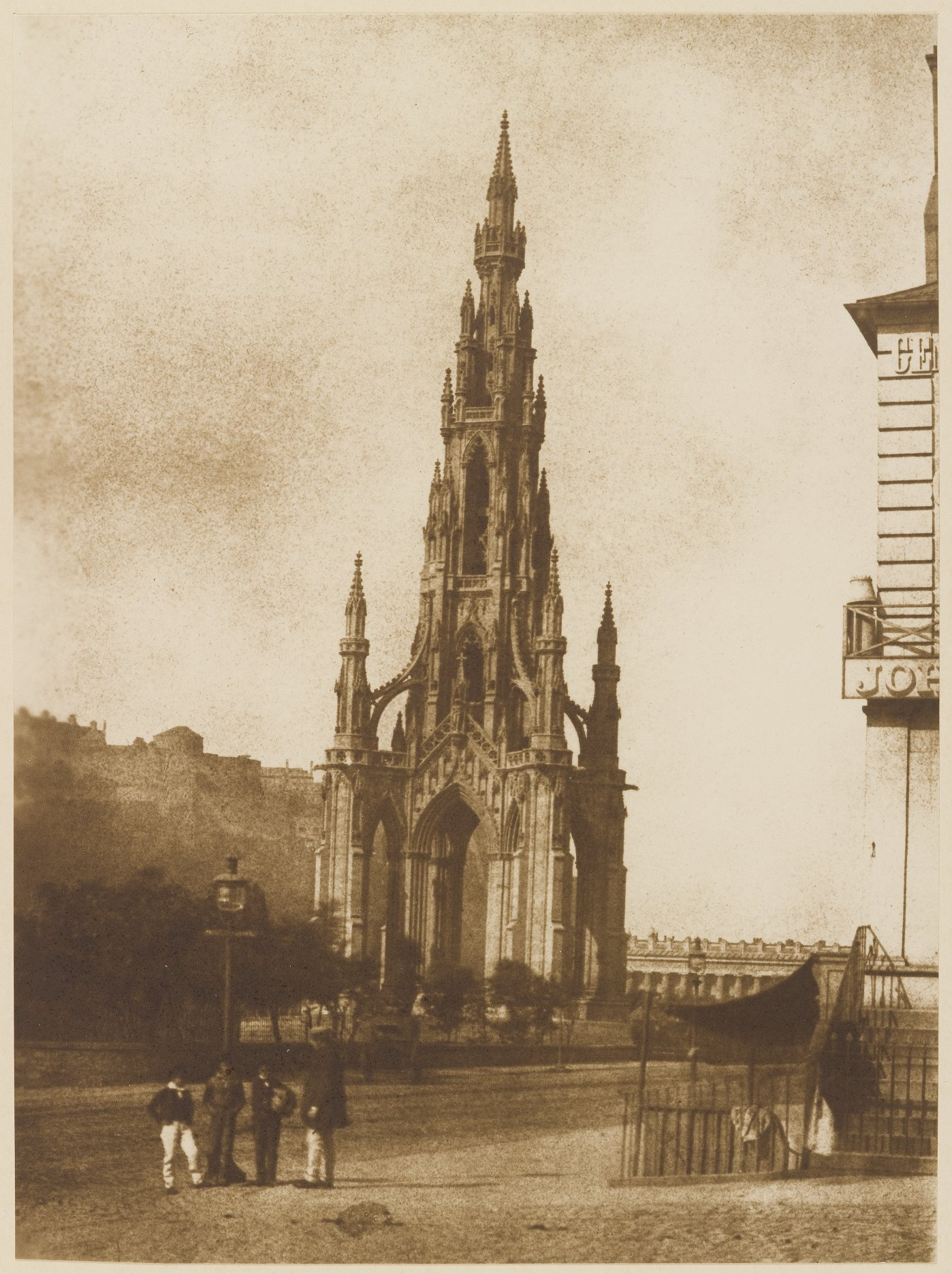
The Scott Monument (May 2, 1845)

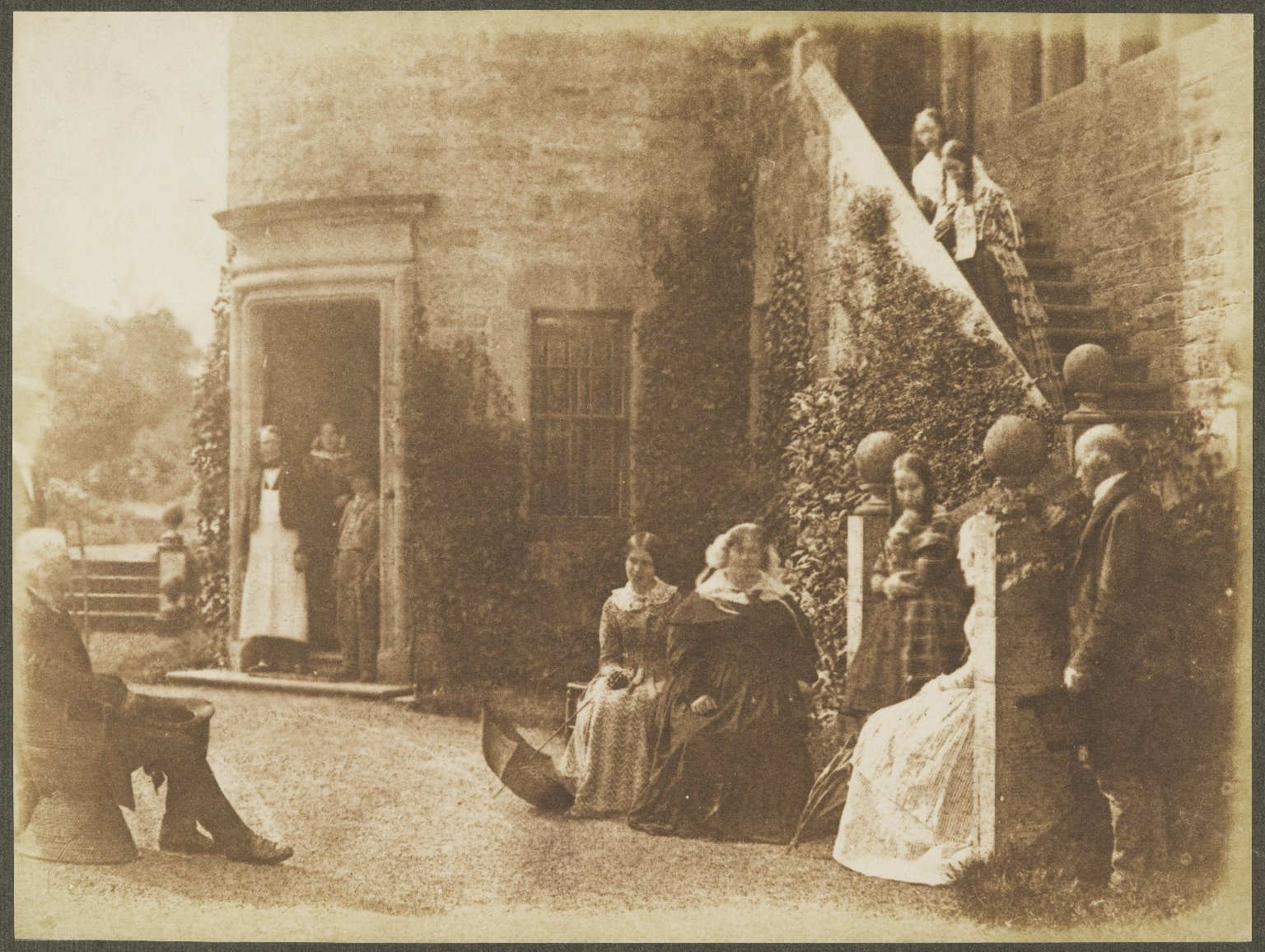
Lord Cockburn (1779-1854) Solicitor General for Scotland and Lord Rector of Glasgow University. He was involved with Hill in establishing the Royal Scottish Academy. He is pictured here at Bonaly Tower in Colinton.
