= Coulter (agriculture) =

Part of a plough that precedes the plowshare

A simple drawn plough: 4) marks the coulter (using an early knife-like design)

A coulter is a component of many ploughs that precedes the ploughshare and makes the first cut into the soil as the plough advances. It cuts a slit about 7 inches (18 cm) deep, ahead of the ploughshare. Its most effective depth is determined by soil conditions. (The name is sometimes spelled colter; the name is from the Latin 'culter' = 'knife'.)

== History ==
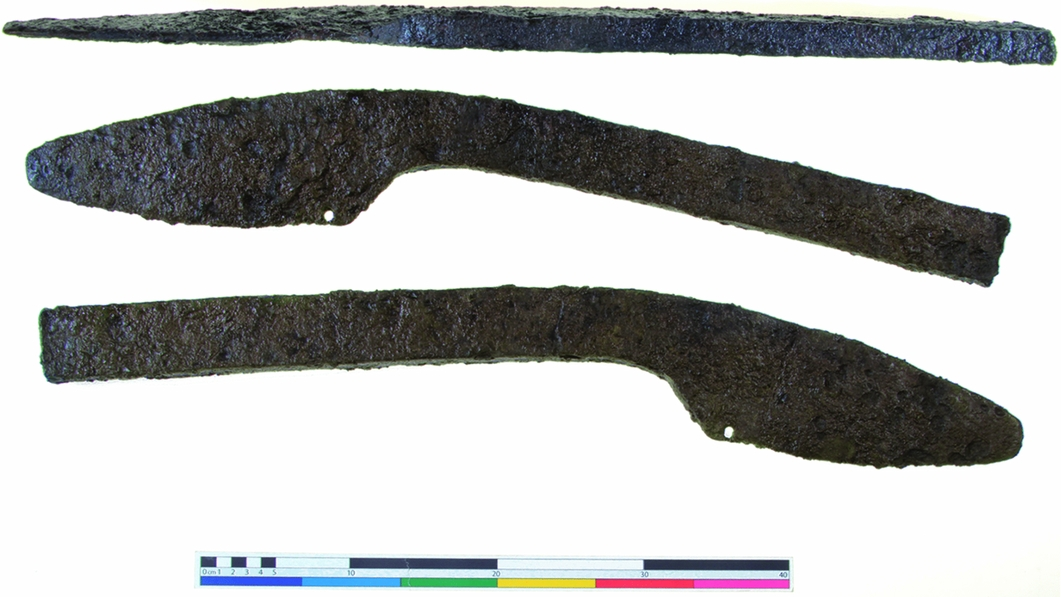
7th-century coulter used in ploughing

Its earliest design consisted of a knife-like blade. In 2011 an early medieval coulter was excavated from a site in Kent, England. Coulters using a flat rotating disc began being used c. 1900. Its advantage was a smoothly cut bank, and it sliced plant debris to the width of the furrow.

== Results ==
In his 1854 book, Henry Stephens used dynamometer measurements to conclude that a plough without a coulter took about the same amount of force to pull but using a coulter resulted in a much cleaner result. It softens the soil, allowing the plough to undercut the furrow made by the coulter.

== Jointer ==
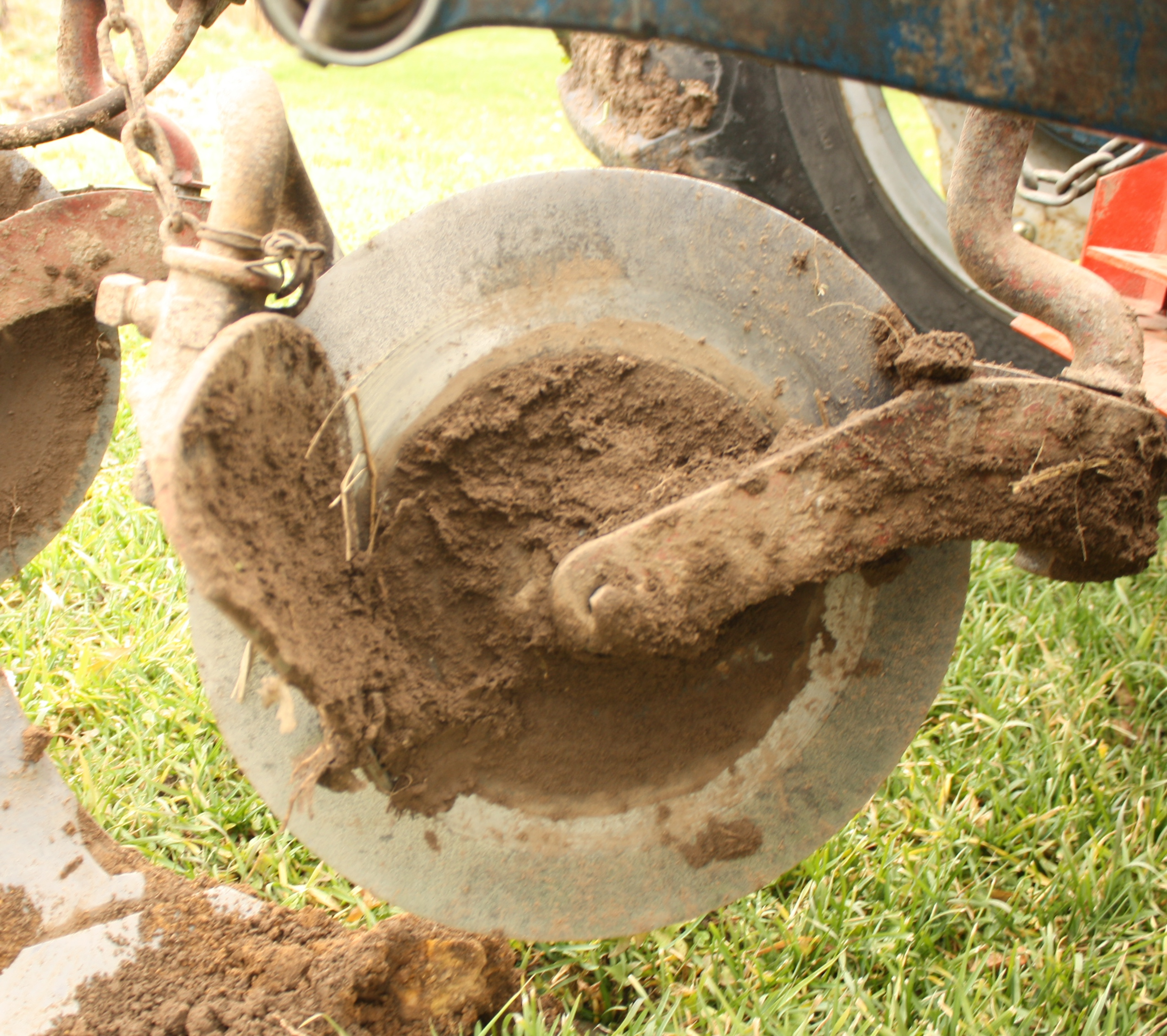
Coulter (centre) and jointer (left)

A rolling coulter has an optional accessory called a jointer. The jointer flips over a small part of the surface on top of the slice before the ploughshare flips the main slice. It ensures that all of the plant debris gets covered by the flipped slice.
