= James Campbell Irons =

Scottish lawyer, historical author and amateur geologist

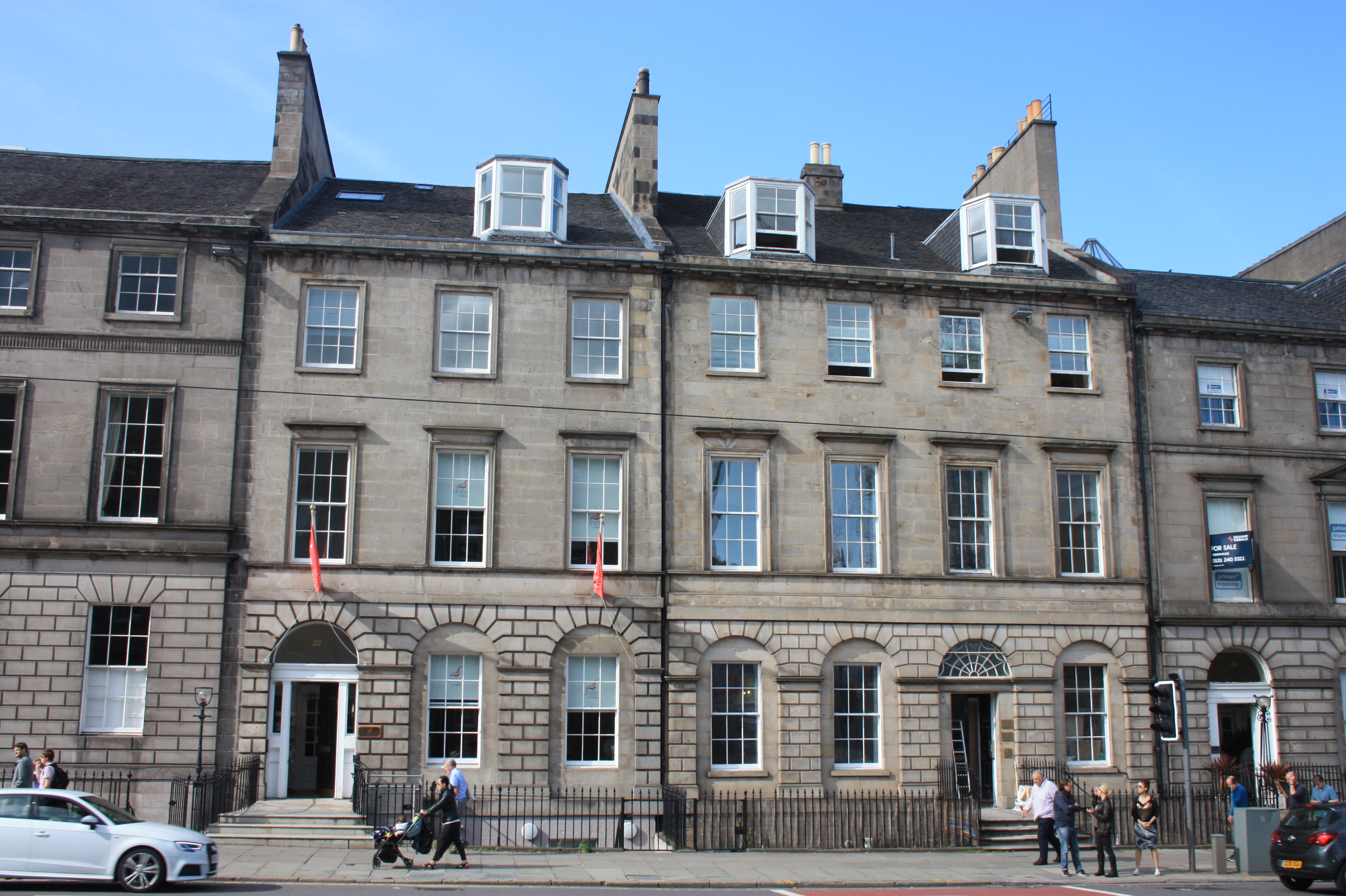
22, 24 York Place, Edinburgh

James Campbell Irons FRSE SSC (24 April 1840 – 9 September 1910) was a Scottish lawyer, historical author and amateur geologist.

== Life ==
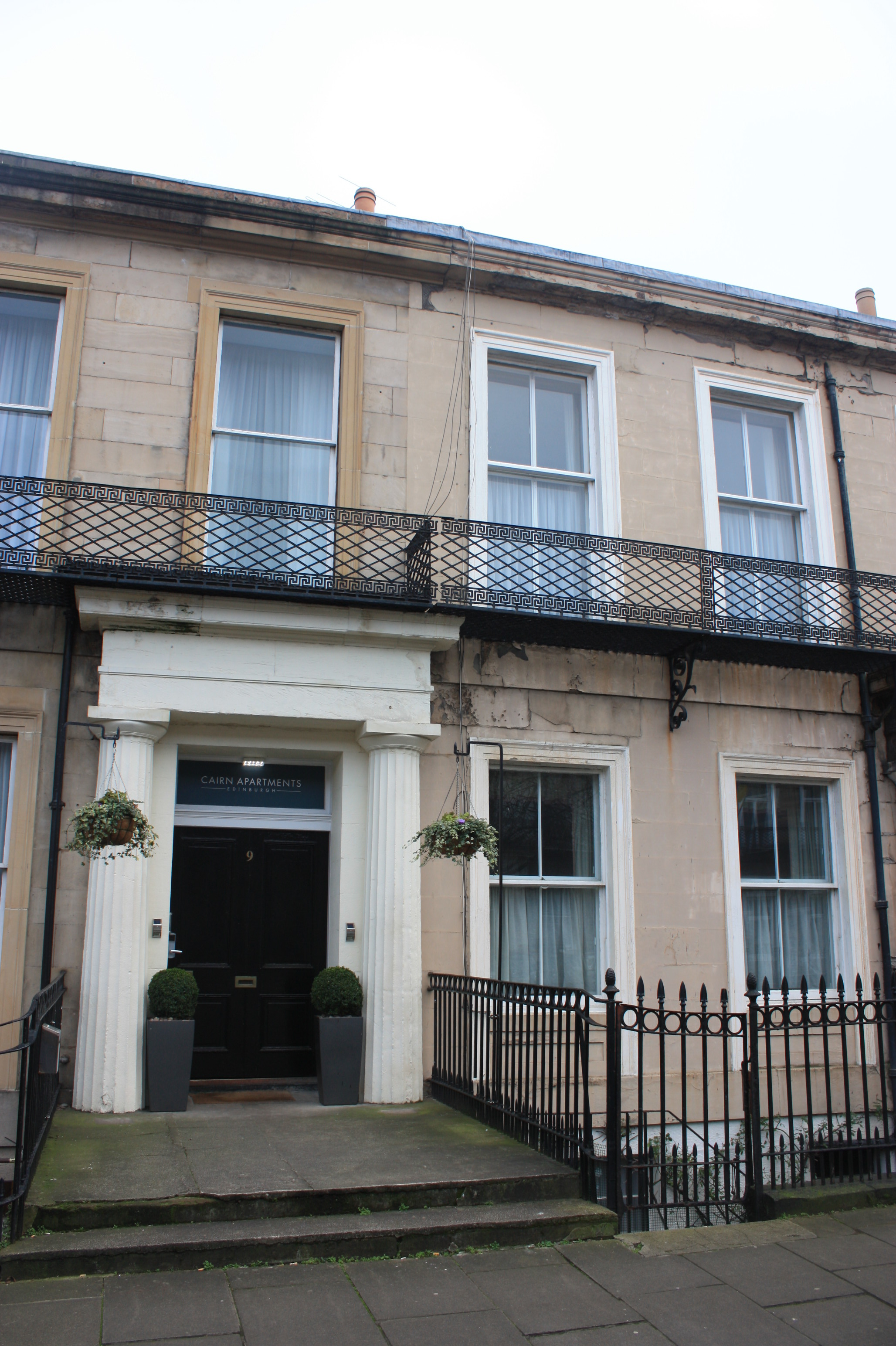
9 Windsor Street, Edinburgh

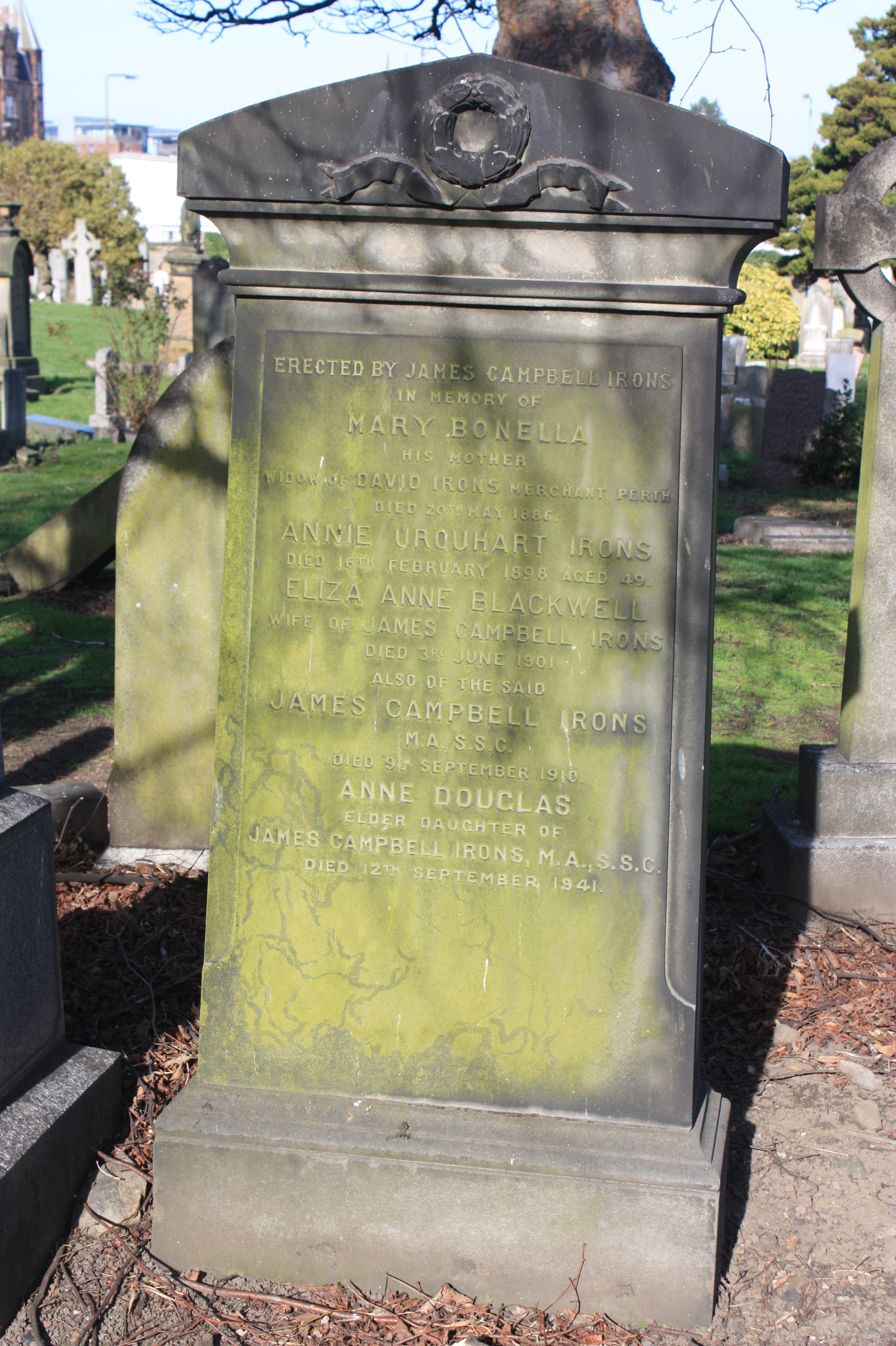
The grave of James Campbell Irons, Rosebank Cemetery, Edinburgh

He was born in Dundee on 24 April 1840, the son of David Irons and Mary Bonella. His father was a grocer and tobacconist, living and working at 59 Overgate in Dundee. He trained as a lawyer in Edinburgh and in 1864 he was appointed Depute Town Clerk of Leith. He was admitted to the Society of Solicitors in the Supreme Courts of Scotland in 1867 and practised law in the firm of Irons Roberts & Co SSC in Leith, then in the city of Edinburgh as J. Campbell Irons & Co.

In 1870, he was working as a lawyer in Leith at 19 Charlotte Street (now known as Queen Charlotte Street). He was then living at 6 Haddington Place, a relatively opulent Georgian flat near the top of Leith Walk. In 1892 he had offices at both 22 York Place in Edinburgh's First New Town plus 10 Bernard Street in Leith, whilst living at 9 Windsor Street in Edinburgh's East End. He was solicitor in Scotland for the War Office, the education Department and the Prison Commissioners.

In 1898, he was elected a Fellow of the Royal Society of Edinburgh. His proposers were Andrew Beatson Bell, John Sturgeon Mackay, James Geikie and Peter Guthrie Tait.

In 1909, his offices moved to 19 Dundas Street.

He died on 9 September 1910 and is buried in Rosebank Cemetery in north Edinburgh, just north of the Christian Salvesen monument.

== Family ==
He married Eliza Anne Blackwell (1841-1901) on 4 September 1867 and had five sons, two of whom became lawyers.

== Publications ==
- Manual of Police Law and Practice (1862)
- The Scottish Justices Manual
- The Burgh Police Act 1892 (1893)
- Manual of the Law and Practice of the Dean of Guild Court (1895)
- Dr Croll’s Life and Work (1896)
- Leith and Its Antiquities
- Treatise on Law and Arbitration in Scotland (1903)
