= Henry Stephens (agriculturalist) =

British writer

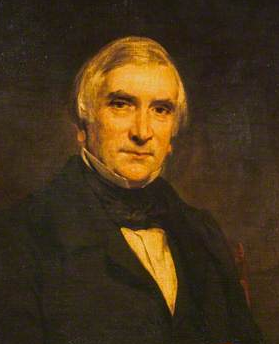
Stephens, by John Watson Gordon, about 1860

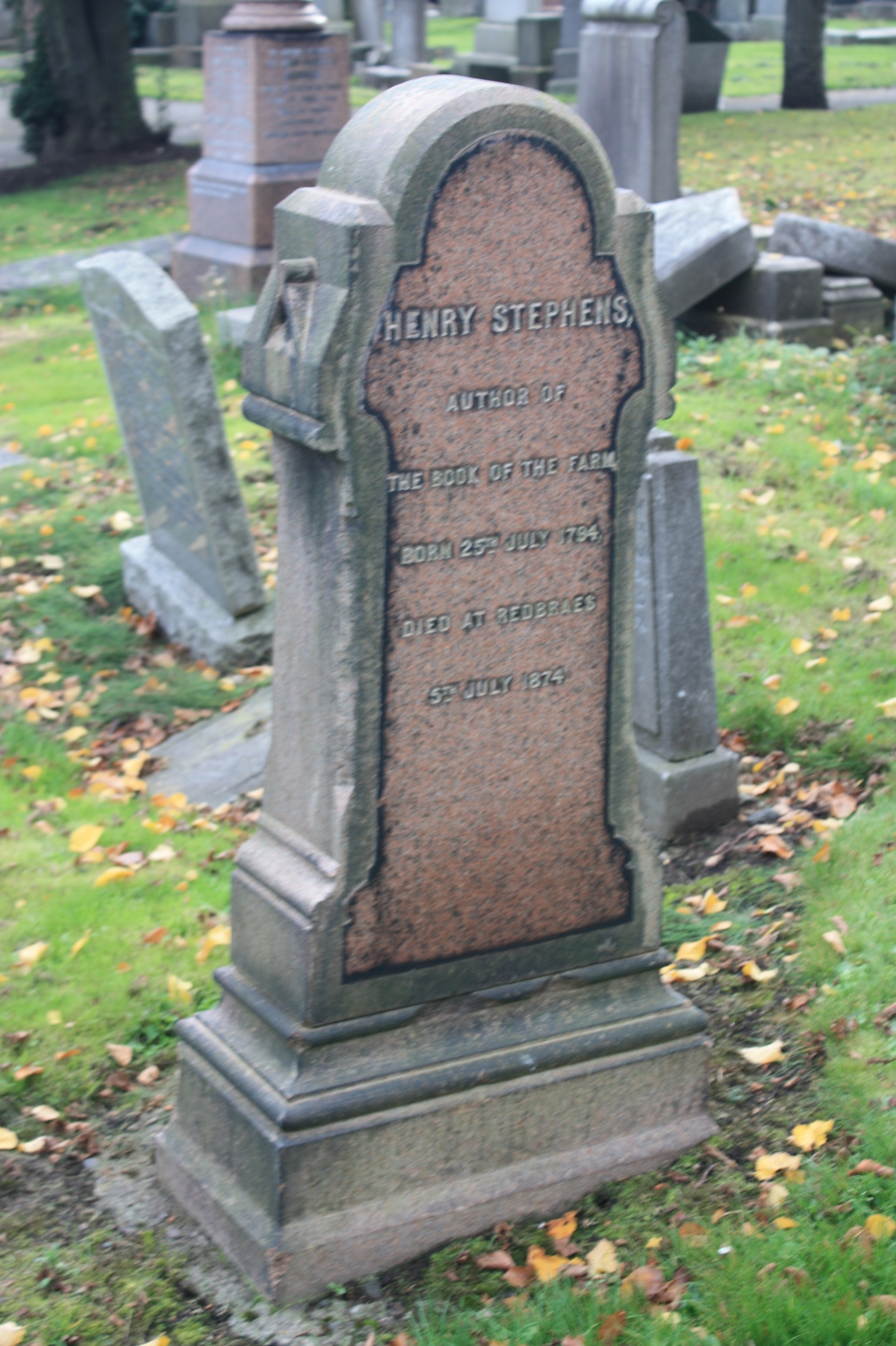
The grave of Henry Stephens, Rosebank Cemetery, Edinburgh

Henry Stephens FRSE (25 July 1795 – 5 July 1874) was a 19th-century Scottish farmer, meteorologist and agricultural author. His multi-volume Book of the Farm was a standard text for some seventy years after its first edition of 1844.

== Life ==
Henry Stephens was born at Keerpoy in Bengal, the son of Dr Andrew Stephens, a surgeon in the East India Company. Upon the death of his father in 1806, his family returned to Dundee in eastern Scotland, and Henry was educated at Dundee Grammar School and the Dundee Academy. Stephens then attended lectures on farming and agricultural chemistry at the University of Edinburgh. He later became a pupil and farmhand of a Berwickshire farmer named George Brown, in order to obtain some practical experience. His mother Sarah Stephens died in 1832 at Keerpoy, aged 66 years, wife of the late Andrew Stephens, esq, of Keerpoy.

He made a tour of continental Europe between 1818 and 1819, focusing on agricultural sites and techniques. Between 1820 and 1830, he farmed his own land at Balmadies in Angus, using progressive and experimental methods. In 1830 he took over Redbraes farm between Edinburgh and Leith. In 1837, he gave up farming, and spent the rest of his life writing works promoting advanced farming practices, documenting traditional methods, and familiarizing the reading public with the basic principles of agricultural science.

Stephens commercially published his first written works in 1841. His The Book of the Farm, which first appeared in 1841 as two volumes, ran into many editions and became the standard reference work for the agriculture of Victorian era Britain, and remained the standard farming manual into the Edwardian era. The work was translated into Japanese between 1875 and 1884, in an edition made up of 64 volumes and prepared by the Bureau for the Promotion of Trade and Industry within the Ministry of the Interior.

In 1843 he was elected a Fellow of the Royal Society of Edinburgh his proposer being Prof Patrick Neill.

Stephens died at home, Redbraes Cottage off Broughton Road in Edinburgh, and was buried nearby at the western (sealed) entrance to Rosebank Cemetery. He was unmarried and had no children.
