= Gilruth =

Gilruth is a Scottish surname. Notable people with the surname include:

- Jenny Gilruth, Scottish politician
- John A. Gilruth (1871–1937), Australian veterinary scientist and former Administrator of the Northern Territory
- May H. Gilruth, (1885–1962), American artist
- Robert R. Gilruth (1913–2000), American aviation and space pioneer
- George Ritchie Gilruth MD FRSE (d.1921), Scottish surgeon

== See also ==
- Mount Gilruth, mountain of Antarctica
