= Hackers Creek =

River in the United States of America

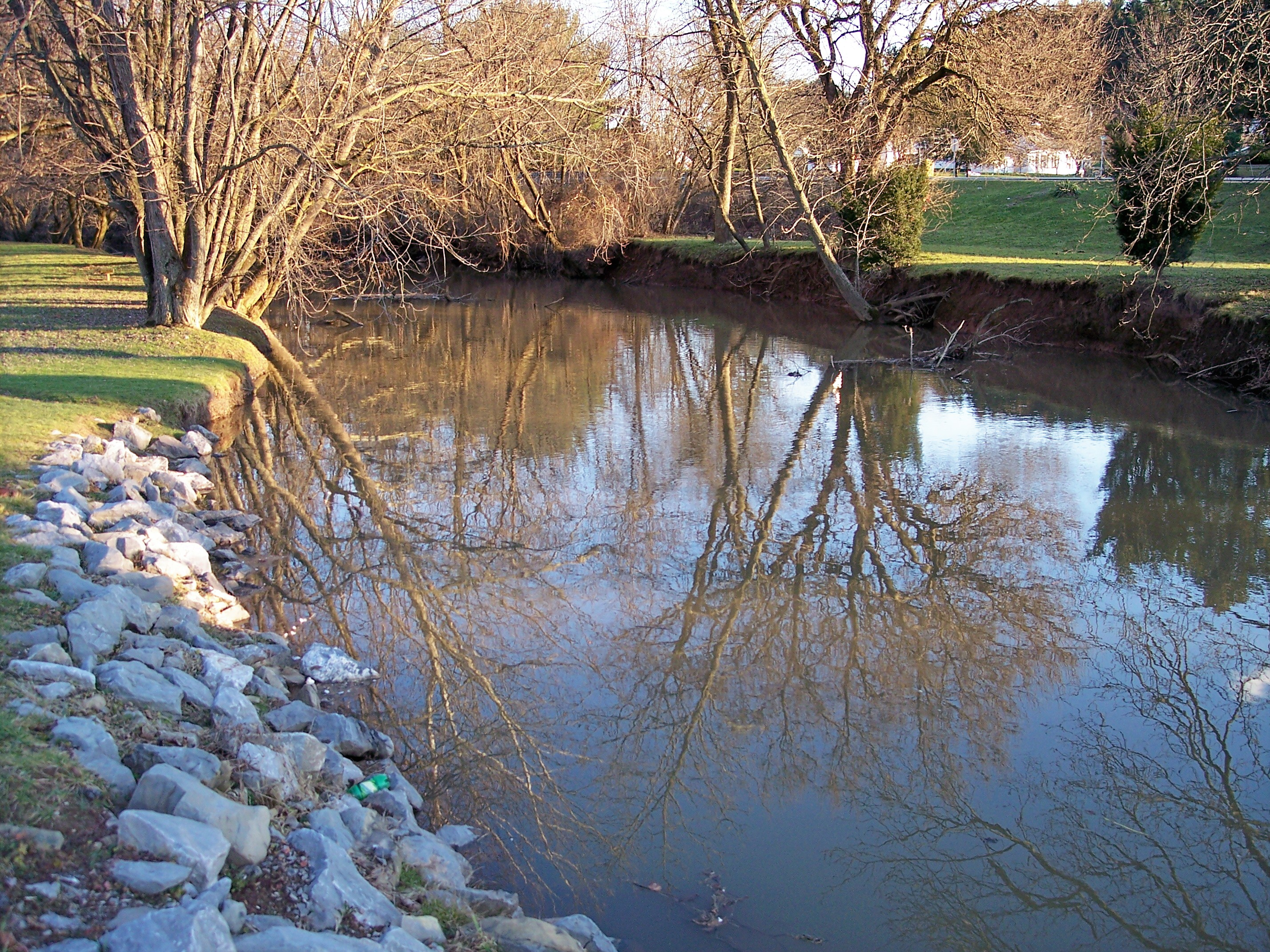
- Hackers Creek in Jane Lew in 2006

- Location of the mouth of Hackers Creek in Harrison County, West Virginia

Location
- Country: United States
- State: West Virginia
- Counties: Upshur, Lewis, Harrison

Physical characteristics
- Source
  - location: Upshur County, West Virginia
  - coordinates: 39°03′29″N 80°12′32″W
  - elevation: 1,367 ft (417 m)
- Mouth: West Fork River
  - location: Harrison County, West Virginia
  - coordinates: 39°08′53″N 80°26′04″W
  - elevation: 984 ft (300 m)
- Length: 25.4 mi (40.9 km)
- Basin size: 58 sq mi (150 km^{2})

Basin features
- Tributaries
  - right: Lifes Run, Jesse Run

Hackers Creek is a tributary of the West Fork River, 25.4 miles (40.9 km) long, in north-central West Virginia in the United States. Via the West Fork, Monongahela and Ohio Rivers, it is part of the watershed of the Mississippi River, draining an area of 58 square miles (150 km^{2}) on the unglaciated portion of the Allegheny Plateau. The stream is believed to have been named for a settler named John Hacker (1743-1824), who lived near the creek for over twenty years from around 1770. He was a magistrate and patriarch in the settlement despite not being able to write.

Hackers Creek rises approximately 5 miles (8.0 km) north of Buckhannon in northern Upshur County and flows westwardly into northeastern Lewis County, where it turns northwestwardly and flows through the town of Jane Lew into southern Harrison County, where it joins the West Fork River from the southeast, approximately three miles (5 km) northwest of Jane Lew.

According to the West Virginia Department of Environmental Protection, approximately 69% of the Hackers Creek watershed is forested, mostly deciduous. Approximately 28% is used for pasture and agriculture, and less than 1% is urban.

== Variant spellings ==
According to the Geographic Names Information System, Hackers Creek has also been known historically as:

- Hacker's Creek
- Hackers Crick
- Heackers Creek
- Heckers Creek

NB: Neighboring Barbour County, West Virginia, also has a (much smaller) Hacker's Creek, a tributary of the Tygart Valley River, about 3 miles downstream from Philippi.

== See also ==
- List of West Virginia rivers
