= Robert Gilchrist =

Robert Gilchrist may refer to:

- Robert Gilchrist (basketball) (born 1990), professional basketball player
- Robert Gilchrist (mayor) (died 1866), mayor of Jersey City, New Jersey
- Robert Gilchrist (cricketer) (1821–1905), Scottish cricketer
- Robert Gilchrist Jr. (1825–1888), Attorney General of New Jersey
- Robert Budd Gilchrist (1796–1856), U.S. federal judge
- Robert Gilchrist (poet) (1797–1844), Tyneside poet
- Robert Murray Gilchrist (1868–1917), English novelist and author
- Robert S. Gilchrist (born 1964), American diplomat
