= Gary Little =

Gary Little may refer to:

- Gary Little (judge) (1939–1988), American judge
- Gary Little (comedian) (1964–2025), Scottish comedian
