= John Sligo =

John Sligo of Carmyle FRSE (1794–1858) was a 19th-century Scottish merchant and amateur geologist.

== Life ==
He was born in 1794 in Leith the son of John Sligo of Carmyle (d.1808) and his wife Christian Knox. His father was a tea and spirit merchant trading on Broad Wynd just off the Shore.

In 1820 his widowed mother was living at 9 Constitution Street in Leith.

John lived at 5 Drummond Place in Edinburgh's Second New Town from the 1820s.

In 1827 he became a member of the Highland Society. In 1832 he was elected a Fellow of the Royal Society of Edinburgh his proposer being Thomas Allan.

In 1857 he is listed as a Director of the Edinburgh to Bathgate Railway (part of the North British Railway).

He died at 5 Drummond Place in 1858 aged 63.
