= Corn Exchange, Leith =

Commercial building in Leith, Scotland

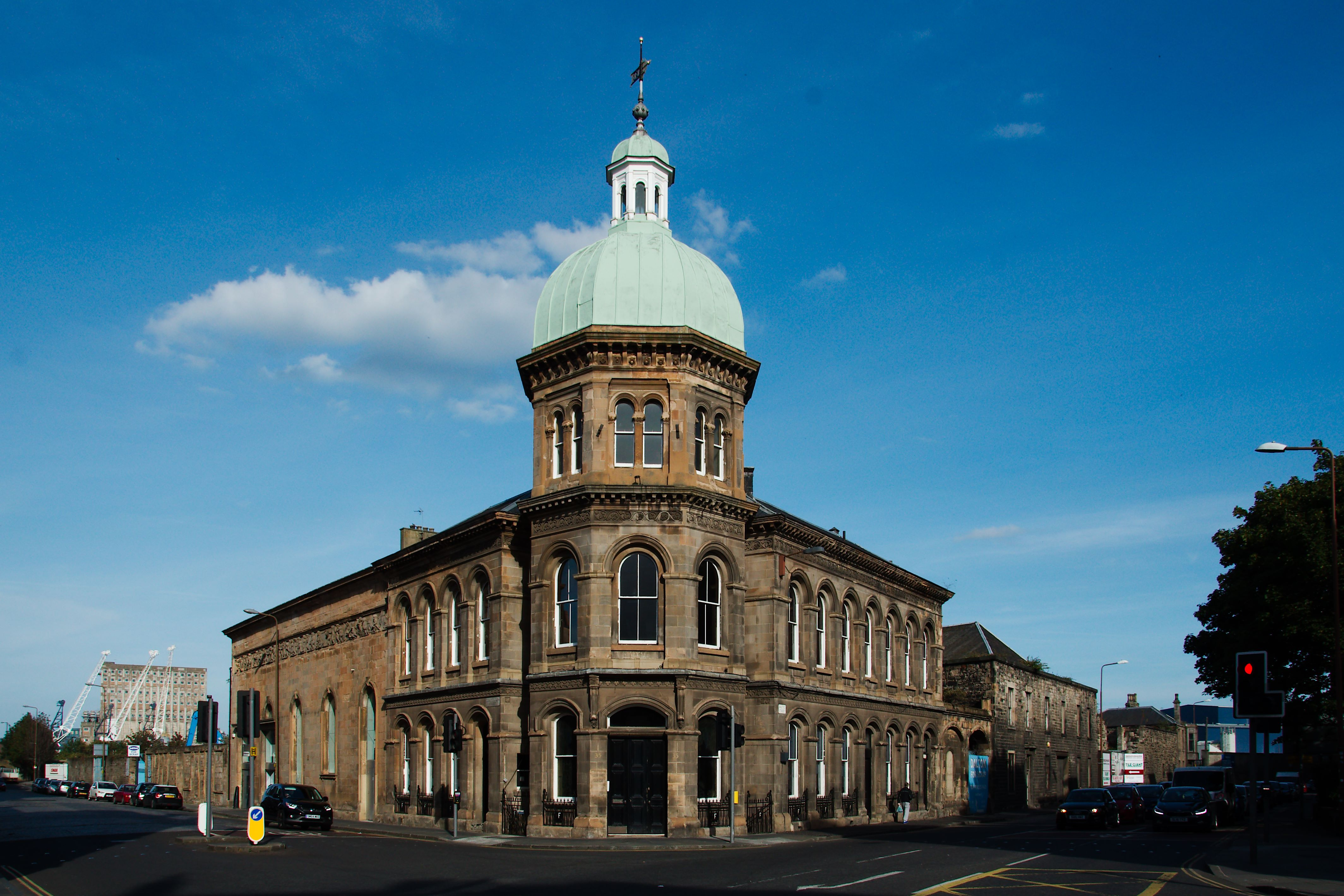
- Corn Exchange, Leith

- Shown in Edinburgh
- 55.9757°N 3.1660°W
- Location: Constitution Street, Leith

History
- Built: 1861

Site notes
- Architect(s): Peddie and Kinnear
- Architectural style: Italianate style

Listed Building – Category A
- Official name: Corn Exchange, 29, 31, 33, 35 Constitution Street, Leith, Edinburgh
- Designated: 14 December 1970
- Reference no.: LB27140

The Corn Exchange is a commercial building in Constitution Street, Leith, Scotland. The structure, which accommodates studio space and an exhibition gallery, is a Category A listed building.

== History ==
In the first half of the 19th century, commercial activity in the Port of Leith was focussed on the Exchange Buildings in Constitution Street. However, in the mid-19th century, a group of local corn merchants decided to form a company to finance and commission a dedicated corn exchange: the site that they selected, on the opposite side of Baltic Street, had been occupied by an old naval yard.

The foundation stone for the new building was laid by the deputy chairman of Leith Chamber of Commerce, W. G. Cochrane, on 16 October 1860. It was designed by Peddie and Kinnear in the Italianate style, built in ashlar stone at a cost of £6,500 and was completed in 1861. The design involved a three-stage octagonal tower on the corner of Constitution Street and Baltic Street with a wing of four bays extending along Constitution Street and a wing of seven bays extending along Baltic Street. The tower featured a segmental-headed doorway with a fanlight flanked by a pair of segmental headed windows on the ground floor, three round headed windows on the first floor, and three bi-partite windows on the second floor. The tower was surmounted by a modillioned cornice, a dome, a cupola and a weather vane. The wings were fenestrated by segmental headed windows on the ground floor and by round headed windows on the first floor. At roof level, there was a frieze decorated by paterae and a modillioned cornice. On the constitution Street frontage, there was an additional section of five bays with a prominent frieze, depicting putti taking part in agricultural activities, which was carved by John Rhind and placed at first floor level. Internally, the principal room was the main hall, which was 110 feet (34 m) long and 70 feet (21 m) wide and featured a roof supported by timber arches.

The use of the building as a corn exchange declined significantly in the wake of the Great Depression of British Agriculture in the late 19th century. Instead, it was re-purposed as a public events venue: early speakers included the Prime Minister, Lord Palmerston, on 2 April 1863. It was also used as a drill hall by the Leith Rifle Volunteers, and, later, as a public house.

A major programme of works to convert the building into studio space was completed in 2005. The conversion, which also included the creation of an exhibition gallery, was carried out to a design by Patience and Highmore and was commended in the "Best Re-Use of a Listed Building" category at the 2006 Scottish Design Awards.

== See also ==
- List of Category A listed buildings in Edinburgh
- List of listed buildings in Edinburgh/23
