= Jane Lew, West Virginia =

- Town
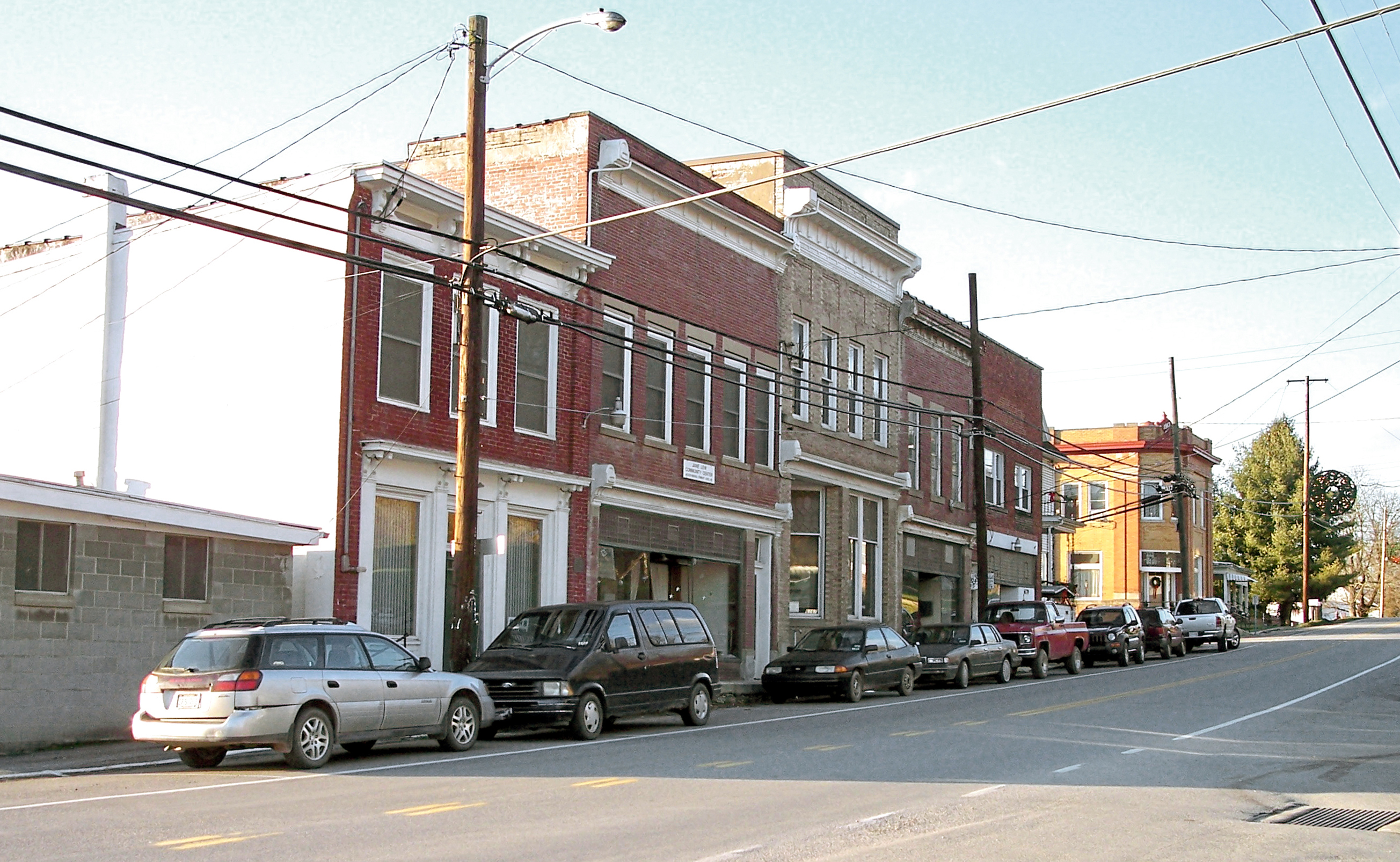
- Main Avenue (U.S. Route 19) in Jane Lew in 2006

- Logo

- Location of Jane Lew in Lewis County, West Virginia.
- Coordinates: 39°6′33″N 80°24′27″W
- Country: United States
- State: West Virginia
- County: Lewis

Government
  - Type: Mayoral
  - Mayor: Ruth Straley

Area
  - Total: 0.25 sq mi (0.64 km^{2})
  - Land: 0.24 sq mi (0.62 km^{2})
  - Water: 0.0077 sq mi (0.02 km^{2})
- Elevation: 1,020 ft (310 m)

Population (2020)
  - Total: 408
  - Estimate (2021): 406
  - Density: 1,617.5/sq mi (624.51/km^{2})
- Time zone: UTC-5 (Eastern (EST))
  - Summer (DST): UTC-4 (EDT)
- ZIP code: 26378
- Area code: 304
- FIPS code: 54-40828
- GNIS feature ID: 1540818
- Website: townofjanelew.com

Jane Lew is a town in Lewis County, West Virginia, United States. The population was 409 at the time of the 2020 census.

== History ==
The community was named after Jane Lew, the mother of the original owner of the town site.

== Geography ==
Jane Lew is located at 39°6′33″N 80°24′27″W (39.109203, -80.407624), along Hackers Creek in northern Lewis County.

According to the United States Census Bureau, the town has a total area of 0.25 square miles (0.65 km^{2}), of which 0.24 square miles (0.62 km^{2}) is land and 0.01 square miles (0.03 km^{2}) is water.

== Demographics ==
Historical population
Census	Pop.	Note	%±
1880	142		—
1890	228		60.6%
1910	327		—
1920	560		71.3%
1930	445		−20.5%
1940	505		13.5%
1950	491		−2.8%
1960	426		−13.2%
1970	397		−6.8%
1980	406		2.3%
1990	439		8.1%
2000	406		−7.5%
2010	409		0.7%
2020	408		−0.2%
2021 (est.)	406	▼	−0.5%
U.S. Decennial Census

=== 2010 census ===
As of the census of 2010, there were 409 people, 195 households, and 111 families living in the town. The population density was 1,704.2 inhabitants per square mile (658.0/km^{2}). There were 213 housing units at an average density of 887.5 per square mile (342.7/km^{2}). The racial makeup of the town was 98.8% White, 0.2% Native American, 0.2% Asian, and 0.7% from two or more races. Hispanic or Latino of any race were 0.2% of the population.

There were 195 households, of which 24.1% had children under the age of 18 living with them, 42.6% were married couples living together, 10.8% had a female householder with no husband present, 3.6% had a male householder with no wife present, and 43.1% were non-families. 38.5% of all households were made up of individuals, and 19% had someone living alone who was 65 years of age or older. The average household size was 2.10 and the average family size was 2.72.

The median age in the town was 41.8 years. 19.3% of residents were under the age of 18; 8.2% were between the ages of 18 and 24; 24.5% were from 25 to 44; 30.5% were from 45 to 64; and 17.6% were 65 years of age or older. The gender makeup of the town was 47.4% male and 52.6% female.

=== 2000 census ===
As of the census of 2000, there were 406 people, 209 households, and 117 families living in the town. The population density was 1,635.2 inhabitants per square mile (627.0/km^{2}). There were 220 housing units at an average density of 886.1 per square mile (339.8/km^{2}). The racial makeup of the town was 98.03% White, 0.25% Native American, and 1.72% from two or more races. Hispanic or Latino of any race were 1.23% of the population.

There were 209 households, out of which 17.7% had children under the age of 18 living with them, 40.7% were married couples living together, 11.0% had a female householder with no husband present, and 44.0% were non-families. 40.7% of all households were made up of individuals, and 18.7% had someone living alone who was 65 years of age or older. The average household size was 1.94 and the average family size was 2.58.

In the town, the population was spread out, with 15.0% under the age of 18, 7.9% from 18 to 24, 28.8% from 25 to 44, 24.6% from 45 to 64, and 23.6% who were 65 years of age or older. The median age was 44 years. For every 100 females, there were 84.5 males. For every 100 females age 18 and over, there were 79.7 males.

The median income for a household in the town was $23,571, and the median income for a family was $30,000. Males had a median income of $29,464 versus $16,667 for females. The per capita income for the town was $16,540. About 5.3% of families and 7.9% of the population were below the poverty line, including 2.9% of those under age 18 and 11.5% of those age 65 or over.

== Notable people ==
- May H. Gilruth, artist and painter
- Patrick S. Martin, member of the West Virginia Senate
- Joseph Marcellus McWhorter, lawyer, jurist, and politician
- William Neely, actor and writer
- Chub Watson, basketball player for Davis & Elkins College and Marshall University

== Climate ==
The climate in this area is characterized by relatively high temperatures and evenly distributed precipitation throughout the year. According to the Köppen Climate Classification system, Jane Lew has a Humid subtropical climate, abbreviated "Cfa" on climate maps.

Climate data for Jane Lew, West Virginia
Month	Jan	Feb	Mar	Apr	May	Jun	Jul	Aug	Sep	Oct	Nov	Dec	Year
Mean daily maximum °C (°F)	48 (9)	48 (9)	55 (13)	67 (19)	77 (25)	84 (29)	89 (32)	86 (30)	82 (28)	70 (21)	57 (14)	48 (9)	68 (20)
Mean daily minimum °C (°F)	24 (−4)	24 (−4)	29 (−2)	38 (3)	47 (8)	56 (13)	60 (16)	59 (15)	54 (12)	40 (4)	32 (0)	26 (−3)	41 (5)
Average precipitation mm (inches)	3.6 (91)	3 (76)	3.8 (97)	3.7 (94)	4.2 (110)	4.6 (120)	4.5 (110)	4.5 (110)	3.5 (89)	2.8 (71)	3 (76)	3.2 (81)	44.5 (1,130)
Source: Weatherbase

== Education ==
Jane Lew Elementary School. Jane Lew used to have a high school in operation (Jane Lew High School) from 1912 until 1966, when it consolidated with two another local schools to make Lewis County High School. Jane Lew High also won a West Virginia state boys basketball championship in 1922.
