= Gary Little (comedian) =

Scottish comedian (1964–2025)

- Born: 1964; Glasgow, Scotland
- Died: 15 August 2025 (aged 61) near Morvich, Scotland

Comedy career
- Years active: 2003–2025
- Medium: Stand-up
- Subjects: Mental health; addiction

Gary Little (1964 – 15 August 2025) was a Scottish comedian. Described as one of Scotland's finest comedians and as a "leading light" and "literal giant" of the Scottish comedy scene, Little was a regular headliner at many of the top comedy clubs in the UK. He was a fixture at the Edinburgh Festival Fringe, where he performed regularly.

== Career ==
Little began performing comedy in 2003, when he became a finalist in a competition by The Stand Comedy Club and The Daily Record. He performed regularly at the Glasgow International Comedy Festival and the Edinburgh Fringe, where in 2005 he performed his first one man show.

In 2010, he performed at the Breakneck Comedy Club, on King Street, Aberdeen. In 2016, together with the radio presenter Julia Sutherland, Little co-wrote and presented the show "Jail Mates" on BBC. Inspired by real life events, the fictional comedy show was about a convict and the woman who writes to him in prison. In 2017, he took his show to Australia and performed at the Perth Fringe. In 2018, he performed at the Adelaide Fringe. Also in 2018, he performed at the Scottish Comedy Festival with the show "Big Mouth". In 2022, he performed at The Beehive Inn at the Grassmarket. In 2024, Little created a four part stand-up series for BBC Radio 4, titled "Gary Little: At Large", the series offered a "hilarious perspective of life before, behind, and beyond bars". A performance in late July 2025 at the Number 57 Pub Company in Dundee was one of his final gigs.

Little also performed internationally, at venues in the UAE, Canada, Thailand and the US (especially at the New York Comedy Festival).

== Style ==
Little's stand-up shows tackled themes of mental health and addiction and in his material, he often drew from his controversial personal experiences, including his time in prison.

== Personal life and death ==
Little was born in 1964. He was from Springburn, and grew up in Maryhill. In 1994, he was imprisoned at Barlinnie for an ecstasy dealing charge, being released after serving four years out of an eight year sentence. After his release in 1999, Little started working as a forklift truck driver at the HarperCollins warehouse in Bishopbriggs. In 2007, he was jailed for 27 months for stealing books from the warehouse.

Little died on 15 August 2025, at the age of 61. He had been hillwalking on the Five Sisters of Kintail trail, when he was killed as the result of a fall.

== Philanthropy ==
Little was a volunteer for the Scottish charity MCR Pathways, where he mentored three people from Whitehill Secondary School and All Saints Secondary School.

In September 2023, Little performed at the Cruden Hall in Greenock as part of a fundraiser for the Inverclyde charity Inverclyde Faith in Throughcare.

== Awards ==
In 2014, Little became the inaugural winner of the Best Headline and Show Award of the Scottish Comedy Awards.
