= Derek Trail =

Scottish footballer

Personal information
- Full name: Derek John Falconer Trail
- Date of birth: 2 January 1946
- Place of birth: Leith, Scotland
- Position: Forward

Youth career
- Tynecastle Athletic

Senior career*
Years	Team	Apps	(Gls)
1963–1966	Rangers	4	(0)
1966–1967	Falkirk	2	(0)
1967–1969	Workington	44	(5)
1969–1970	Hartlepool United	39	(2)
	Sutherland	?	(?)
1974–1975	Meadowbank Thistle	4	(0)
1975–1976	Alloa Athletic	1	(0)
- * Club domestic league appearances and goals

Derek Trail (born 2 January 1946 in Leith) is a Scottish former professional footballer. He started his career at Tynecastle Athletic before signing for Rangers for whom he made 4 first-team appearances between 1963 and 1966. Later clubs included Falkirk, Workington and Hartlepool United. After a spell in Australia with Sutherland he returned to Scotland where he ended his career with first Meadowbank Thistle and then Alloa Athletic.
