= Leith =

Port district of Edinburgh, Scotland

Coordinates: 55.98°N 3.17°W

Leith: Scottish Gaelic: Lìte
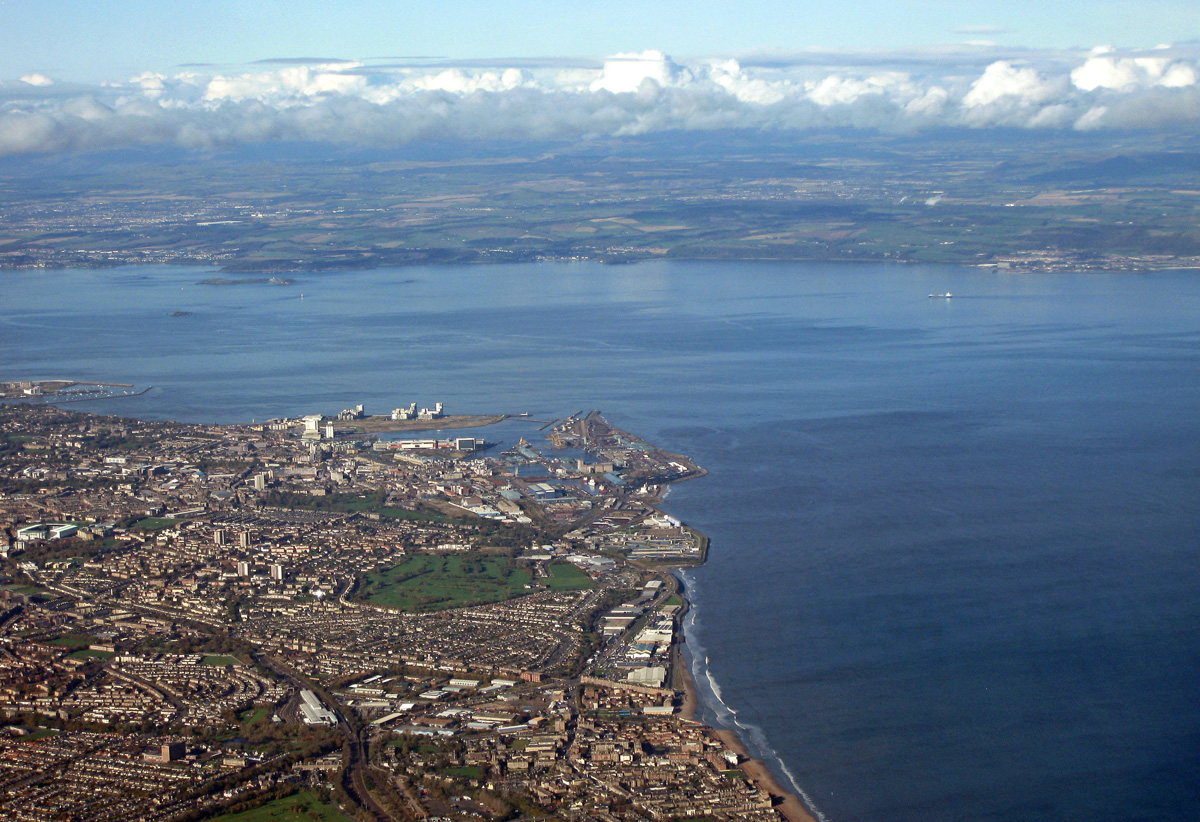
- Aerial view of Leith and the Firth of Forth

- Location within the City of Edinburgh council area Location within Scotland
- Population: 50,030 (2011)
- Council area: City of Edinburgh
- Lieutenancy area: Edinburgh
- Country: Scotland
- Sovereign state: United Kingdom
- Post town: EDINBURGH
- Postcode district: EH6
- Dialling code: 0131
- Police: Scotland
- Fire: Scottish
- Ambulance: Scottish
- UK Parliament: Edinburgh North and Leith
- Scottish Parliament: Edinburgh Northern and Leith

Leith (/liːθ/; Scottish Gaelic: Lìte) is a former burgh and port town in Scotland, incorporated with Edinburgh in 1920, founded at the mouth of the Water of Leith. It is home to the Port of Leith.

The earliest surviving historical references are in the royal charter authorising the construction of Holyrood Abbey in 1128 in which it is termed Inverlet (Inverleith). After centuries of control by Edinburgh, Leith was made a separate burgh in 1833 only to be merged into Edinburgh in 1920.

Leith is located on the southern shore of the Firth of Forth and lies within the City of Edinburgh council area; since 2007 it has formed one of 17 multi-member wards of the city.

== History ==
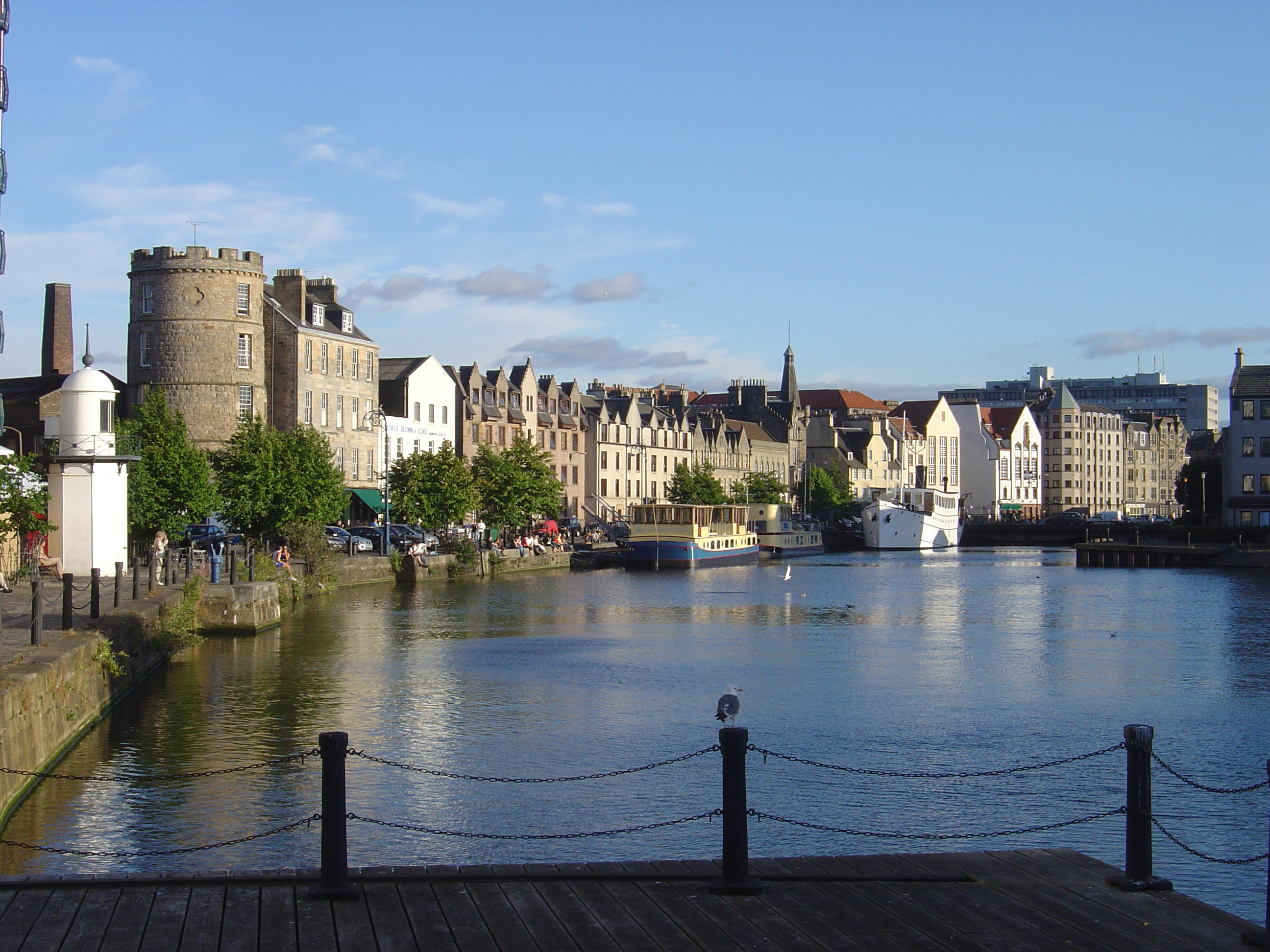
The Shore, Leith

As the major port serving Edinburgh, Leith has seen many significant events in Scottish history.

=== Etymology ===
The name Leith may be of Brittonic origin and derived from *lejth meaning "damp, moist" (Welsh llaith). Another suggestion is that it comes from various Celtic words meaning "grey".

The Gaelic form of the name is Lìte, with a grave accent.

=== First settlement ===
Evidence of the earliest settlement in Leith comes from several archaeological digs undertaken in the Shore area in the late 20th century. Amongst the finds were medieval wharf edges from the 12th century. This date fits with the earliest documentary evidence of settlement in Leith, the foundation charter of Holyrood Abbey.

Mary of Guelders, the bride of James II, arrived on 18 May 1449 and rested in the Convent of St Anthony. Prominent Leith merchants and shipowners included James Makysone, who supplied tapestry to James IV in 1498 for his new lodging at Stirling Castle and in 1503 imported a timber keel from France for building one of the king's ships.

=== 16th century ===
The town was burnt by the Earl of Hertford (on the orders of Henry VIII of England) in retaliation for the rejection of the Treaty of Greenwich by the Parliament of Scotland in 1543. Mary of Guise ruled Scotland from Leith in 1560 as regent while her daughter Mary, Queen of Scots remained in France. Mary of Guise moved the Scottish court to Leith, to a site that is now Parliament Street, off Coalhill. According to the 18th-century historian William Maitland, her palace was situated on Rotten Row, now Water Street. Artifacts from the demolished residence are held by the National Museum of Scotland, and her sculptured coat of arms, dated 1560, can be seen in South Leith Parish Church. When the large French garrison stationed in Leith was attacked by Scottish Protestant lords, reinforced by troops and artillery sent from England, Mary of Guise was forced to shut herself in Edinburgh Castle. In June 1560, Mary of Guise died, and the Siege of Leith ended with the departure of the French troops in accordance with the Treaty of Leith, also known as the Treaty of Edinburgh.

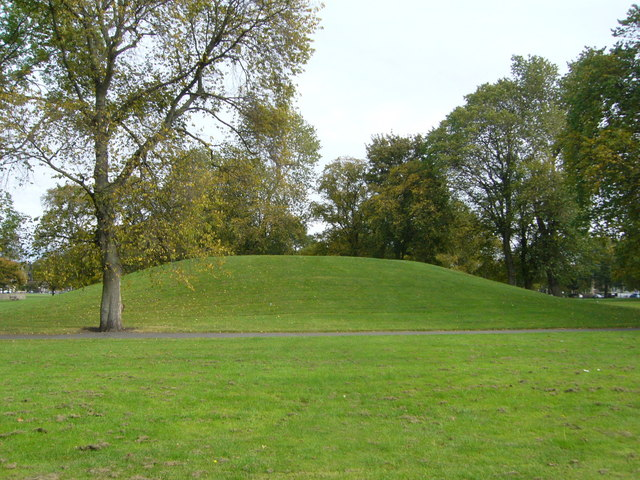
'Giant's Brae' on Leith Links

Two mounds on Leith Links, known as "Giant's Brae" and "Lady Fyfe's Brae", identified as Somerset's Battery and Pelham's Battery respectively, are believed to be artillery mounds created for the siege in April 1560 and are listed as scheduled monuments, but may be natural hillocks. The best documented day of the siege was 7 May 1560, when the English and Scots charged the walls of Leith with ladders that turned out to be too short. John Knox records the delight of Mary of Guise at the failure of the attack, and English sources report 1000 casualties.

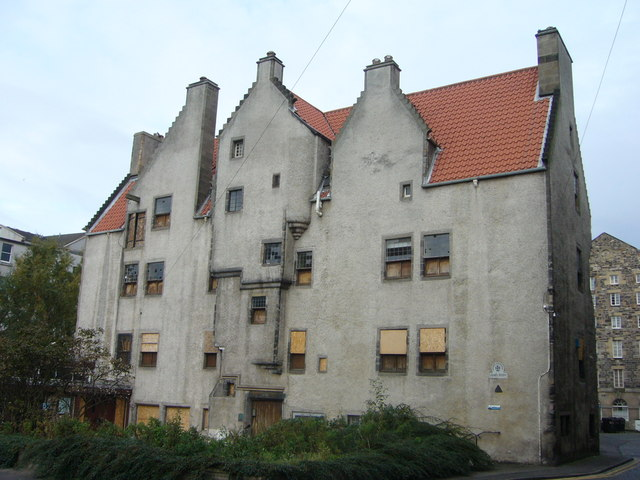
Lamb's House in 2009

On 19 August 1561, Mary, Queen of Scots arrived in Leith and, finding no welcoming party to receive her, made a brief stop at the house of Andrew Lamb before being collected and escorted by coach to Holyrood Palace to begin her ill-fated six-year reign. Mary's court came to the sands of Leith to enjoy equestrian tournaments of "running at the ring" performed by courtiers and diplomats in exotic costumes.

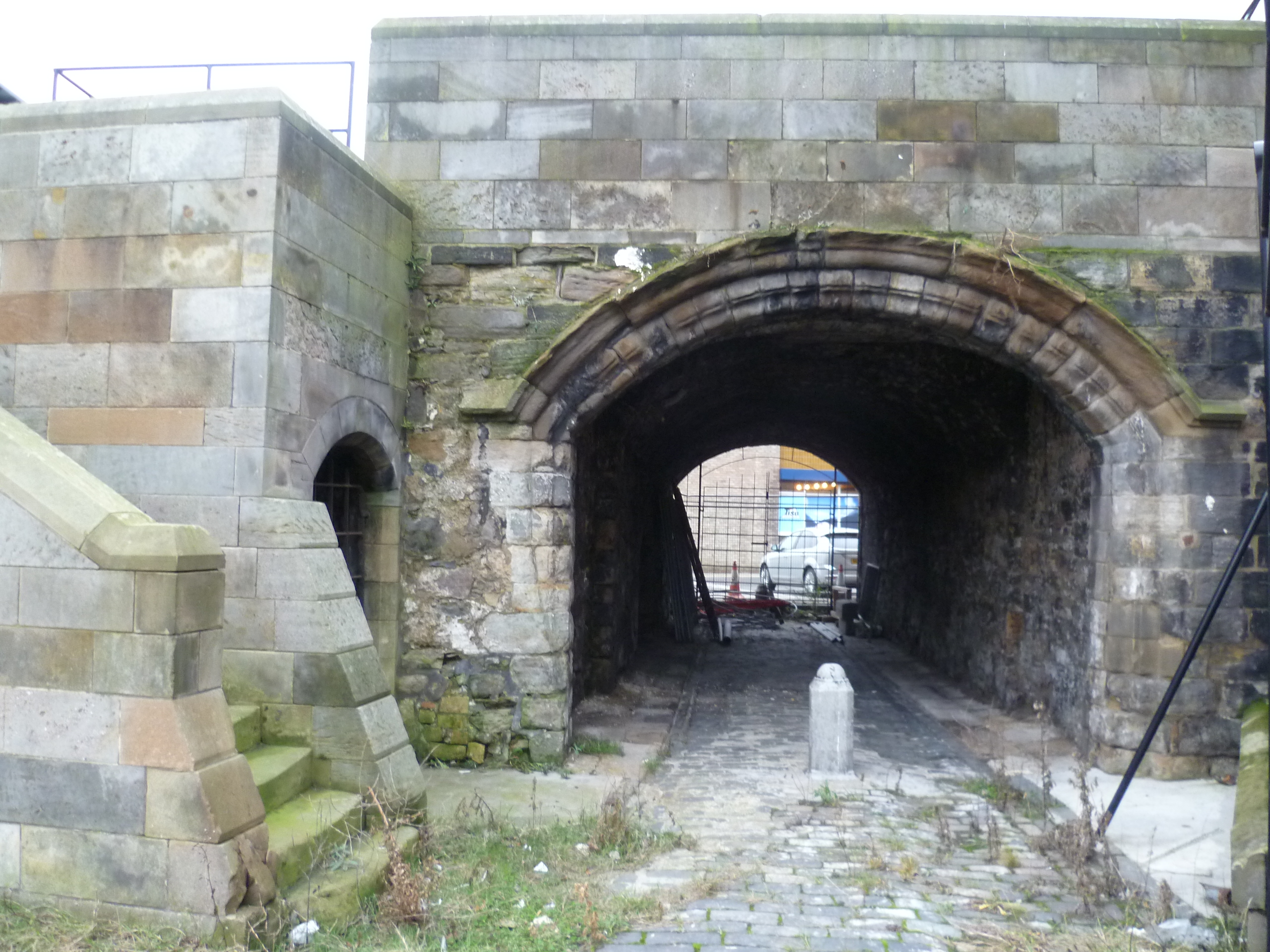
Remains of the Citadel

During the civil war which followed Mary's abdication in 1567, troops fighting for James VI of Scotland against his mother's supporters in Edinburgh Castle based themselves in Leith from 1571 to 1573, a period called the "Wars between Leith and Edinburgh". In January 1581 The Shore was the scene of a mock combat, involving an assault on the Pope's Castel Sant'Angelo built on boats, for the marriage of Elizabeth Stuart, 2nd Countess of Moray and James Stewart for the entertainment of guests including James VI. In 1590, James's consort, Anne of Denmark, was lodged in the King's Wark on her arrival.

=== 17th century ===
In 1622 there was conflict between privateer "Dunkirker ships" flying the Spanish flag and ships from the Dutch Republic. King James allowed a Dunkirker to lie at Leith Roads in June 1622, and soldiers from the ship were able to come ashore at Leith. Three Dutch ships, commanded by Willem de Zoete, Lord of Hautain, Admiral of Zeeland, arrived and attacked the Dunkirker through the night. The fighting stopped in the morning when the tide beached the ships. The Scottish authorities requested the fighting stop. The ships were allowed into Leith harbour where artillery from Edinburgh Castle was placed to ensure order.

Leith suffered during the 1645 plague outbreak, with over 50% of the population in the southern district dying. Archaeological excavations in 2016 at St Mary's RC Primary School, by Wardell Armstrong, as part of a planning condition, found a mass grave of 81 bodies from the 1645 plague. The archaeologists surmised that there was extreme fear of dying from this plague, likely Pneumonic, as many of the bodies were hastily buried in their clothes and still had money and other personal items on them, indicating that people did not want to touch the bodies, even to remove money.

In 1650, Leith was a prospective battleground when the Army of the Covenant, led by General David Leslie, threw up an earthen rampart between Calton Hill and Leith to defend the northern approach to Edinburgh against Oliver Cromwell's forces. This rampart became the line of one of Edinburgh's longest streets, Leith Walk. After Cromwell's victory at the Battle of Dunbar in 1650 and subsequent occupation of Scotland, a fort known as Leith Citadel was erected in 1656 to regulate the port traffic. All that remains of the fort today is a vaulted trance in Dock Street which was its main entrance. New industry in Leith included the Leith Sugar House, founded in 1677.

=== 18th century ===
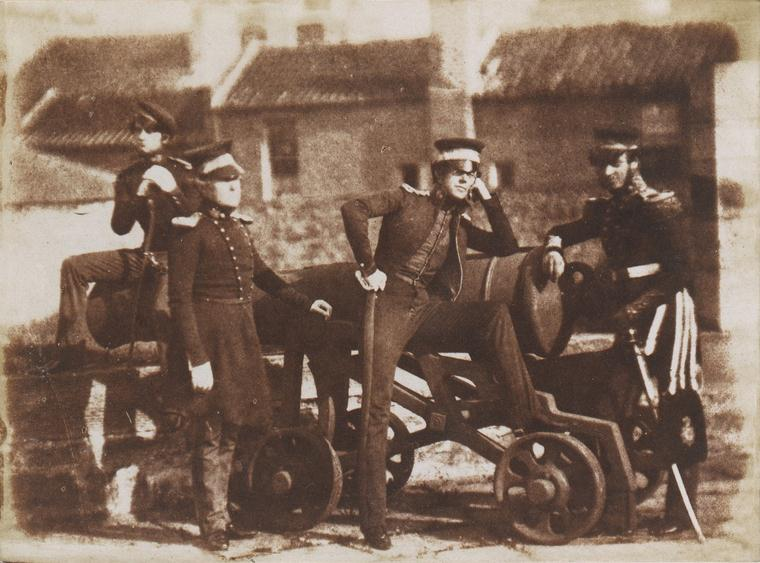
Royal Artillery at Leith Fort, 1846

During the American War of Independence the Scot, John Paul Jones, who, with John Barry, is credited as founder of the US Navy, set sail on 14 August 1779 as commodore of a squadron of seven ships with the intention of destroying British commerce in the North Sea. He intended to capture the port of Leith and hold it for ransom, but his plan was thwarted when a gale on 16 September kept him at the mouth of the Firth of Forth. The scare he caused led to the hasty erection of Leith Fort, with a battery of nine guns, designed by James Craig, the architect of Edinburgh's New Town, and built in 1780. A Georgian terrace to the north-east served as officers' quarters, and was known as "London Row" because, being brick-built, it looked more like a London terrace than any in Edinburgh. The fort was in active use until 1955, latterly serving for National Service training. Most of the barracks were demolished to build a Council housing scheme centred on Fort House and enclosed by the old fort walls. The council development was an award-winning scheme in its day (1955), but the building was demolished in January 2013 and the site has been redeveloped with new low-density housing, again award-winning. A pair of the old fort's gatehouses survive at the southern entrance to the scheme.

From the twelfth century South Leith was part of the parish of Restalrig and had no church of its own. After the Scottish Reformation the principal parish kirk for Leith was South Leith Parish Church, originally constructed in 1483. In June 1811 a census gave the population of South Leith as 15,938; North Leith 4,875. With a procession and ceremony, the foundation stone of the new church for the parish of North Leith was laid on 11 April 1814.

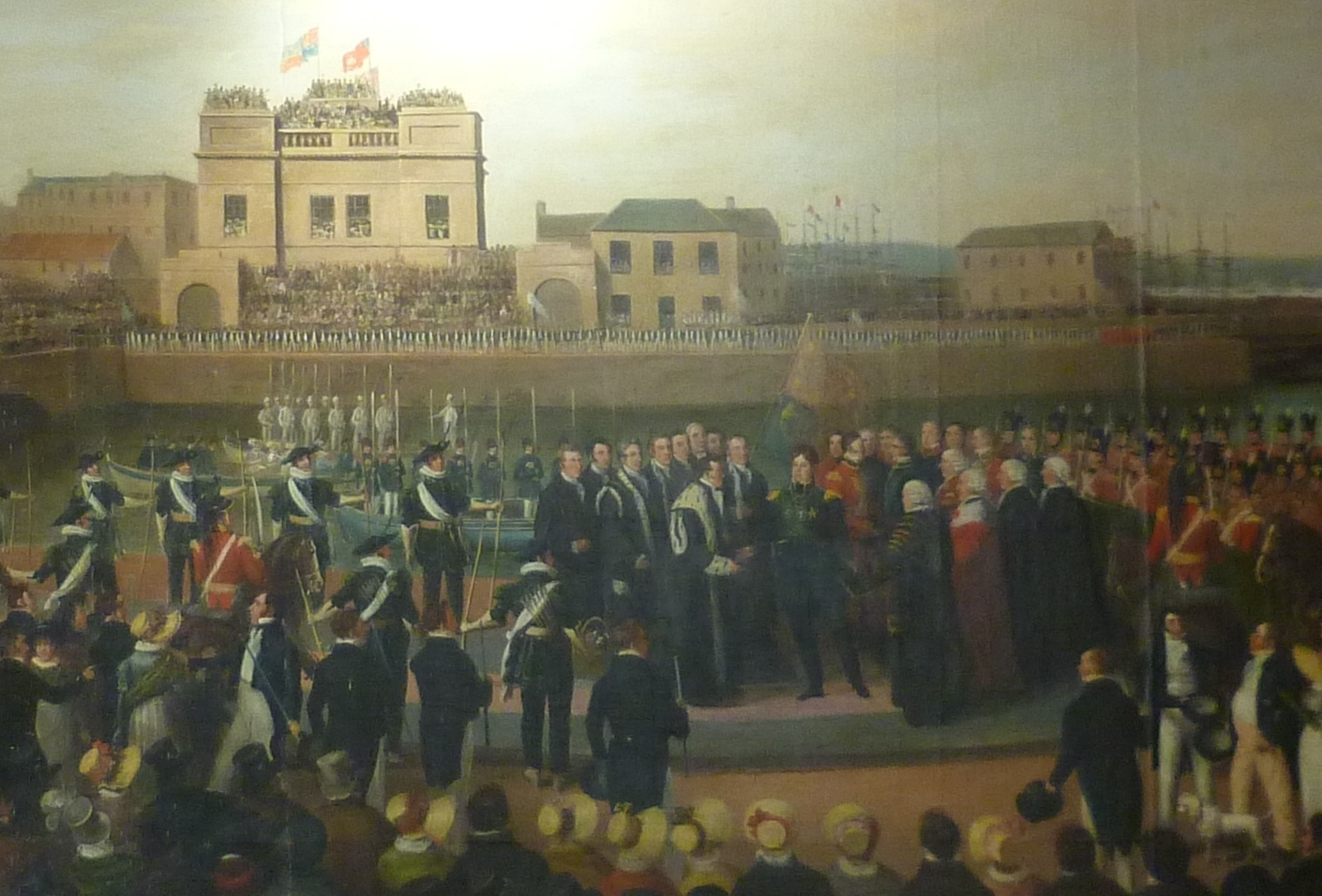
King George IV landing at Leith

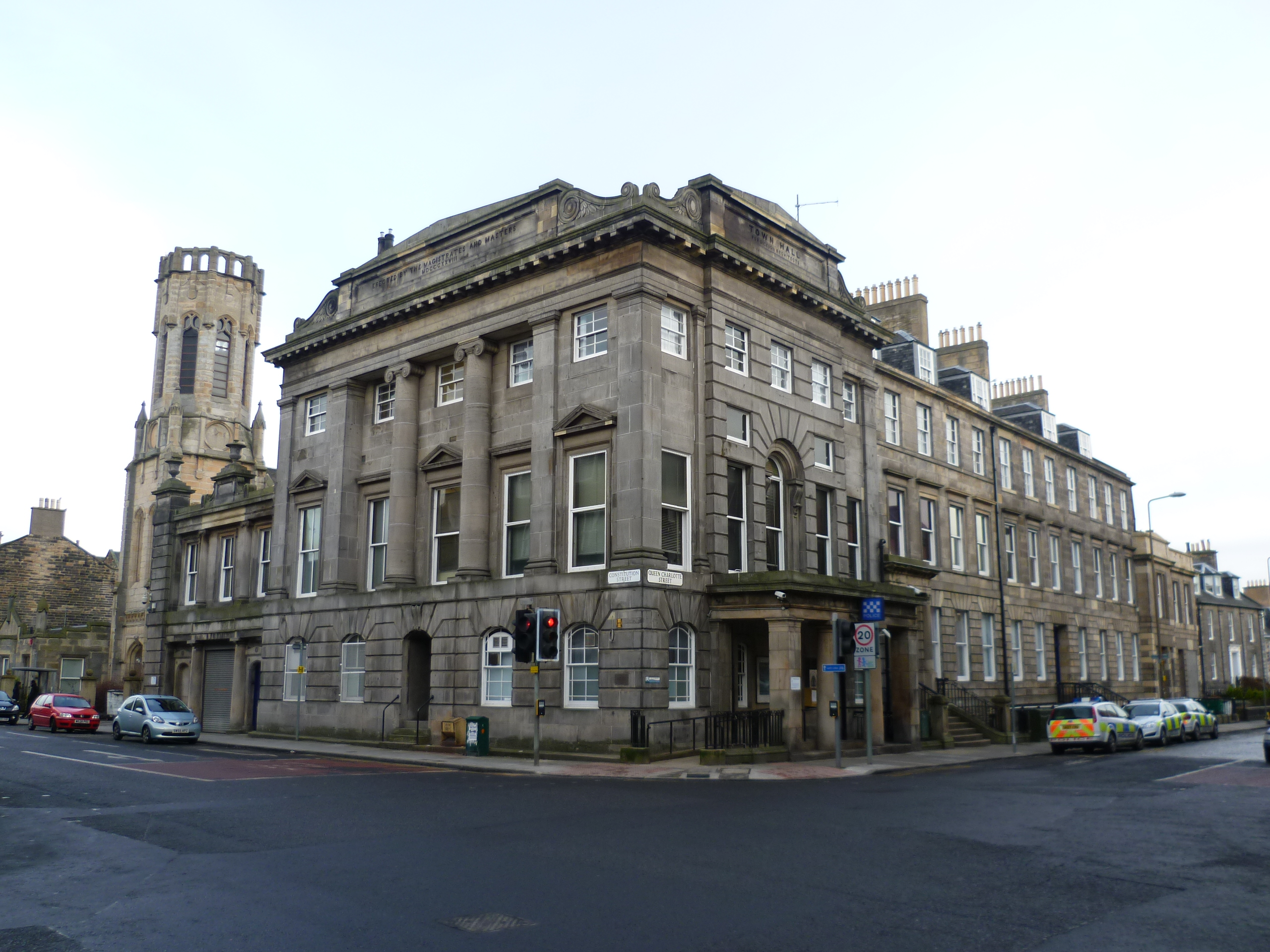
Old Town Hall, Leith, now a police station

Leith was the port of entry for the visit of King George IV to Scotland, and The Old Ship Hotel and King's Landing was then given its new name, to mark the king's arrival by ship's boat at Leith Shore for this event, and this monarch was welcomed by the High Constabulary of the Port of Leith. A painting of the occasion hung in Leith Town Hall, now Leith Police station.

=== 19th century ===
On 20 May 1806, there was a procession of the Lord Provost of Edinburgh, Baillies, and Council, along with a numerous company of ladies and gentleman, for the opening of the first new wet dock, the first of its kind in Scotland. The Fife packet called The Buccleuch was the first to enter the dock, with the civic dignitaries on board, amid discharges of artillery from the fort and His Majesty's warships in Leith Roads. The foundation stone for the second (middle) wet dock was laid on 14 March 1811, which was completed and opened with due ceremony in 1817 by Lord Provost Arbuthnot. The same year the Trinity House in Kirkgate was erected in Grecian architectural style at an expense of £2500.

In 1809, the Tally Toor, a martello tower was constructed to defend the entrance of the harbour during the Napoleonic Wars. It is now a scheduled monument within the port.

Leith Municipal Government Act 1827
- Act of Parliament
- Parliament of the United Kingdom
- Long title: An Act to provide for the Municipal Government of the Town and Suburbs of Leith; for the further Administration of Justice; and for the Regulation of the Police therein.
- Citation: 7 & 8 Geo. 4. c. cxii

Dates
- Royal assent: 2 July 1827
Other legislation
| Repealed by | Leith Municipal and Police Act 1848 |

Text of statute as originally enacted

Historically Leith was governed by the Town Council of Edinburgh, with separately organised baillies appointed by various bodies without contact with each other. The result became very unsatisfactory, and half of Leith was provided with no municipal government whatever or any local magistrates. An act of Parliament, the Leith Municipal Government Act 1827 (7 & 8 Geo. 4. c. cxii) arranged for municipal government and administration of justice in the town, providing watching, paving, cleansing, and lighting, with Edinburgh Council responding to the views of Leith townspeople. The Burgh Reform Act 1833 (3 & 4 Will. 4. c. 46) made Leith a parliamentary burgh, which jointly with Portobello and Musselburgh was represented by one Member of Parliament (MP). On 1 November 1833, Leith became a separate municipal burgh, with its own provost, magistrates, and council, and was no longer run by bailies. Historically the Lord Provost of Edinburgh was virtute officii (by virtue of office) Admiral of the Firth of Forth, the Provost of Leith was Admiral of the port, and his four bailies were admirals-depute.

Emperor Nicholas II of Russia arrived by sea at Leith with his family and suite on Tuesday 22 September 1896. Scottish anarchist Thomas Hastie Bell managed to get in his face to criticise him.

=== 20th and 21st centuries ===
Leith was the scene of the dockers strike in 1913 recounted in the book Red Scotland.

Continued growth meant that Leith and Edinburgh formed a contiguous urban area. Leith was merged with Edinburgh on 1 November 1920 despite a plebiscite in which the people of Leith voted 26,810 to 4,340 against the merger. The population of Leith at the time of the merger was 80,000, representing 20% of the entire population of Edinburgh in around 5% of the city area, reflecting the town's high density. It was Scotland's sixth largest town at the time of the merger.

Leith suffered from considerable demolition through Improvement or slum clearance schemes, with many historic buildings lost rather than upgraded. This included the Leith Citadel and Central Comprehensive Development Area agreed in the 1950s that saw the loss of the Kirkgate, Leith's historic centre.

Until 1923 there was no through tram service between Leith and Edinburgh; at the boundary in Leith Walk it was necessary to change from a Leith tram (electrically powered) to an Edinburgh tram (cable hauled) until the electrification of the Edinburgh Corporation Tramways in the early 1920s.

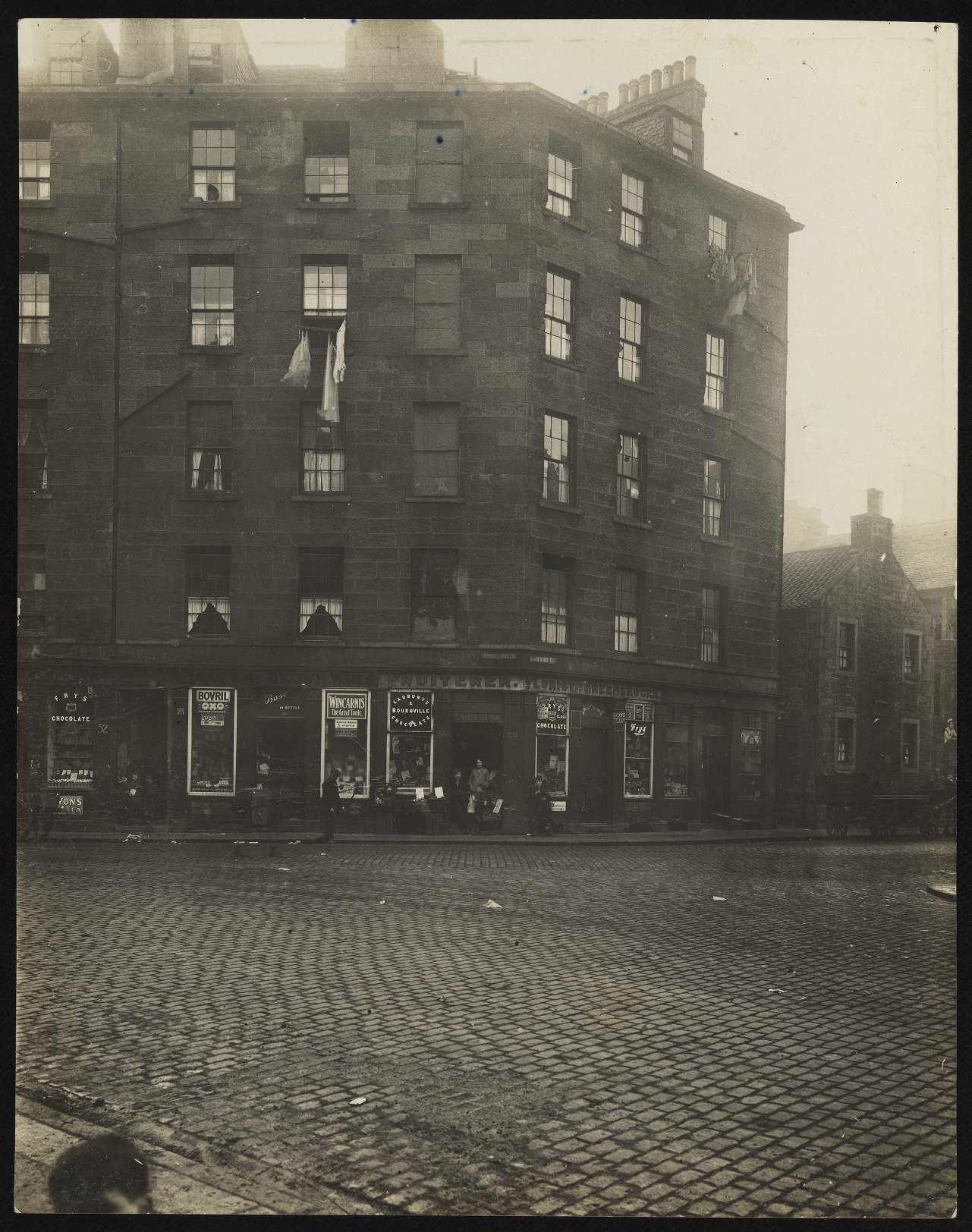
Leith in the 1920s, from the Leith Improvement Scheme Photographs

Leith has undergone significant regeneration and is now a busy port with visits from cruise liners and the home of the Royal Yacht Britannia, the Ocean Terminal shopping centre, and administrative offices for several departments of the Scottish Government. The council and government's 'Leith Project' provided a further economic boost. The shore area of Leith, once unattractive, is now a centre for a range of new pubs and restaurants in charming surroundings. On 6 November 2003, Leith was the location for the MTV Europe Music Awards, with a temporary venue being built next to Ocean Terminal.

== Traditional industries ==
Leith was Scotland's leader in several industries for many centuries. Of these the most notable are:

- Glass – the Leith Glassworks stood on Baltic Street and dated from 1746. There is also some reference to earlier glass production from 1682 at Leith Citadel. Leith specialised in wine bottles, largely for export to France and Spain. At its peak (c. 1770) production was one million bottles per week. The Leith pattern bottle is the parallel-sided, round shouldered, narrow neck bottle now dominant within the wine industry. Around 1770 the company branched into lead crystal glass, mainly for chandeliers. This was under a new company name of the Edinburgh Crystal Company but stood on the same site in Leith (ironically this company has never truly been in "Edinburgh").
- Soap – the Anchor Soapworks was established on Water Street around 1680. This largely used whale oil in its production. This survived until around 1930.

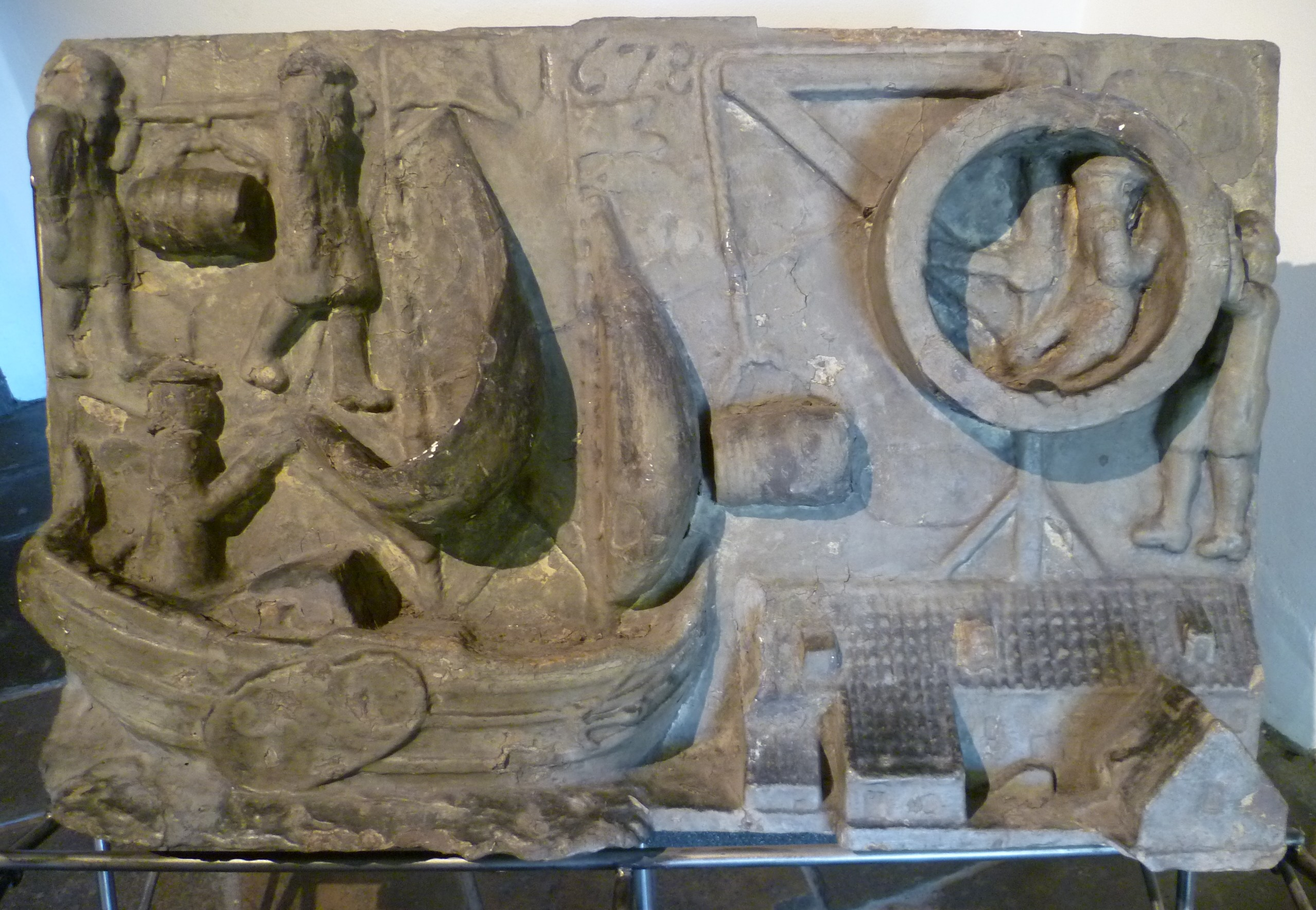
The 'Porters Stone' from a 17th-century wine-merchant's house

- Wine and whisky storage – wine storage in Leith dates from at least the early 16th century, notably being connected with the Vaults on Henderson Street from this time. At its peak there were around 100 warehouses storing wine and brandy. In the late 1880s, due to the collapse of wine harvest in Europe, most of these were "converted" for the storage of whisky used in the growing business of whisky blending and bottling. Important in this business were William Sanderson with Vat 69, John Crabbie who also produced green ginger wine, and Macdonald & Muir who later bought the Glenmorangie distillery. Around 85 bonded warehouses stood in Leith in the 1960s. The last bond, on Water Street, closed around 1995. An offshoot to the wine industry were several vinegar works.
- Lime juice – Rose's lime juice was founded by Lachlan Rose in Leith on Commercial Street in 1868. This was originally and primarily focused upon provision of vitamin C to seamen.
- Shipbuilding – originally centred on the Water of Leith and limited in scale due to the shallow water, Leith's shipbuilding started to fade as vessels increased in size. Latterly Leith built specialised ship types: tugs, hotel ships, cable-layers etc. Whilst the most notable large shipyard (Henry Robb's) closed in 1983, this was technically outlived by a very small shipbuilder on Sheriff Brae (run by the Scottish Co-operative Society) which closed around 1988. The most notable ships built in Leith are the SS Sirius, one of the first steamships to cross the Atlantic, and SS Copenhagen, one of the largest rigged ships ever built. Robb's yard also made a great contribution to the RN and MN during the Second World War, building forty-two vessels for the Royal Navy, fourteen merchant ships and refitted and repaired nearly 3,000 ships of the Royal Navy and Merchant Navy. This means that one new ship was launched on an average every six weeks and a ship repaired every day of this long and bloody conflict. The RN list included Flower and Castle Class Corvettes and River, Loch and Bay Class Frigates.

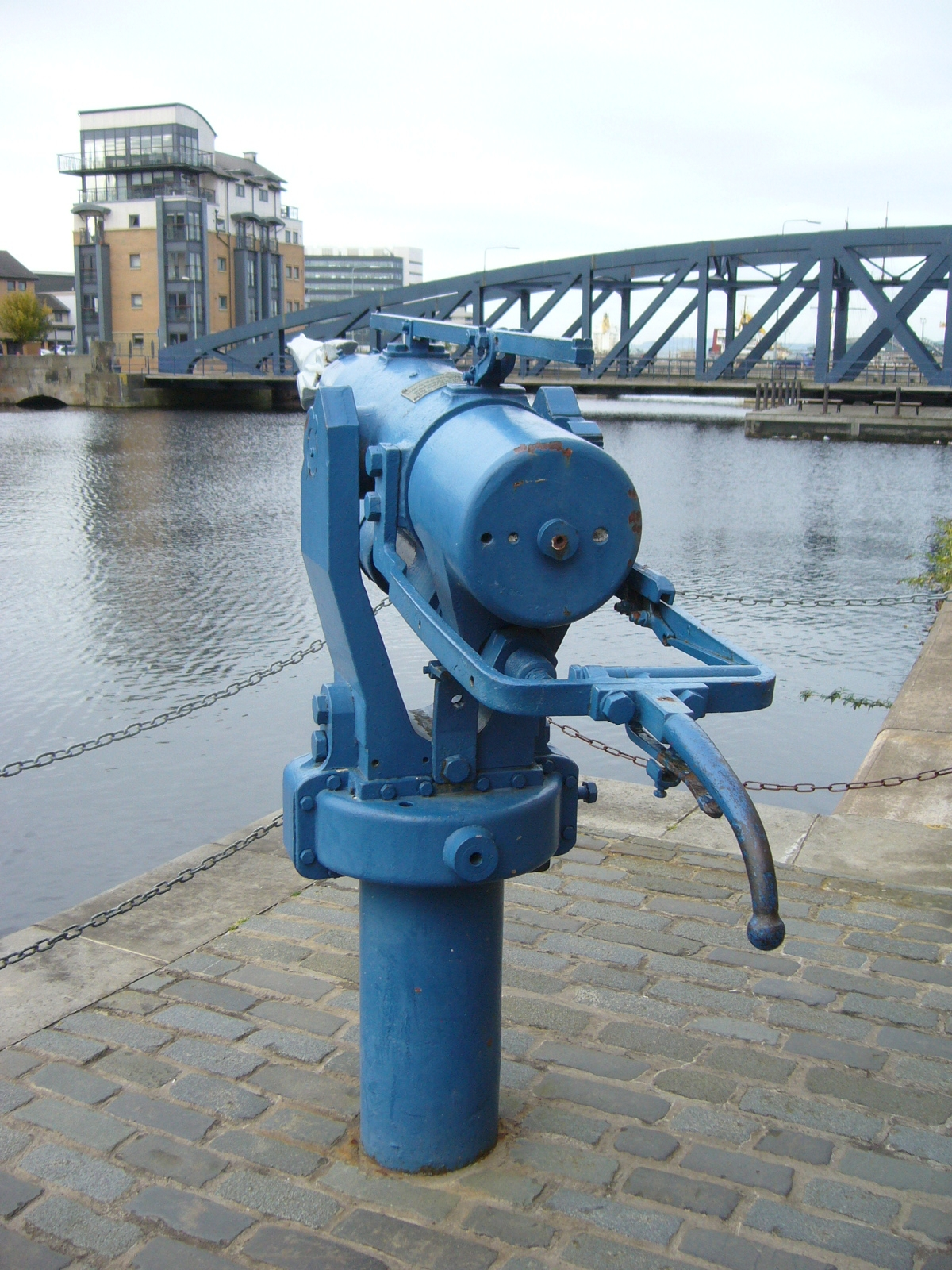
Christian Salvesen harpoon gun on The Shore

- Lead – Scotland's largest leadworks stood on the corner of Mitchell Street and Constitution Street. Founded around 1760 the operational part worked until the 1970s and the empty buildings stood until the late 1980s. The offices, on Constitution Street, still survive. The company specialised in lead pipes for water supply and lead drainpipes. They also produced lead sheet for roofing and lead shot for weapons.
- Sugar refining was developed at the Leith Sugar House by Robert Douglas, an established soap boiler, from 1677.
- Whaling – originally focussed on local, and Icelandic waters (the last whale in the Firth of Forth was caught in 1834); by the mid 19th century ships were travelling to the Antarctic. In the early 1900s, the Christian Salvesen company developed significant interests in whaling, initially in the Arctic, and then in the Antarctic. Among their many whaling stations in the South Atlantic, they established and operated from a base on the island of South Georgia, south east of the Falkland Islands at Leith Harbour (named for their base in Scotland). South Georgia later came to fame at the beginning of the Falklands War. The company moved from Leith to the Fettes area of Edinburgh around 1980 and then left Edinburgh altogether in the mid-1990s. The founder, Christian Salvesen is buried in Rosebank Cemetery. Whaling ships from Leith brought the very first penguins to Edinburgh Zoo around 1900.
- Corn trading – A Corn Exchange was erected in Constitution Street in 1861.
- Fishing – During the 19th century Leith became an important entrepôt for the Scottish herring trade, with exports peaking at 388,899 barrels in 1907.
- Ropemaking - The Edinburgh Roper & Sailcloth Co was founded in Leith in 1750, later expanding to wire ropes and cables

== Geography ==
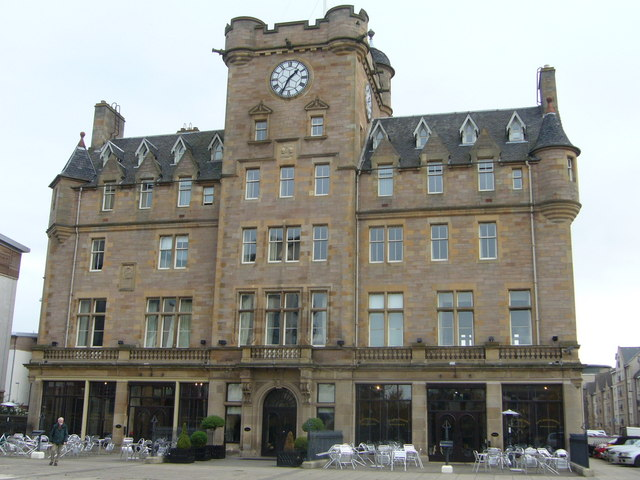
Former Seamen's Mission, now the Malmaison Hotel

After decades of industrial decline, deindustrialisation, slum clearance and resultant depopulation in the post-war era, Leith gradually began to enjoy an upturn in fortunes in the late 1980s. Several old industrial sites were developed with modest, affordable housing, while small industrial business units were constructed at Swanfield, Bonnington, Seafield and off Lindsay Road. The Shore developed a clutch of upmarket restaurants, including the first of the chain of Malmaison hotels in a conversion of a seamen's mission, whilst the once industrially-polluted and desolate banks of the Water of Leith were cleaned up and a public walkway opened.

Leith's gradual revival was also helped by the decision of the then Scottish Office to site their new offices in Leith Docks (just north of the old infilled East Dock). The site was chosen as part of a design-and-build competition against other sites at Haymarket and Marionville. It was completed in 1994. The hoped-for influx of well-paid civil service jobs failed to have much local impact as most commute to the office, and only a small percentage venture beyond the confines of the office during lunchtimes. It did further foster Leith's growing reputation as a white-collar, small business location. Further large-scale service and tourist development followed, including Ocean Terminal and the permanently moored Royal Yacht Britannia.

The Edinburgh Trams light rail line extension, from the city centre to Newhaven opened to passengers in June 2023 providing Leith and the new dock developments with a fast and convenient route for both local commuters and visitors.

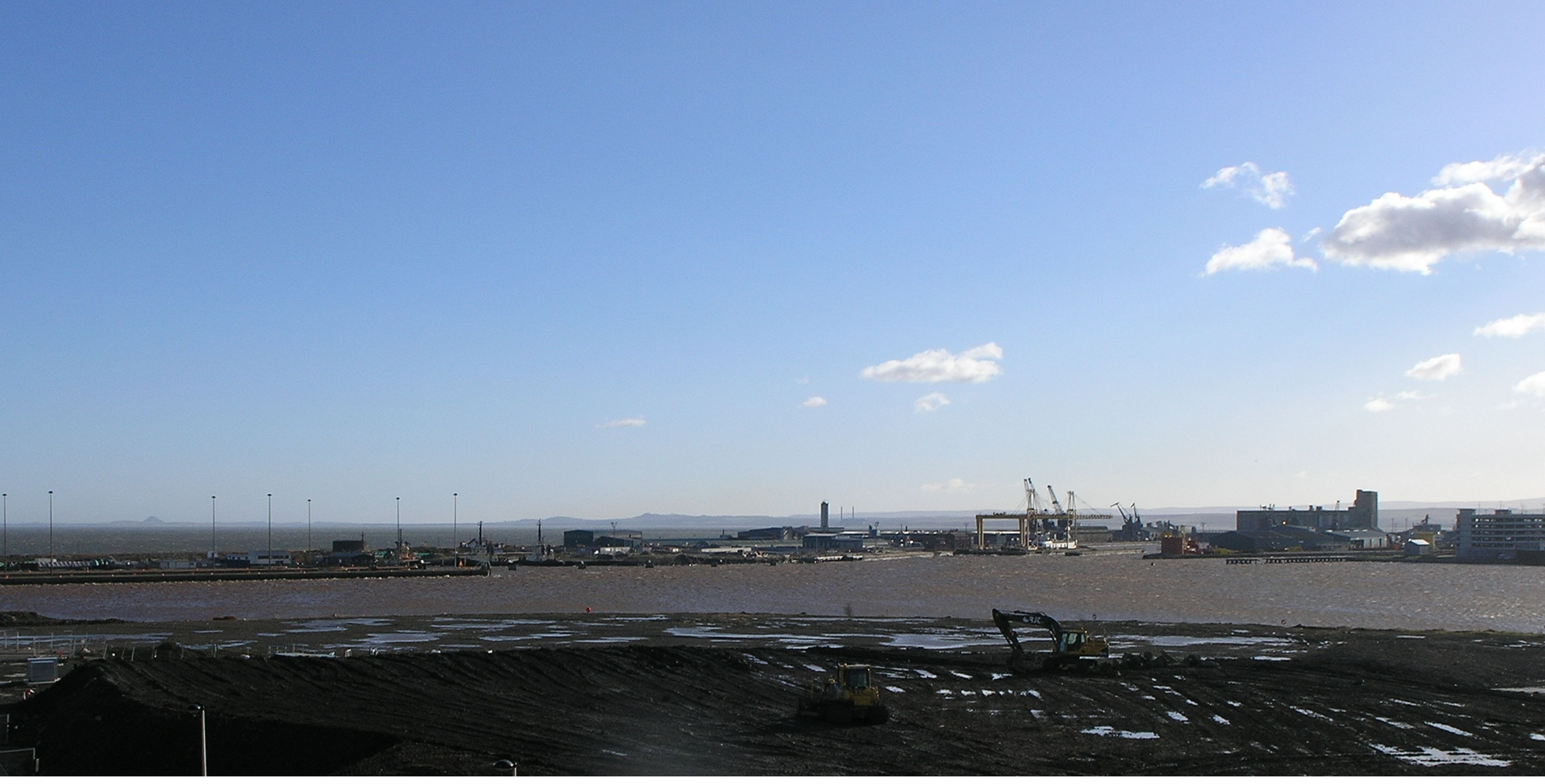
Western Harbour

In 2004 the owner of the docks, Forth Ports, announced plans to eventually close the port and carry out a major redevelopment of the area. The planned development, which was given supplementary planning guidance by the City of Edinburgh Council in 2004, was a small town with up to 17,000 new homes.

=== Area ===
One of the areas is Timber Bush which was originally used as a timber market.

Until its amalgamation with Edinburgh in 1920, the southern-most town border was the middle of Pilrig Street.

Expansion in the Georgian era gave rise to streets such as Queen Charlotte Street, named after Charlotte, the consort of George III.

== Religion ==
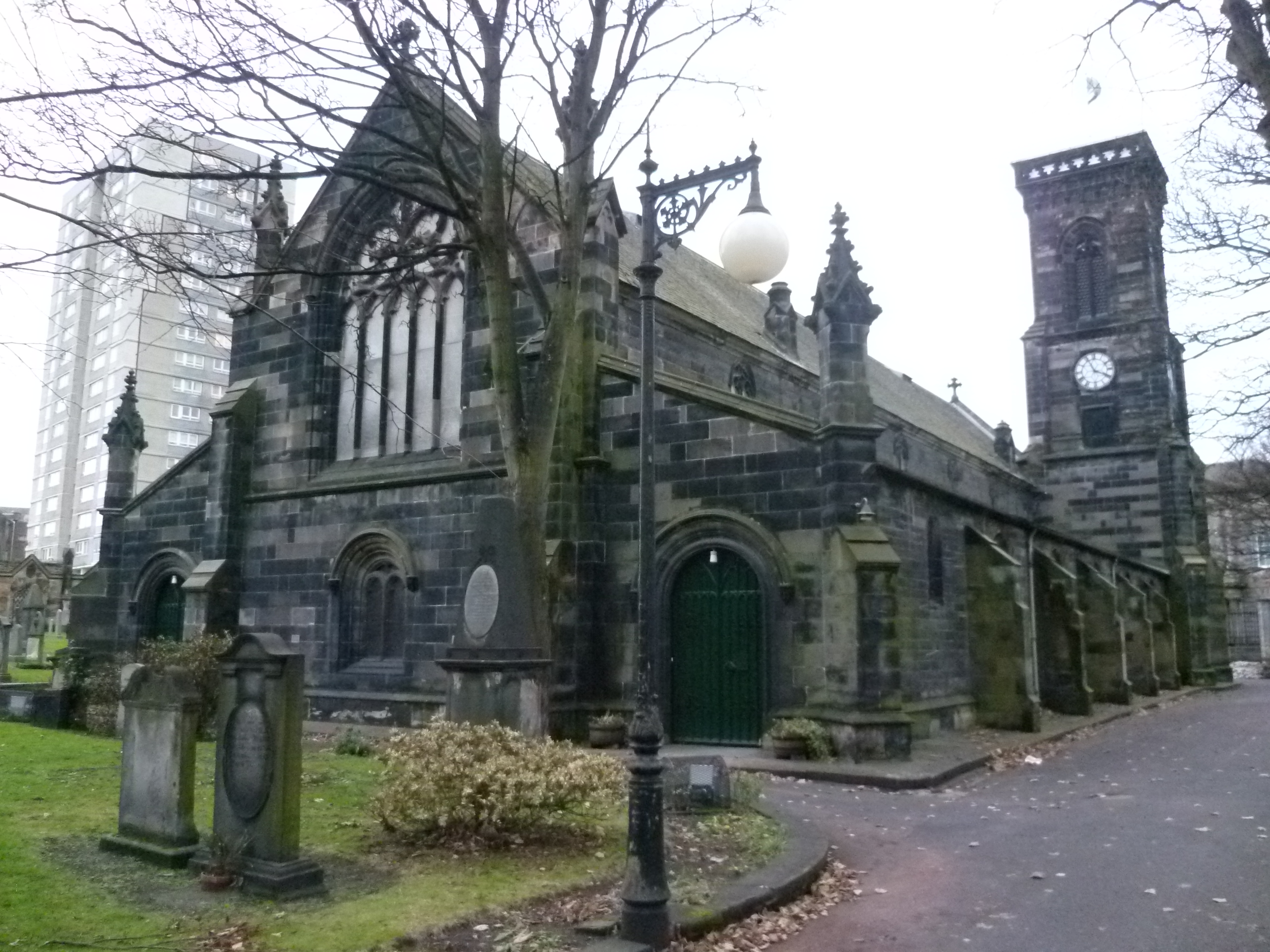
South Leith Parish Kirk

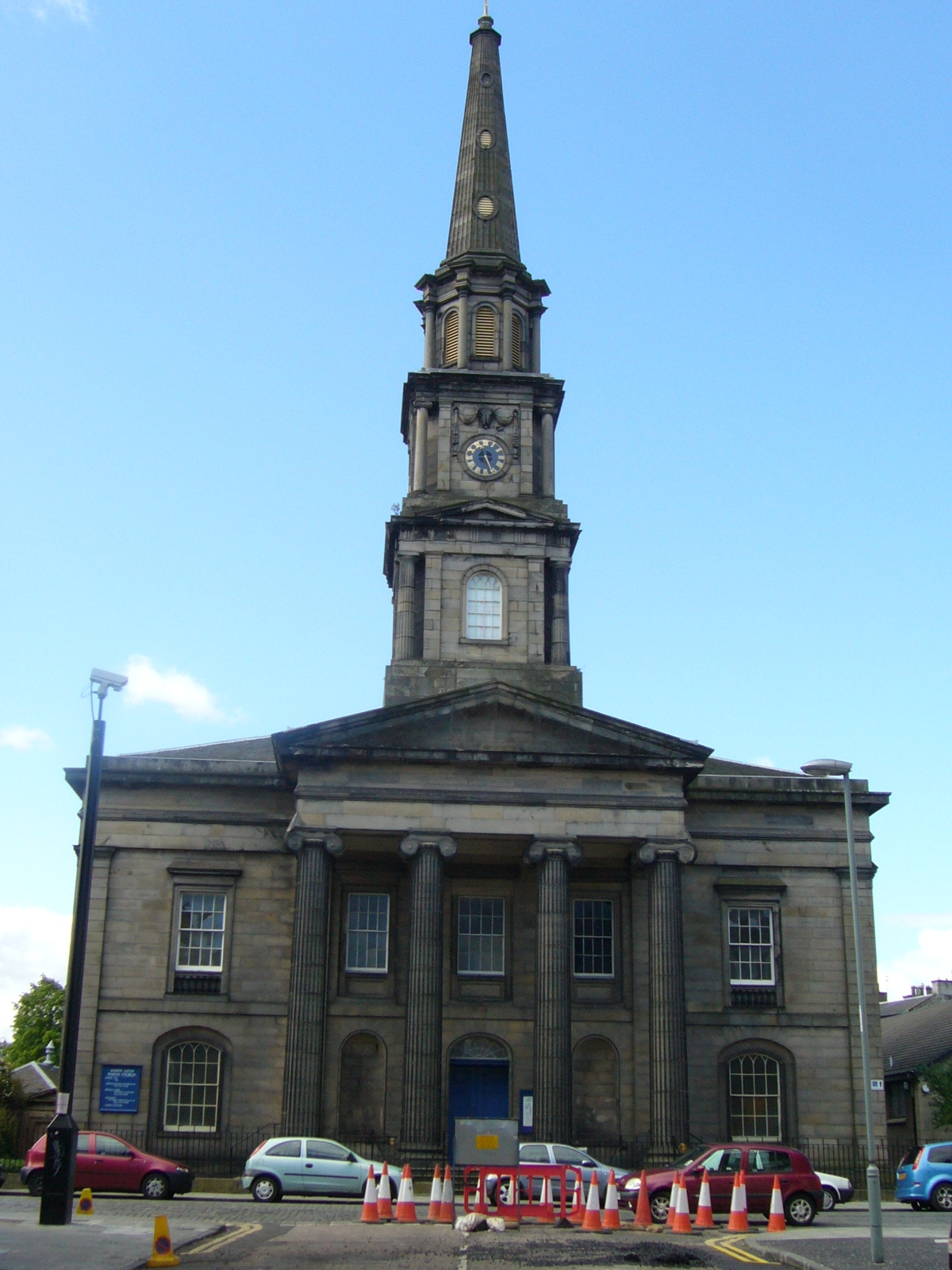
North Leith Parish Kirk

Historically, due its Catholic connections (and French garrison), Leith was one of the last towns to have Catholic sympathies post-Reformation. Although the preceptory (small monastery) of St Anthony's was destroyed soon after 1560 the other churches were quickly adapted to Protestant use. There was also an Episcopalian meeting house near Kapple's Wynd (later renamed Cables Wynd) from 1688, somewhat inexplicably called the John Knox Church. The church was active from 1688 and was last used by a visit of John Wesley but the huge crowd he drew was too large to fit. Bishop Robert Forbes, author of the Lyon in Mourning had an Episcopal meeting house in Leith for almost forty years until his death in 1775.

Leith still has several notable historic churches, including North Leith Parish Church and South Leith Parish Church (both of the Church of Scotland), and the Roman Catholic St Mary's Star of the Sea. The area has Sikh and Hindu temples, a Shia imambargah, a Sunni mosque and community centre, a Pentecostal centre and a Ukrainian Greek Catholic church. It also has a former Norwegian church, which is home now to the Leith School of Art.

As of 2011 (the most recent Census for which data is available), the religious composition of Leith was as follows:

Religion in Leith (2011)
1. Not religious (48.9%)
2. Church of Scotland (18.5%)
3. Catholic Church (15.0%)
4. Other Christian (5.80%)
5. Islam (2.40%)
6. Other religions (2.40%)
7. Not stated (7.00%)

== Transport ==
A regular stage coach service ran between Bernard Street and Edinburgh's Old Town from the mid-18th century. By 1863, it had become a horse-drawn omnibus running every 5 minutes from 9 am to 10 pm. It was put on tracks sometime around 1880 becoming a horse-drawn tram. Leith was the first town in Scotland to electrify its tram system (1905). Leith Corporation Tramways were merged into Edinburgh Corporation Tramways as part of the 1920 merger of the two burgh councils. Tram services ran until 1956, being replaced by buses due to the contemporary perception of their greater flexibility.

Leith had a horse-drawn rail line, dating from the mid-18th century, which brought coal from Dalkeith to a station at the north end of Constitution Street to serve the glassworks there. Steam-hauled trains arrived in the 1840s, and those lines were some of the earliest in Britain. When the railways were at their height, Leith had four passenger stations and many goods stations. However, in the 1960s, the Beeching report recommended the closure of almost all of Leith's railway infrastructure. Today, only one freight line, connecting to the dock, remains in use.

Although there are no longer any passenger rail trains serving Leith, two station buildings partially remain:

- Leith Central, on the corner of Leith Walk and Duke Street. The station clock, offices and public house (Central Bar) remain.
- Leith Citadel, on Commercial Street. The building is now a youth centre.

The SS Sirius, built in Leith, beat the SS Great Western by one day in being the first steamship to cross the Atlantic but, as a much smaller ship, was eclipsed by the press coverage given to the larger vessel. Leith offered ferry services to many European ports, including Hamburg and Oslo.

Today, Leith is served by various bus routes run by Lothian Buses, and a tram service provided by Edinburgh Trams. The tram service was due commence in 2011 but, owing to construction and funding problems, completion of the section to Leith and Newhaven was delayed. It was finally opened just after midday on 7 June 2023, with Leith stops at Balfour Street (Leith Walk), Foot of the Walk (Constitution Street), The Shore (Constitution Street), Port of Leith and Ocean Terminal.

== Culture and community ==
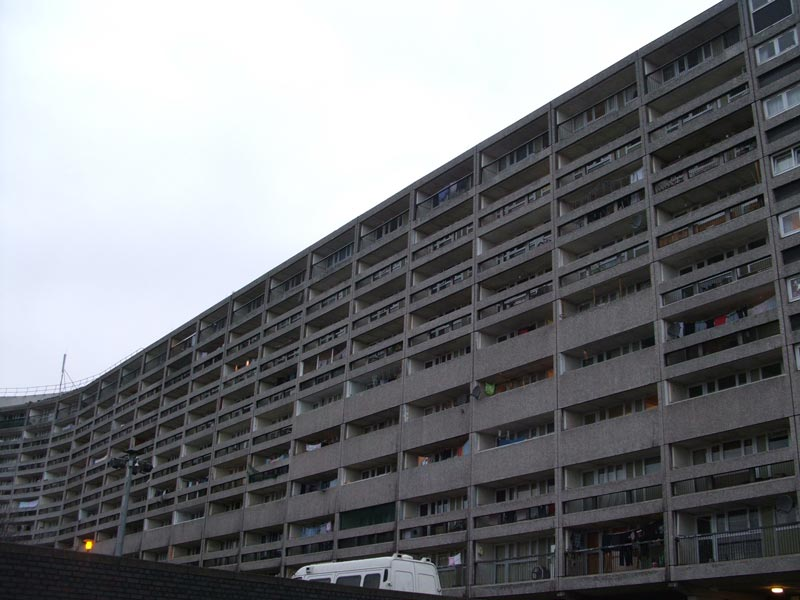
The Leith 'Banana Flats'

Leith has a long history of pioneering social advances, some of which were the first of their kind in Scotland:

All boys were educated for free from 1555 onwards. This was paid for by the local trade guilds. All girls were educated from 1820, a long time after the boys, but a very early example of free education for females (only required by law from 1876). A free hospital service was provided from 1777, paid for by a local tax, with beds sponsored by local shops. Leith had electric street lighting from 1890 and electric trams from 1905 (only Blackpool was earlier in the UK). The first public sewer in Scotland was built in Bernard Street in 1780; this flowed into the Water of Leith.

Leith was formerly a port linked to the trade of the Hanseatic League.

Leith is also home to The Queen's former floating Royal residence, the Royal Yacht Britannia, now a five-star visitor attraction and evening events venue permanently berthed at the Ocean Terminal shopping centre.

Leith was named as the fourth "coolest neighbourhood in the world" by Time Out in 2021.

The Port of Leith distillery, is the United Kingdom's only vertical whisky distillery.

=== Educational establishments ===
Leith is home to Leith Academy, one of the oldest schools in Scotland, and to the Leith School of Art, which along with Glasgow School of Art is one of only two independent art schools in Scotland.

From 1855 until 1987, Leith Nautical College provided training for Merchant Navy seafarers in Scotland.

=== Media and art ===
Festivals occur throughout the year, including Leith Festival, Leith Late festival, PLU Parents Like Us and the Edinburgh Mela on Leith Links, part of the Edinburgh Festival since 2010. The Leith Gala, now known as Leith Festival Gala Day is an annual event that has taken place since 1907; it was originally a charity event to raise sponsorship for local hospital beds before the National Health came into place. It has developed into the community-based Leith Festival.

Leith houses a notable number of cultural arts studios and small independent businesses, including the Leith Theatre on Ferry Road, Leith School of Art in North Junction Street, WASP Studios by The Shore and Out of the Blue in the former Dalmeny Street drill hall.

Leith FM (later renamed Castle FM) started as a week-long RSL station during the late 1990s, linked to Leith Festival. A few years of annual 28-day broadcasts later, the station bid for and won a permanent community radio licence and broadcast for several years on 98.8 FM and online. In December 2013, Leith Dockers Club locked the station out of its rented premises, due to the "substantial" debt it was owed by the station, and the future of the station is currently in doubt.

=== In popular culture ===
Scottish folk rock duo The Proclaimers titled their second album Sunshine on Leith after the town, including the eponymous track. This spawned a musical of the same name that included music from The Proclaimers, which itself had a film adaptation in 2013.

Irvine Welsh had his Channel 4 drama Wedding Belles (2007) filmed in Henderson Street. Welsh's novel Trainspotting and its prequel, Skagboys concern a group of drug users living in the Leith area in the 1980s.

The BBC drama Guilt is set in Leith, with filming locations including the Eastern Cemetery. The show is written by Neil Forsyth, a former Leith resident and stars Mark Bonnar and Jamie Sives both of whom attended Leith Academy.

The BBC Radio 4 drama series McLevy features stories loosely based upon the historical figure James McLevy who operated in Leith crime hotspots amongst other locations in Edinburgh.

== Ethnicity ==
Ethnicity based on 2022 census data
| | Leith Ward | Leith Walk Ward | Edinburgh |
|---|---|---|---|
| White | 86.8% | 83.2% | 84.9% |
| Asian | 5.9% | 9.6% | 8.6% |
| African/Caribbean | 2.1% | 1.6% | 2.1% |
| Mixed/Other | 5.2% | 5.5% | 4.4% |

== Sport ==
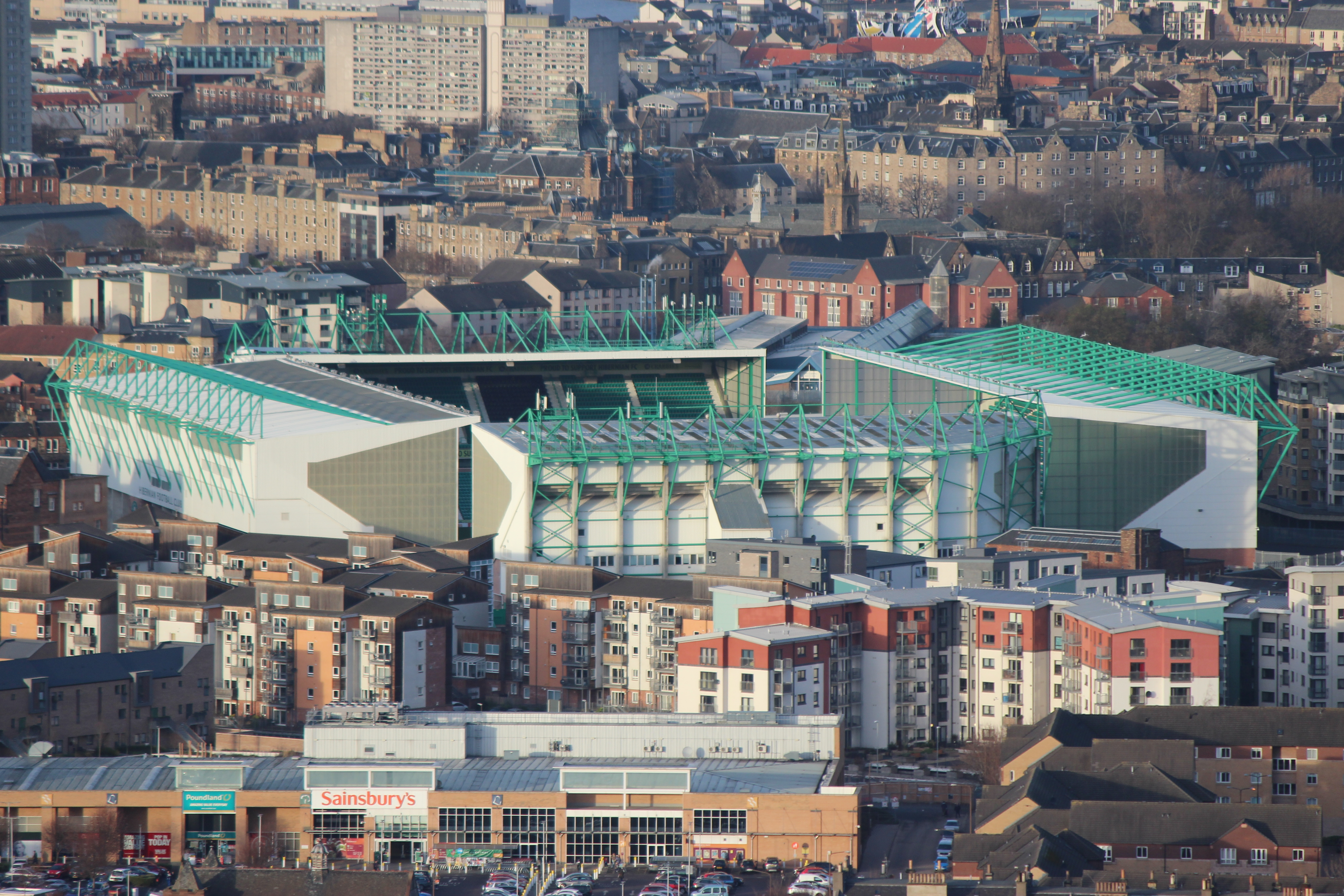
Easter Road Stadium, near Easter Road

Leith is the home of Hibernian Football Club which is a member of the Scottish Premiership.

Leith Athletic Football Club have been part of Leith's sporting culture since their foundation in 1887 until closure in 1955. Reformed in 1996 they amalgamated with Edinburgh Athletic in 2008 and achieved promotion to the East of Scotland Premier Division in 2011. They host home games at Peffermill 3G.

Leith Links have been used a sports and recreation area over many centuries.

Leith is significant in the historical development of the rules of golf, as the Honourable Company of Edinburgh Golfers played there before moving to Musselburgh Links and later Muirfield. The official rules of golf, initially formulated at Leith in 1744, were later adopted by the Royal and Ancient Golf Club of St Andrews. The only difference introduced with those rules (which remain the rules of golf) was the omission of one rule to do with hazards such as trenches.

From at least 1600 until 1816, Leith Races were held on Leith Sands, an area immediately north of the present Links and now built over. They were long regarded as one of Scotland's most important horse race meetings before racing moved to Musselburgh permanently from 1816 onwards.

Leith Links also have one of the longest established cricket pitches in Scotland, from 1820.

The Leith Victoria Swim Centre on Junction Place opened in 1899.

== Former provosts ==
- Adam White (1760–1843), served 1833–1839
- James Reoch (1768–1845), served 1839–1845
- Thomas Hutchison (1796–1852), served 1845–1848
- George Adiston McLaren (1801–1881), served 1848–1851
- Robert Philip (d.1887), served 1851–1855
- James Taylor (1800–1890), served 1855–1860
- William Lindsay (1819–1884), served 1860–1866
- James Watt (1806–1881), served 1866–1875
- Dr John Henderson (1818–1901), served 1875–1881, instigated the Leith Improvement Plan and creator of Henderson Street
- James Pringle (1822–1886), served 1881–1886
- Dr John Henderson (1818–1901), served second term 1886–1887 following Pringle's death in office
- Thomas Aitken (1833–1912), served 1887–1893
- John Bennet (1820–1902), served 1893–1899
- Sir Richard Mackie (1851–1923), served 1899–1908
- Malcolm Smith (1856–1935), served 1908–1917
- John Allan Lindsay (1865–1942), served 1917–1920, the final Provost of Leith

== Notable residents ==
- William Lindsay Alexander (1808–1884), theologian
- Thomas Anderson (1819–1874), chemist
- John Armstrong (1771–1797), journalist and poet
- Adam Archibald (1879–1957), World War I recipient of the Victoria Cross
- Hugo Arnot (1749–1786), historian, buried in South Leith churchyard
- Andrew Barton (c. 1466–1511), privateer, Lord High Admiral of Scotland
- Robert Barton (died 1540), brother of the above, privateer and Lord High Treasurer of Scotland
- Edith Marian Begbie (1866–1932), militant suffragette and member of the WSPU
- Walter Leonard Bell (1865–1932) surgeon and antiquarian
- Kenneth Borthwick (1915–2017) Lord Provost of Edinburgh 1977–80, Chairman of the 1986 Commonwealth Games.
- Sir Thomas Jamieson Boyd (1818–1902), Lord Provost of Edinburgh 1877–1882
- Eric "Winkle" Brown (1919–2016), test pilot of a record number of aircraft types
- James Brown (1907 – unknown), footballer
- Ken Buchanan (1945–2023), Undisputed Lightweight Champion of the World
- Paddy Buckley (1925–2008), footballer
- Ian Charleson (1949–1990), stage and screen actor
- John Cheyne (1777–1836), surgeon
- John Chisholm (fl. 1560s), keeper of royal artillery at the King's Wark
- John Coldstream (1806–1863), physician
- Malcolm Ross, musician
- James Scarth Combe (1796–1883), surgeon (first to describe pernicious anaemia)
- David Cousin (1809–1878), architect
- John Crabbie founder of Crabbie's on Great Junction Street
- David Craigie (1793–1866) medical author
- Professor Ernest Cruickshank (1888–1964)nutritionist, and twin brother, Brigadier Martin Melvin Cruickshank (also 1888–1964)
- Helen Crummy (1920–2011), founder of Craigmillar Festival Society for the local community
- Robert James Blair Cunynghame (1841–1903) physiologist and forensic scientist
- James Currie (1863–1930) President of the Royal Society of Edinburgh, shipowner and shipbuilder, proprietor of James Currie & Co and the Currie Line (shipping)
- Gordon Donaldson (1913–1993), historian
- Frank Doran, Labour (1949–2017) politician
- Handyside Edgar (1754–1806), physician
- Sir Tom Farmer, founder of Kwik-Fit and former owner of Hibernian F.C.
- Robert Forbes, Episcopalian Bishop and author of the Lyon in Mourning
- Dick Gaughan, folk singer
- John Gibson Gibson (1889–1970) physicist and mathematician
- Robert Gilchrist (1821–1905), first-class cricketer
- Dr George Ritchie Gilruth (1842–1921) surgeon
- John Gladstone (1754–1861), MP and father of William Ewart Gladstone
- Professor John Russell Greig (1889–1963) Director of the Moredun Research Institute
- Tallulah Greive, actress
- Leigh Griffiths, footballer
- John Hall (1559–1627), Moderator of the General Assembly of the Church of Scotland, minister of Leith for a time
- Sir Peter Heatly (1924–2015), springboard and platform diver
- John Home (1722–1808), poet and dramatist
- John Hughes (born 1964), football manager formerly of Falkirk F.C. and Hibernian F.C.
- Vice Admiral John Hunter (1737–1821), second Governor of New South Wales
- Russell Hunter (1925–2004), actor
- James Campbell Irons (1840–1910) legal author and historian, author of The Antiquities of Leith
- Robert Jameson (1774–1854), naturalist and mineralogist
- William Jameson (1815–1882), botanist responsible for the promotion of tea-growing in northern India
- Captain William Johnston VC (1879–1915), recipient of the Victoria Cross
- Dr George Kellie (1720–1779) surgeon, and his grandson Dr George Kellie (1781–1829)
- Dr Thomas Latta (1796–1833) inventor of saline drip
- Tancy Lee (1882–1941) boxer
- David Lindsay (1531–1615), chaplain of James VI of Scotland and Bishop of Ross, buried here
- Jack Lowden, Scottish actor
- Harold Mahony (1867–1905), Irish tennis player who had a home at Dalmore Lodge in Leith
- Sam McCluskie (1932–1995), Labour politician and trade unionist
- Andrew Macdonald (poet) (1757–1790) born at the foot of Leith Walk
- Very Rev Robert MacDonald (1813–1893) minister of North Leith Free Church, Moderator of the General Assembly of the Free Church of Scotland 1882/83.
- Una McLean MBE, actor
- Willie Merrilees OBE QPM (1898–1984), lifesaver and distinguished policeman, later Chief Constable of the Lothians and Peebles Constabulary
- Alexander Morgan (1860–1946)
- James Morton (1885–1926), footballer
- Thomas Morton (1781–1832), shipbuilder and inventor (the patent slip)
- Erskine Nicol (1825–1904) artist
- Eduardo Paolozzi (1924–2005) artist
- Charlie and Craig Reid of folk band The Proclaimers
- George T. H. Reid, Moderator of the General Assembly of the Church of Scotland 1973/4
- Henry Robb (1874–1951), shipbuilder
- J.K. Rowling, author
- Clarice Shaw (1883–1946), pioneering woman Labour politician and MP
- Margery Sampson (1890–1915) Scotland’s first female bell-ringer
- James Simpson (1830–1894) architect, creator of the Leith Improvement Scheme
- John Sligo of Carmyle (1794–1858) merchant and amateur geologist
- Chris Small, professional snooker player
- Neil Smith (1954–2012), geographer
- Ralph Stockman (1861–1946) and his younger brother Stewart Stockman (1869–1926)
- William Struth (1875–1956), football manager with Rangers FC (1920–1954)
- Danny Swanson, footballer with Peterborough United
- Derek Trail (born 1946), Scottish former professional footballer
- Unicorn Kid (Oliver Sabin, born 1991), electronic music/chip music composer
- Irvine Welsh, author, Trainspotting

== See also ==
- Mercantilism
- Cleanse the Causeway

== Bibliography ==
- Campbell, Alex (1827). The History of Leith, from the Earliest Accounts to the Present Period. Leith: William Reid & Son.
- Gilbert, W.M., ed. (1901), Edinburgh in the Nineteenth Century
- Grant, James. Old and New Edinburgh. Vol. VI.
- Marshall, J. M. (1986). The Life and Times of Leith. John Donald. ISBN 978-085976-128-4.
- Neish, R. O. (2020). They Once Were Shipbuilders Leith-Built Ships Vol. I (Paperback). Dunbeath, Scotland: Whittles Publishing. ISBN 978-184995-443-3.
- Neish, R. O. (2021). Leith Shipyards 1918–1939 Leith Built Ships, Vol. II (Paperback). Dunbeath, Scotland: Whittles Publishing. ISBN 978-184995-481-5.
