= Chub Watson =

American basketball player (1915–1971)

Personal information
- Born: June 5, 1915 Jane Lew, West Virginia, U.S.
- Died: June 28, 1971 (aged 56) West Virginia, U.S.
- Listed height: 6 ft 2 in (1.88 m)

Career information
- High school: Jane Lew (Jane Lew, West Virginia)
- College: Davis & Elkins (1934–1935); Marshall (1935–1938)
- Playing career: 1938–1941
- Position: Center

Career history

Playing
- 1938: Pittsburgh Pirates
- 1940–1941: Clarksburgh Oilers

Coaching
- 1940–1941: Clarksburgh Oilers

Charles F. "Chub" Watson (April 5, 1915 – June 28, 1971) was an American professional basketball player. He played college basketball for Davis & Elkins College and Marshall University, as well as baseball and football for Marshall. Watson then played in the National Basketball League for the Pittsburgh Pirates in only one game during the 1938–39 season and scored 16 points.
