= Jesse Run =

Stream in West Virginia, U.S.

Coordinates: 39°06′05″N 80°23′35″W

Jesse Run is a stream in the U.S. state of West Virginia.

Jesse Run was named after Jesse Hughes, a pioneer settler.

== See also ==
- List of rivers of West Virginia
