= George Ritchie Gilruth =

Scottish surgeon and author

Dr George Ritchie Gilruth FRSE LRCP LRCSE (24 October 1842 – 15 August 1921) was a Scottish surgeon and author.

== Life ==
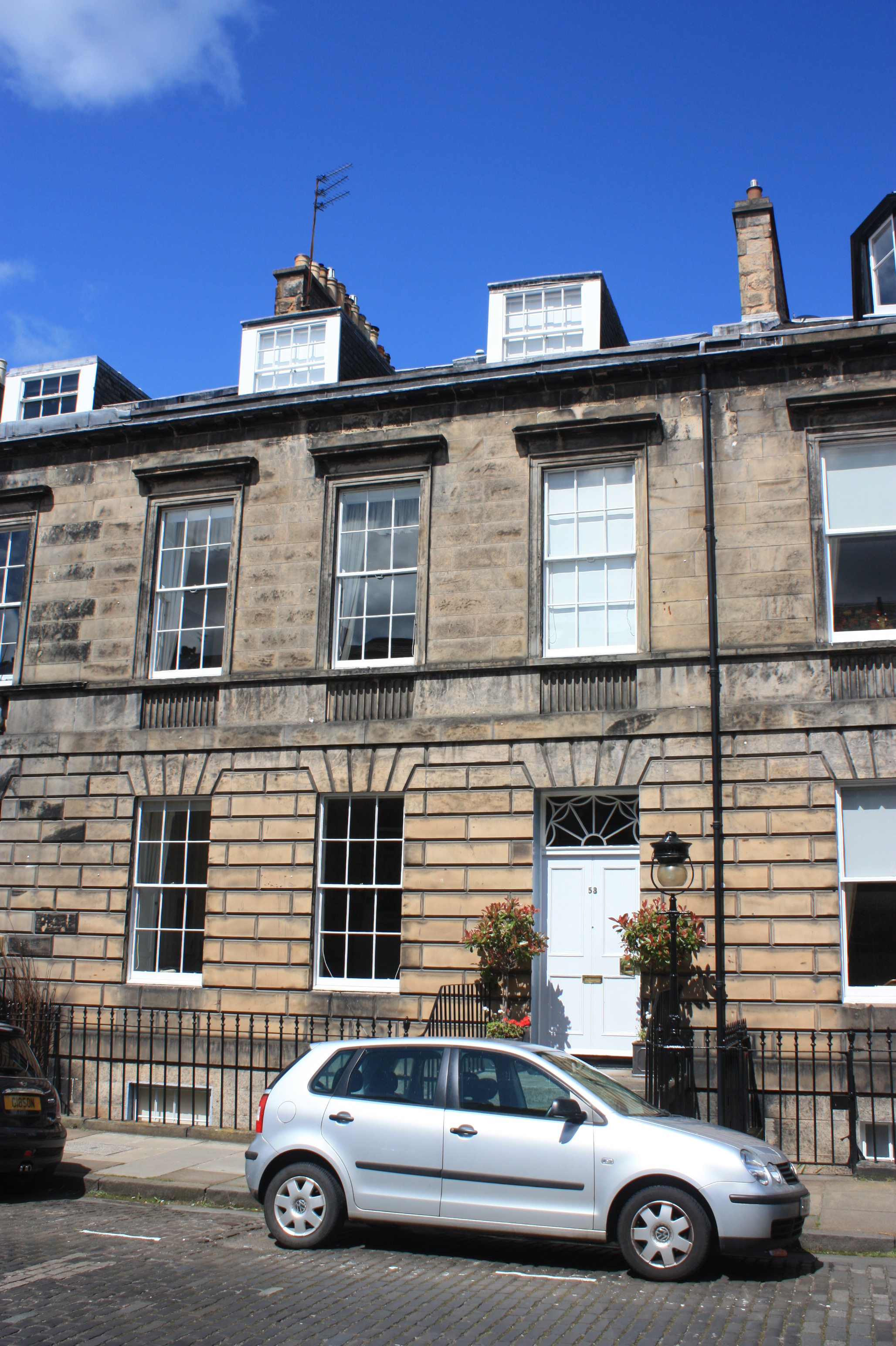
53 Northumberland Street, Edinburgh

He was born on 24 October 1842 the son of Eliza Ritchie and John, writing master in Leith just north of Edinburgh and living at 28 Constitution Street. He is presumed to have studied medicine at the University of Edinburgh. He qualified as a surgeon in 1865.

In 1877 he was living at 9 Union Street in Edinburgh and is noted as a qualified surgeon. He was a demonstrator in anatomy at the Royal College of Surgeons of Edinburgh. In 1880 he was elected a Fellow of the Royal Society of Edinburgh. His proposers were William Ferguson, Andrew Douglas Maclagan, Patrick Heron Watson and Thomas Alexander Goldie Balfour.

In June 1888 he is noted as an acting surgeon in the Edinburgh City Artillery Volunteer Corps. He was then living at 48 Northumberland Street.

In 1911 he is noted as living at 53 Northumberland Street in Edinburgh's New Town.

He later worked as resident surgeon at Consett Infirmary in the north of England.

He died at Allanton near Bridge of Allan, Stirlingshire, on 15 August 1921.
