= Lifes Run =

Stream in West Virginia, U.S.

Coordinates: 39°05′11″N 80°23′32″W

Lifes Run is a stream in the U.S. state of West Virginia.

Lifes Run was named after John Life, a pioneer settler.

== See also ==
- List of rivers of West Virginia
