= May H. Gilruth =

American painter

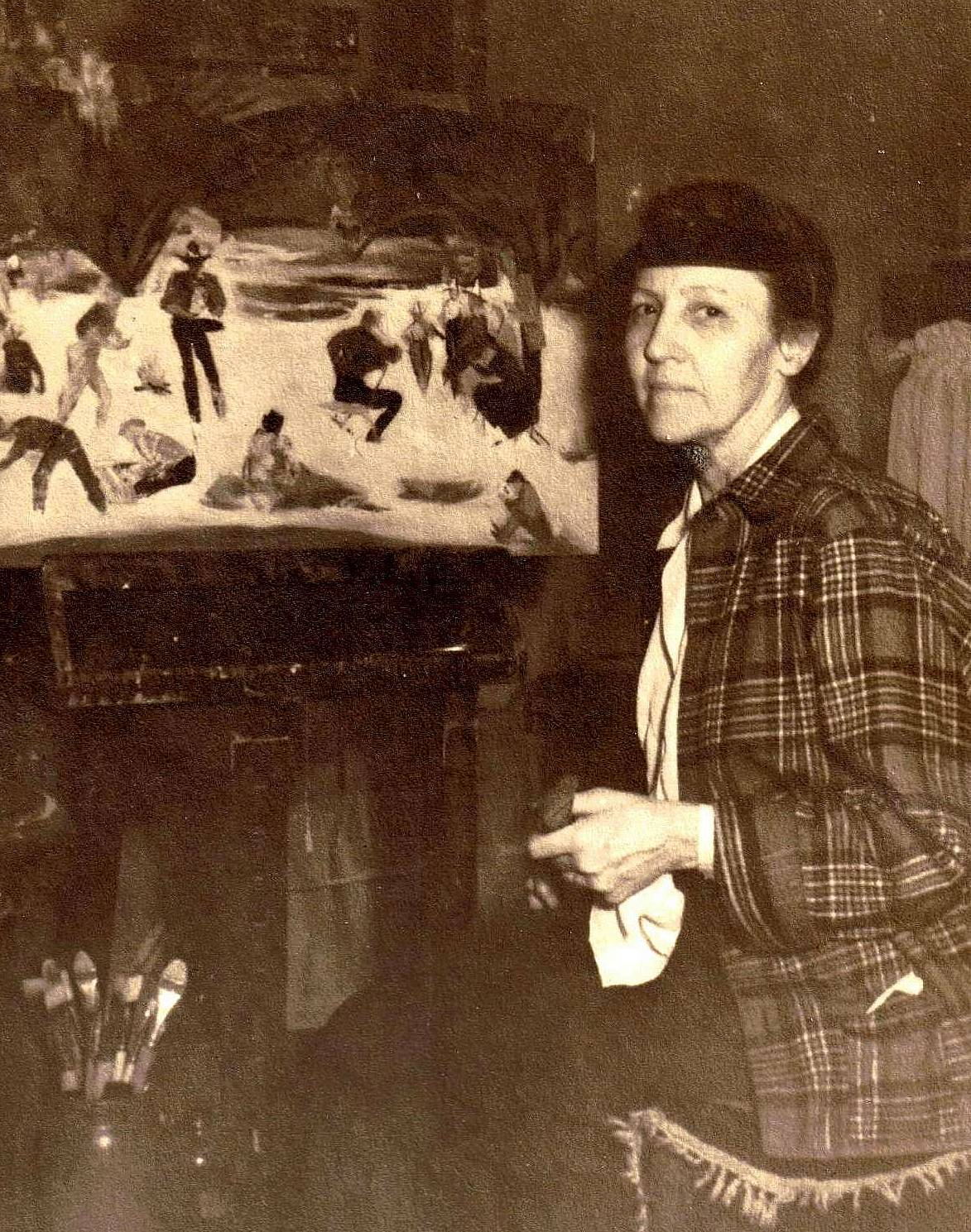
- May Gilruth in her Chicago studio
- Born: Anna May Hardman; July 19, 1885; Jane Lew, West Virginia
- Died: October 23, 1962 (aged 74); Chicago, Illinois
- Known for: Painting
- Spouse: Irwin T. Gilruth (m. 1917)

May H. Gilruth (July 19, 1885 – October 23, 1962) was an American artist/painter.

== Personal background ==
She was born Anna May Hardman in Jane Lew, West Virginia. She disliked her given first name Anna and never used it. She married Irwin T. Gilruth in 1917 and had two children.

She died in Chicago, Illinois on October 23, 1962.

== Career ==
Gilruth worked primarily in pencil, watercolors, woodcuts and oil paints. She was most active in the 1930s to the 1950s, appearing in four major exhibitions, including The Art Institute of Chicago in 1945. She was a member of the National Association of Women Artists, Washington, DC.

== Partial list of Exhibitions ==
- Annual Exhibition of Works by Chicago and Vicinity Artists, AIC, 1934–44.
- International Water Color Exhibition, AIC, 1935
- American Watercolor Society, NYC, 1937
- National Association of Women Painters & Sculptors, 1938
- Watercolor Annual, Pennsylvania Academy of Fine Arts, Philadelphia, 1939

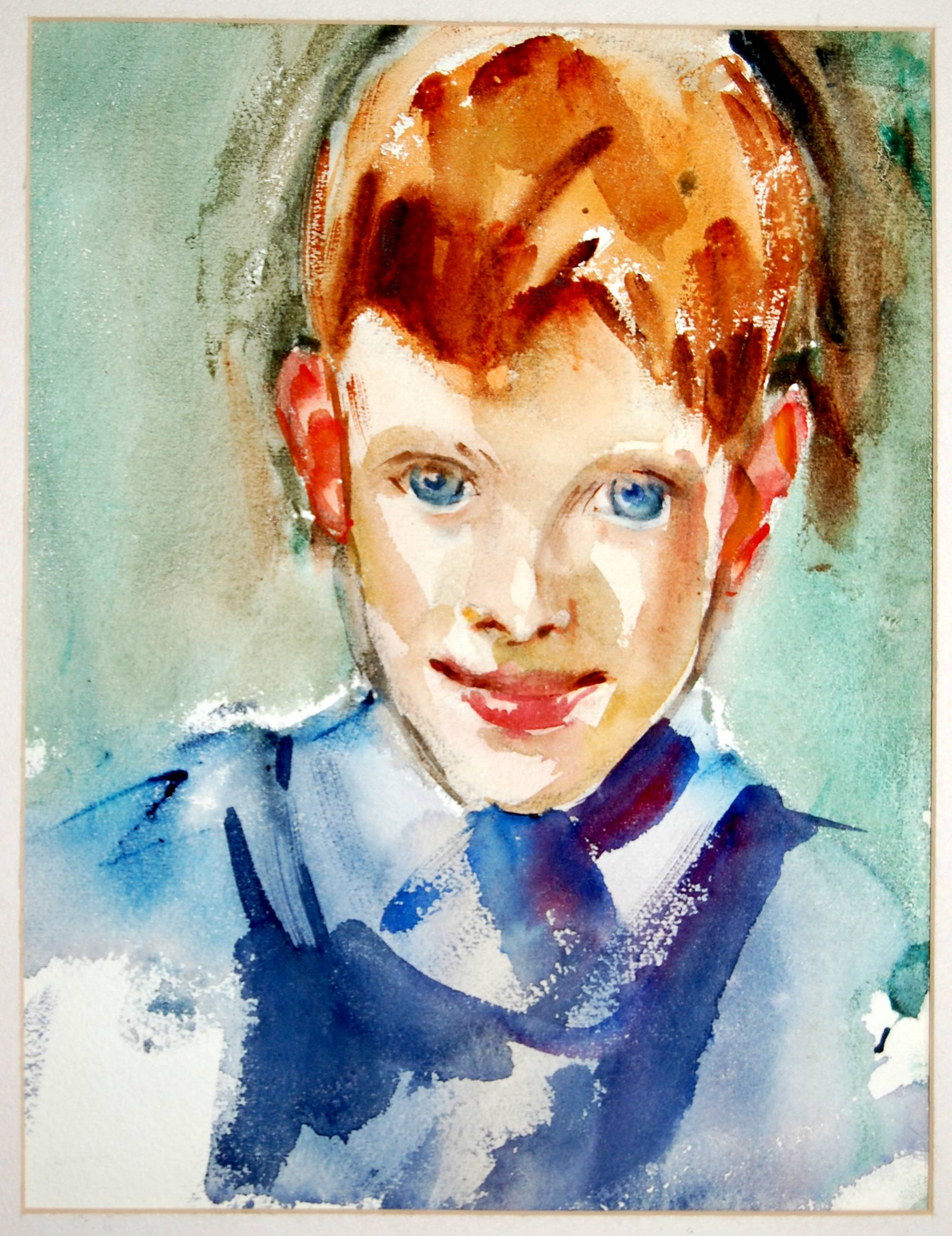
West Virginia Mountain Boy, watercolor
