= List of listed buildings in Edinburgh/23 =

This is a list of listed buildings in Edinburgh, Scotland.

== List ==
Name	Location	Date Listed	Grid Ref. (Note: Sometimes known as OSGB36, the grid reference (where provided) is based on the British national grid reference system used by the Ordnance Survey. • "Guide to National Grid". Ordnance Survey. • "Get-a-map". Ordnance Survey.)	Geo-coordinates	Notes	LB Number (Note: Historic Environment Scotland assign a unique alphanumeric identifier to each designated site in Scotland, for listed buildings this always begins with "LB", for example "LB12345".)	Image
27-33 (Odd Nos) Regent Street (Marionville)				55°57′11″N 3°06′41″W	Category C(S)	27549	Upload Photo
65 Morningside Road, Flodden Lodge				55°55′54″N 3°12′34″W	Category C(S)	27561	Upload Photo
Maitland's Bridge, River Almond At Kirkliston				55°56′58″N 3°24′18″W	Category B	27563	Upload Photo
Newbridge Village, Bridge Street, Newbridge Inn				55°56′22″N 3°24′29″W	Category C(S)	27575	Upload Photo
28 Hermitage Gardens				55°55′17″N 3°12′29″W	Category B	27447	Upload Photo
26/1-6 Trafalgar Street (Former Lyon's Bakery); Eh6 4Df				55°58′27″N 3°11′08″W	Category C(S)	27450	Upload Photo
114 And 116 Portobello High Street				55°57′14″N 3°06′56″W	Category C(S)	27458	Upload Photo
Kirkliston Village, High Street, Parish Church Hall (Former Free Church)				55°57′16″N 3°24′07″W	Category B	27462	Upload Photo
Newhaven Main Street, Ruins Of St Mary And St James Chapel				55°58′50″N 3°11′45″W	Category B	27475	Upload Photo
Kirkliston Village, 17 High Street				55°57′15″N 3°24′05″W	Category C(S)	27485	Upload Photo
17 And 17A Jordan Lane				55°55′38″N 3°12′20″W	Category C(S)	27497	Upload Photo
39 And 41 (Formerly 29 And 31) Greenhill Gardens, Bowmont Tower				55°55′58″N 3°12′20″W	Category A	27366	Upload another image
Heriot-Watt University, Riccarton Estate, North Gate Lodge, Gatepiers And Screen Walls				55°55′01″N 3°19′16″W	Category A	27369	Upload Photo
38 Marlborough Street (Leven Lodge)				55°57′13″N 3°06′33″W	Category C(S)	27371	Upload Photo
7 And 9 Greenhill Park With Boundary Wall				55°56′01″N 3°12′29″W	Category C(S)	27380	Upload Photo
46 And 48 Portland Street With Boundary Walls; Eh6 4Ba				55°58′38″N 3°11′00″W	Category C(S)	27382	Upload Photo
31/1,2,3-33 (Odd Numbers) Spylaw Road				55°55′56″N 3°13′09″W	Category C(S)	27390	Upload Photo
52-60 (Even Nos) Portobello High Street				55°57′18″N 3°07′03″W	Category B	27438	Upload Photo
Ingliston House Lodge With Gatepiers And Boundary Walls				55°56′17″N 3°22′01″W	Category B	27443	Upload Photo
3-7 (Odd Nos) Marlborough Street				55°57′08″N 3°06′41″W	Category C(S)	27294	Upload Photo
9-19 (Odd Nos) Pitt Street With Railings And Lamp Standard; Eh6 4Bx				55°58′24″N 3°11′16″W	Category B	27298	Upload Photo
60 Constitution Street				55°58′28″N 3°10′04″W	Category B	27302	Upload Photo
3 And 5 Portland Place And 1-3 (Inclusive Nos) Portland Terrace With Railings; Eh6 6La And Eh6 6Lz Respectively				55°58′40″N 3°10′49″W	Category B	27312	Upload Photo
5 And 7 Polwarth Terrace				55°56′11″N 3°12′58″W	Category C(S)	27314	Upload another image
74 And 76 Constitution Street				55°58′27″N 3°10′04″W	Category C(S)	27316	Upload Photo
Gogar Station Road, Gogar Stables (Former Carriage Block)				55°55′59″N 3°19′47″W	Category C(S)	27320	Upload Photo
7 Greenhill Gardens				55°56′08″N 3°12′22″W	Category B	27338	Upload Photo
17 Greenhill Gardens, Hopefield, With Boundary Walls And Gatepiers				55°56′05″N 3°12′22″W	Category C(S)	27359	Upload Photo
83, 85 And 85A Colinton Road				55°55′48″N 3°13′19″W	Category C(S)	27219	Upload Photo
119 Constitution Street, St James's Church With Church Officer's House, Hall, Boundary Walls And Gatepiers				55°58′21″N 3°10′03″W	Category B	27226	Upload Photo
Montpelier Bruntsfield Primary School And Janitor's House				55°56′15″N 3°12′35″W	Category B	27238	Upload another image See more images
11 East Brighton Crescent				55°57′02″N 3°06′59″W	Category B	27239	Upload Photo
18 Corrennie Gardens				55°55′14″N 3°12′24″W	Category B	27241	Upload Photo
14-18 (Even Nos) North Fort Street And 7 (1F And 2F) Madeira Place With Garden Walls; Eh6 4Ex And Eh6 4An Respectively				55°58′31″N 3°11′02″W	Category C(S)	27243	Upload Photo
Morningside Road Christ Church Episcopal With Boundary Walls_Railings And Gatepiers				55°56′04″N 3°12′38″W	Category B	27262	Upload another image
161 And 163 Constitution Street And 22 Laurie Street				55°58′15″N 3°10′14″W	Category B	27272	Upload Photo
25 Falcon Gardens				55°55′49″N 3°12′16″W	Category C(S)	27273	Upload Photo
Sacred Heart, Convent Of The Main Building And Chapel 219 Colinton Road Craiglockhart				55°55′05″N 3°14′23″W	Category B	27274	Upload another image
24A Broughton Street (Former Albany Street Chapel), Including Railings And Gate				55°57′27″N 3°11′20″W	Category A	27157	Upload Photo
23 Pittville Street				55°57′07″N 3°06′25″W	Category C(S)	27160	Upload Photo
Glasgow Road, Gogar Park				55°56′14″N 3°19′46″W	Category C(S)	27169	Upload Photo
25 And 27 Pittville Street				55°57′07″N 3°06′24″W	Category B	27170	Upload Photo
South Clerk Street Queens Hall				55°56′28″N 3°10′54″W	Category A	27176	Upload another image
63 And 63A Colinton Road With Garden House, Boundary Walls And Gatepiers				55°55′54″N 3°12′57″W	Category B	27184	Upload Photo
22 And 22A Merchiston Park				55°56′16″N 3°12′53″W	Category C(S)	27207	Upload Photo
Jeffrey Street, Old St Paul's Church (Episcopal), Including Boundary Wall And Vestry Building				55°57′04″N 3°11′14″W	Category B	27212	Upload another image
101-109 (Odd Nos) Constitution Street				55°58′23″N 3°10′06″W	Category B	27218	Upload Photo
20 Seafield Road, Seafield Crematorium With Boundary Wall, Memorial Garden Wall And Gateway				55°58′11″N 3°08′51″W	Category B	27095	Upload Photo
18 And 20 Brighton Place				55°57′08″N 3°06′57″W	Category B	27097	Upload Photo
Glasgow Road, Castle Gogar Bridge				55°56′30″N 3°20′08″W	Category B	27102	Upload Photo
Casselbank Street And 17 Kirk Street, South Leith Baptist Church				55°58′13″N 3°10′26″W	Category C(S)	27108	Upload Photo
Mayfield Road And West Mayfield, Mayfield Salisbury Church, Including Church Hall, Gatepiers And Boundary Walls				55°55′59″N 3°10′37″W	Category B	27119	Upload Photo
4 And 5 Casselbank Street				55°58′13″N 3°10′25″W	Category C(S)	27126	Upload Photo
Glasgow Road, Gogar Mount House, N Lodge, Gates, Gatepiers, Walls And Railings				55°56′11″N 3°20′54″W	Category B	27135	Upload Photo
1 And 2 Lockharton Gardens With Railings And Gatepiers				55°55′35″N 3°13′56″W	Category A	27137	Upload Photo
29-31A (Odd Nos) And 35 Constitution Street And 9 Baltic Street, Former Corn Exchange				55°58′33″N 3°09′58″W	Category A	27140	Upload another image
13-17 (Odd Nos) Pittville Street (Pittville And Dundee)				55°57′06″N 3°06′25″W	Category B	27151	Upload Photo
32-44 (Even Nos) Ferry Road; Eh6 4Ae				55°58′31″N 3°10′51″W	Category C(S)	27020	Upload Photo
Dalmahoy House				55°54′14″N 3°22′10″W	Category A	27021	Upload Photo
75 And 77 Restalrig Road With Boundary Wall				55°58′04″N 3°09′28″W	Category C(S)	27024	Upload Photo
25 Bridge Street, Buchan Pottery Kilns				55°57′23″N 3°06′56″W	Category B	27036	Upload another image
26 Bonnington Road				55°58′20″N 3°10′34″W	Category C(S)	27037	Upload Photo
9 And 11 Joppa Road				55°56′57″N 3°06′05″W	Category C(S)	27042	Upload Photo
250 Bonnington Road, Cardboard Box Works				55°58′11″N 3°10′59″W	Category C(S)	27047	Upload Photo
4 Church Hill, Strathmore House				55°55′55″N 3°12′30″W	Category B	27048	Upload Photo
86-90 (Even Nos) Ferry Road With Front Walls And Railings; Eh6 4Ah				55°58′30″N 3°10′59″W	Category C(S)	27050	Upload Photo
490, Lanark Road West With Boundary Wall				55°53′20″N 3°20′14″W	Category C(S)	27066	Upload Photo
10 Church Hill, Beech Lodge, With Conservatory, Gig House And Boundary Walls				55°55′56″N 3°12′23″W	Category B	27069	Upload Photo
1-3 Seafield Place, 2, 4 Seafield Road With Railings				55°58′17″N 3°09′06″W	Category B	27075	Upload Photo
14, 14B, C, D, E, Church Hill				55°55′56″N 3°12′20″W	Category B	27079	Upload Photo
14 Ettrick Road				55°56′04″N 3°13′19″W	Category C(S)	27084	Upload Photo
205 Ferry Road, Bonnington Bank House With Front Walls And Gatepiers; Eh6 4Nn				55°58′25″N 3°11′24″W	Category C(S)	26939	Upload Photo
215 (Gf And 1F) And 217 Ferry Road With Front Walls; Eh6 4Nn				55°58′24″N 3°11′26″W	Category C(S)	26963	Upload Photo
Dalmahoy Estate, North Entrance				55°54′29″N 3°22′06″W	Category B	26964	Upload Photo
60 Johnsburn Road (Former S Lodge To Larch Grove) With Gatepiers And Boundary Wall				55°52′51″N 3°20′59″W	Category C(S)	26968	Upload Photo
42 Colinton Road With Boundary Walls And Gatepiers				55°55′46″N 3°13′36″W	Category B	26978	Upload Photo
18 Bellfield Street (Marantha)				55°57′09″N 3°06′29″W	Category C(S)	26981	Upload Photo
Royal Terrace Greenside Parish Church (Church Of Scotland), Including Retaining Walls, Railings And Steps And Church Officer's Cottage				55°57′25″N 3°10′56″W	Category A	27007	Upload Photo
28 And 30 Ferry Road, Leith Library (Incorporating Registrar's Office), Leith Theatre And Thomas Morton Hall, Porter's Lodge, Gates And Railings; Eh6 4Ae				55°58′32″N 3°10′48″W	Category B	27009	Upload another image
3 And 5 Church Hill				55°55′57″N 3°12′29″W	Category C(S)	27017	Upload Photo
84 Cammo Road, Lennie Mains				55°57′24″N 3°20′18″W	Category B	26865	Upload Photo
52 Gorgie Road, Mecca Tivoli (New Tivoli Picture House)				55°56′21″N 3°13′41″W	Category B	26877	Upload another image
7-9 (Odd Nos) Smith's Place				55°58′03″N 3°10′25″W	Category B	26885	Upload Photo
11 Smith's Place				55°58′03″N 3°10′24″W	Category B	26897	Upload Photo
8 Bruntsfield Terrace And Boundary Wall				55°56′11″N 3°12′22″W	Category B	26899	Upload Photo
24 Colinton Road Redfern With Conservatory Sundial Boundary_Walls And Gatepiers				55°55′53″N 3°13′09″W	Category C(S)	26905	Upload Photo
3 Clifton Road, Victoria Cottage, Newbridge (Former School) And Boundary Wall				55°55′18″N 3°25′14″W	Category B	26915	Upload Photo
14 Hermitage Place, Park View House Hotel With Boundary Wall				55°58′08″N 3°09′56″W	Category B	26918	Upload Photo
Craigiehall Temple (Off Cammo Road)				55°57′36″N 3°19′50″W	Category A	26928	Upload Photo
29-39 (Odd Nos) Bath Street				55°57′15″N 3°06′41″W	Category B	26806	Upload Photo
165 Leith Walk, Community Centre				55°58′04″N 3°10′26″W	Category C(S)	26807	Upload Photo
25 Bernard Street And 24 And 25 Maritime Street With Railings				55°58′32″N 3°10′04″W	Category A	26809	Upload Photo
14 Bath Street, The George, Formerly The County				55°57′14″N 3°06′48″W	Category C(S)	26818	Upload Photo
169-177 (Odd Nos) Leith Walk And 1 Smith's Place				55°58′03″N 3°10′26″W	Category B	26819	Upload Photo
Slateford Road Bridge At Shandon Place				55°56′05″N 3°13′57″W	Category C(S)	26820	Upload Photo
Slateford Road St Michael's Parish Church With Church Hall And Beadle's House Boundary Walls And Railings				55°56′12″N 3°13′38″W	Category A	26846	Upload another image See more images
Mansfield Place And East London Street, Former Catholic Apostolic Church (Latter Bellevue Reformed Baptist Church) With Railings				55°57′35″N 3°11′26″W	Category A	26849	Upload Photo
9 Lorne Street And Lorne Square, St Paul's Church And Hall, With Gatepiers				55°57′58″N 3°10′26″W	Category B	26859	Upload Photo
Dalry Road, Dalry Cemetery Lodge				55°56′26″N 3°13′27″W	Category B	26786	Upload Photo
Ashley House Stables And Kennels				55°55′39″N 3°21′34″W	Category B	26788	Upload Photo
Bavelaw Castle With Stables And Outbuildings, Gatepiers And Boundary Wall				55°51′04″N 3°19′53″W	Category A	26701	Upload Photo
1-17 (Odd Nos) Albion Road And 190-194 (Even Nos) Easter Road				55°57′43″N 3°10′14″W	Category C(S)	26703	Upload Photo
8 Abbotsford Crescent				55°55′54″N 3°12′46″W	Category C(S)	26706	Upload Photo
Bavelaw Road, Malleny Lodge With Boundary Wall				55°53′09″N 3°20′23″W	Category C(S)	26714	Upload Photo
41-43 (Odd Nos) Bavelaw Road, Balerno Bank Paper Mill Lodge With Boundary Wall				55°52′59″N 3°20′19″W	Category C(S)	26727	Upload Photo
30-38 (Even Nos) Dalmeny Street, Territorial Army Drill Hall				55°57′52″N 3°10′28″W	Category B	26729	Upload another image
28 Academy Street, Leith Victoria Boxing Club				55°58′15″N 3°10′10″W	Category C(S)	26731	Upload Photo
23 And 23A Argyle Crescent				55°56′55″N 3°06′17″W	Category B	26737	Upload Photo
1-5 Baltic Street, Former Gas Works				55°58′33″N 3°09′52″W	Category B	26744	Upload Photo
1, 2 And 3 Greyfriars Place				55°56′48″N 3°11′29″W	Category B	18972	Upload Photo
Dalmeny Village 1 And 2 Wester Dalmeny				55°58′57″N 3°22′27″W	Category C(S)	5530	Upload Photo
Dalmeny Village, 1-9 (Consecutive Nos) Wester Dalmeny Steading				55°58′56″N 3°22′32″W	Category C(S)	5547	Upload Photo
Dalmeny House, Leuchold Gate Lodge, Including Gatepiers				55°59′14″N 3°22′02″W	Category B	5506	Upload Photo
Dundas Castle, Fountain Sundial				55°58′31″N 3°24′49″W	Category A	5513	Upload Photo
Dundas Castle, Dovecot				55°58′33″N 3°25′12″W	Category B	5514	Upload Photo
Dundas Castle, Castleloch, Including Ice House				55°58′21″N 3°25′20″W	Category C(S)	5518	Upload Photo
6-18 (Inclusive Numbers) Dundas Home Farm (Formerly Newbigging Steading)				55°58′43″N 3°24′05″W	Category B	5520	Upload Photo
Westfield Farm House, Including Outbuilding And Boundary Walls				55°58′34″N 3°26′06″W	Category C(S)	5523	Upload Photo
5 Caroline Park And West Shore Road, Walled Garden To North Of Caroline Park House				55°58′56″N 3°14′29″W	Category C(S)	45784	Upload Photo
347A Pilton Avenue (And Crewe Road North), Telford College, Including Gymnasium And Entrance Gates				55°58′18″N 3°14′11″W	Category B	45799	Upload Photo
7 And 8 Swanston Village				55°53′33″N 3°12′57″W	Category C(S)	45845	Upload Photo
81-87 (Odd Nos) Broughton Street, Including Barony Bar				55°57′30″N 3°11′22″W	Category B	45931	Upload Photo
13-17 (Odd Nos) Forth Street				55°57′28″N 3°11′14″W	Category B	45947	Upload Photo
Leith Walk, Shrub Place, Shrubhill Tramway Workshops And Power Station				55°57′50″N 3°10′55″W	Category B	45956	Upload Photo
38 And 40 Barony Street				55°57′29″N 3°11′33″W	Category C(S)	46117	Upload Photo
20-26A (Even Nos) Randolph Lane				55°57′08″N 3°12′36″W	Category C(S)	46121	Upload Photo
137 Grange Loan, St Roque Lodge				55°55′52″N 3°11′50″W	Category C(S)	46191	Upload Photo
143 Grange Loan, Astley Ainslie Hospital, Scientific Block				55°55′42″N 3°11′56″W	Category C(S)	46192	Upload Photo
143 Grange Loan, Astley Ainslie Hospital, Boundary Wall To Grange Loan, Canaan Lane, South Oswald Road And Cluny Place, Including Gateways				55°55′52″N 3°11′55″W	Category C(S)	46193	Upload Photo
138-140 (Even Nos) Glasgow Road				55°56′28″N 3°18′32″W	Category C(S)	46332	Upload Photo
30 And 32 Primrose Bank Road, Craigforth, With Gatepiers, Boundary Walls And Railings				55°58′46″N 3°12′34″W	Category C(S)	46743	Upload Photo
23 Russell Place, North Gothic Cottage, With Boundary Wall				55°58′43″N 3°12′19″W	Category C(S)	46746	Upload Photo
90 And 92 Trinity Road, Silverton, With Boundary Walls And Gatepiers				55°58′38″N 3°12′22″W	Category B	46751	Upload Photo
Warriston Gardens, George Heriot's Recreation Ground, Cricket Pavilion				55°58′16″N 3°12′10″W	Category C(S)	46757	Upload Photo
85-87 (Odd Nos) Shandwick Place				55°56′56″N 3°12′36″W	Category C(S)	47731	Upload Photo
46-66 (Even Nos) Home Street, 1 And 3 Lochrin Place And 2 And 4 Lochrin Buildings				55°56′33″N 3°12′14″W	Category C(S)	47784	Upload Photo
Newhalls Road, Hawes Pier				55°59′30″N 3°23′10″W	Category C(S)	47793	Upload another image See more images
6 Villa Road, Provost Lamp				55°59′26″N 3°24′00″W	Category B	47794	Upload Photo
44 Candlemaker Row				55°56′49″N 3°11′30″W	Category C(S)	47848	Upload Photo
29 Castle Terrace, Including Boundary Wall And Railings				55°56′50″N 3°12′09″W	Category A	47854	Upload Photo
83-85 Grassmarket				55°56′52″N 3°11′40″W	Category B	47872	Upload Photo
18-24 (Even Nos) Grassmarket, Beehive Inn				55°56′51″N 3°11′50″W	Category B	47873	Upload another image
94 Grassmarket				55°56′53″N 3°11′42″W	Category B	47878	Upload Photo
1-5 (Odd Nos) Grindlay Street And 21 Spittal Street				55°56′48″N 3°12′11″W	Category C(S)	47879	Upload Photo
10 - 14 (Even Nos) Lauriston Place, Including Boundary Wall, Gate And Railings				55°56′42″N 3°11′44″W	Category B	47887	Upload Photo
7 Victoria Terrace, Quaker Meeting House				55°56′56″N 3°11′38″W	Category B	47903	Upload another image
Edinburgh Castle, Foog's Gate				55°56′54″N 3°12′01″W	Category A	48217	Upload another image
Edinburgh Castle, Governor's House				55°56′55″N 3°12′04″W	Category A	48219	Upload another image
Edinburgh Castle, United Services Museum				55°56′54″N 3°12′01″W	Category A	48231	Upload another image
Lawnmarket, North Side, Telephone Kiosks				55°56′58″N 3°11′35″W	Category B	48244	Upload another image

== Key ==
The scheme for classifying buildings in Scotland is:

- Category A: "buildings of national or international importance, either architectural or historic; or fine, little-altered examples of some particular period, style or building type."
- Category B: "buildings of regional or more than local importance; or major examples of some particular period, style or building type, which may have been altered."
- Category C: "buildings of local importance; lesser examples of any period, style, or building type, as originally constructed or moderately altered; and simple traditional buildings which group well with other listed buildings."

In March 2016 there were 47,288 listed buildings in Scotland. Of these, 8% were Category A, and 50% were Category B, with the remaining 42% being Category C.

== See also ==
- List of listed buildings in Edinburgh
