= Robert Gilchrist (cricketer) =

Scottish cricketer

Personal information
- Full name: Robert Selby Nesbit Gilchrist
- Born: c. 1821; Leith, Midlothian, Scotland
- Died: 9 February 1905 (aged 83/84); Berwick-upon-Tweed, Northumberland, England
- Batting: Unknown
- Bowling: Unknown

Career statistics
| Competition | First-class |
|---|---|
| Matches | 1 |
| Runs scored | 2 |
| Batting average | 1.00 |
| 100s/50s | –/– |
| Top score | 2 |
| Balls bowled | 16 |
| Wickets | 0 |
| Bowling average | – |
| 5 wickets in innings | – |
| 10 wickets in match | – |
| Best bowling | – |
| Catches/stumpings | –/– |
- Source: Cricinfo, 28 March 2019

Robert Selby Nesbit Gilchrist (c. 1821 – 9 February 1905) was a Scottish first-class cricketer.

Gilchrist was born at Leith in Midlothian during 1821. He later made a single appearance in first-class cricket for the Gentlemen of Middlesex against the Gentlemen of England at Islington in 1865. Batting twice in the match, he was run out in the Gentlemen of Middlesex's first-innings without scoring, while in their second-innings he was again run out, having scored 2 runs. He died at Berwick-upon-Tweed in February 1905.
