= Henderson Street =

Street in Leith, Edinburgh, Scotland

Coordinates: 55.973126°N 3.173161°W

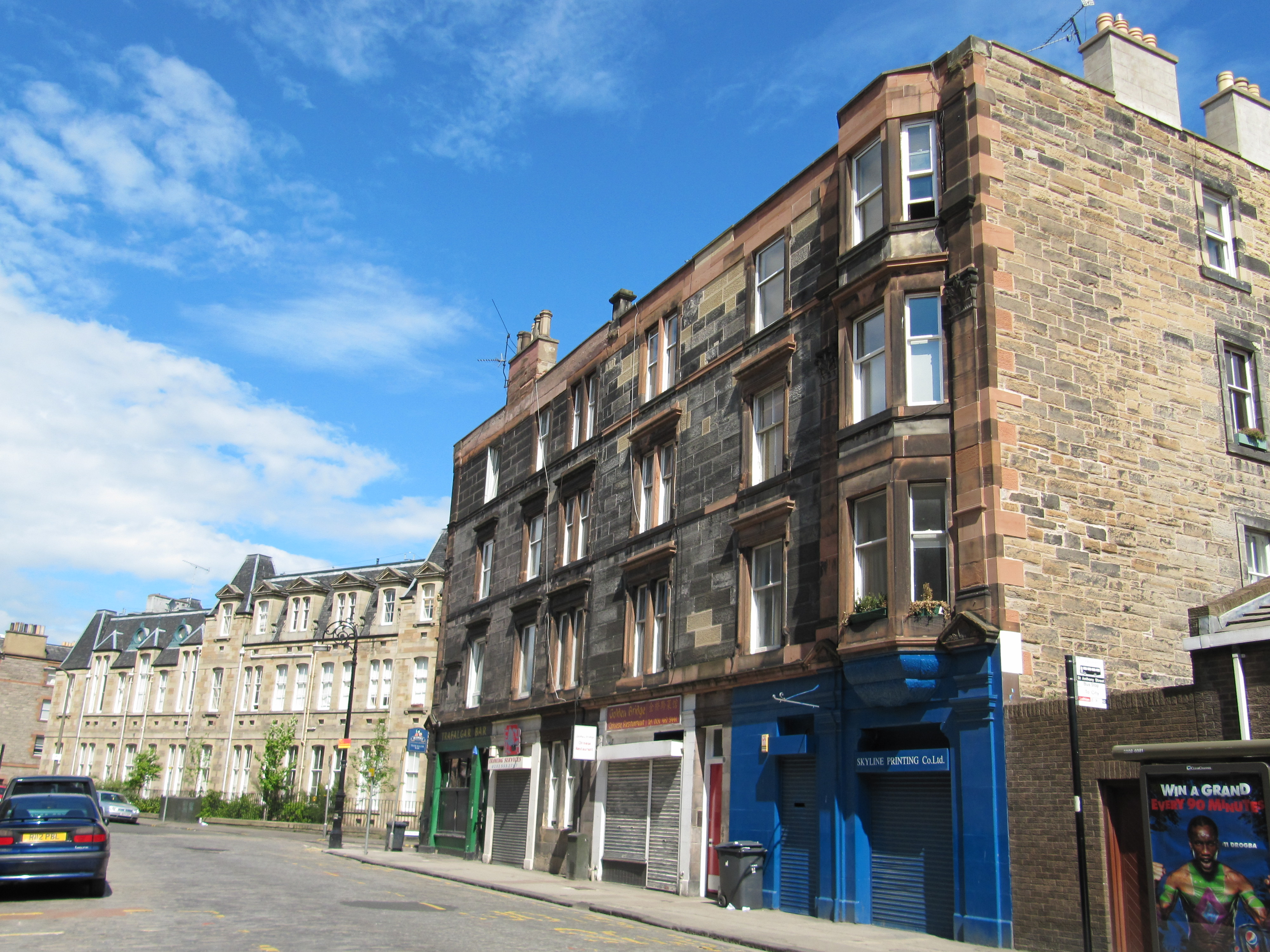
- Henderson Street, Leith, Edinburgh, Scotland
- Interactive map of Henderson Street
- Maintained by: City of Edinburgh Council
- Length: 0.4 km (0.25 mi)
- Location: Leith, Edinburgh, Scotland
- Postal code: EH6
- North East end: Shore, Leith, Edinburgh
- South end: Great Junction Street, Leith, Edinburgh

Construction
- Commissioned: 1880
- Construction start: 1886-1887
- Completion: 1890s

Henderson Street is a street in Leith, a district of the city of Edinburgh, Scotland. It forms a curving artery between Great Junction Street and an area known as the Shore, where the Water of Leith runs into the Port of Leith/Leith Docks. Henderson Street lies within the boundaries of the Leith Conservation Area and includes several listed buildings.

The street is named after Dr John Henderson, M.D. (1819–1901), a Fellow of the Royal College of Surgeons of Edinburgh and twice Provost of Leith: from 1875–81 and again in 1887. Dr. Henderson worked to secure the implementation of the Leith Improvement Scheme (see below) which ultimately led to the street being built.

== Background ==
In 1877 the Provost of Leith, Dr John Henderson, proposed to the Town Council that measures should be taken to address the high mortality rate, and especially the infant mortality rate, in the area of Leith between Giles Street and Coalhill. They conceived a plan to sweep away the dense medieval buildings initially seeking to use powers under the Police Act. This proved inadequate and they then sought to use the Artisans Dwelling House Act, which was not really designed for this purpose. The ultimate plan sought to link Great Junction Street to the Shore, greatly improving access to the harbour. The final scheme removed 18 ancient closes and many hundreds of buildings ranging in date from the 15th to 18th century. Ironically, although one of the issues levelled at the pre-existing area was that of "over-density" the 3,600 people displaced was replaced by a population of 7,000. As was standard in all such schemes, both then and now, the logistics of rehousing meant that the 3,600 removed were largely not in the group of the 7,000 rehoused. This inevitable stirring of the population introduced a huge ratio of persons who were not indigenous to Leith, an exercise repeated in Leith in the 1960s. The cost of the project was estimated at £100,000 in 1881 but the Home Secretary (who controlled public spending) limited this to £70,000 which meant a more puritanical approach to much of the construction.

== Construction and history ==
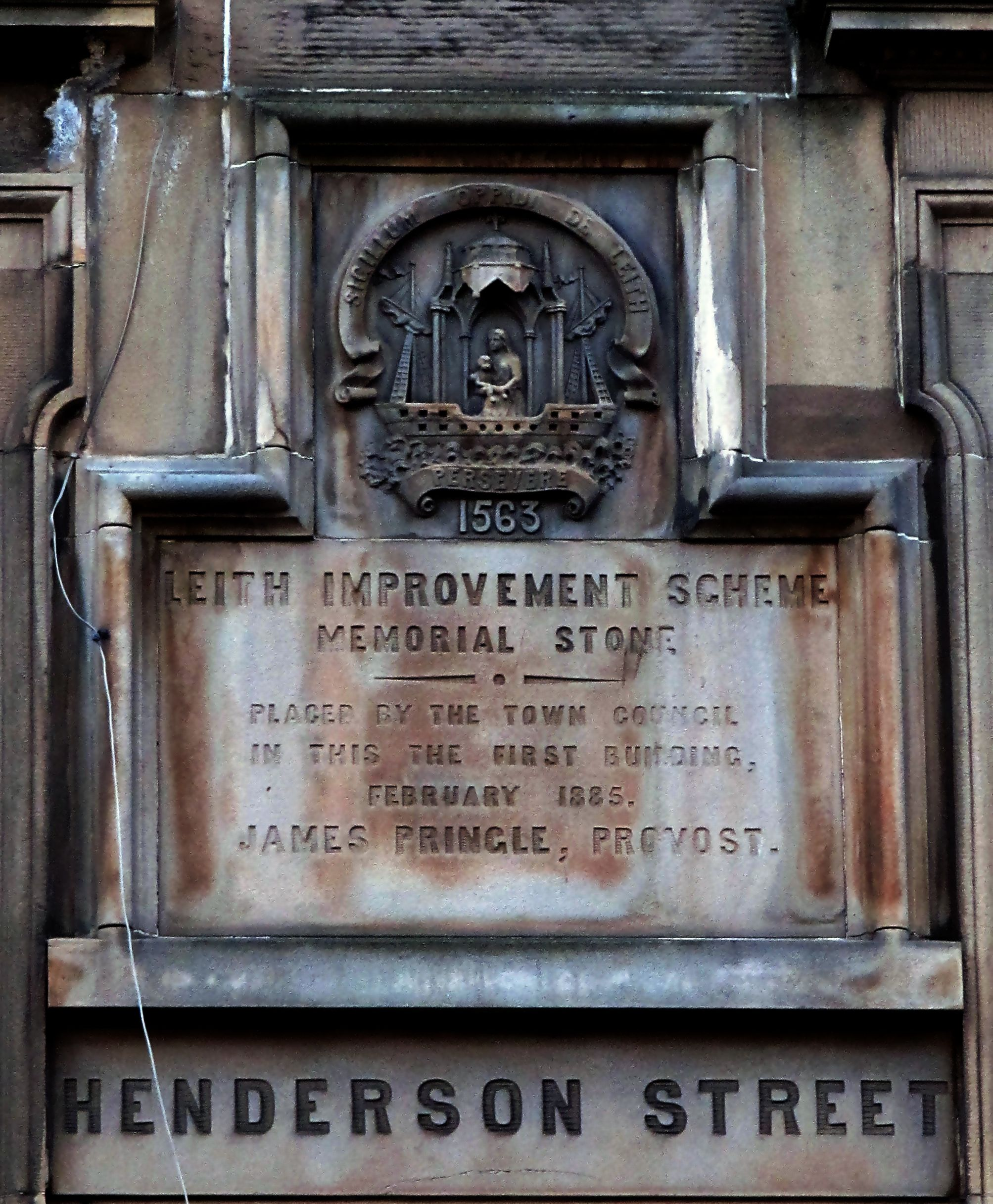
Henderson Street Memorial Stone

Henderson Street was built as part of the Leith Improvement Scheme, introduced in an act of Parliament known as the Leith Improvement Scheme Confirmation Act 1880 (43 & 44 Vict. c. clxxv). The construction of the street required that 18 pre-existing closes be demolished in order to make way for the new buildings and layout. At that time, housing conditions in this part of Leith were very poor. Housing was overcrowded, poverty and ill health were rife and infant mortality was particularly high. Consequently, it was hoped that the creation of Henderson Street would improve living conditions for the local residents.

The street was set out to be 50 ft wide and made up predominantly of residential houses (these to be in the Scottish vernacular, Victorian tenement style) and frequently including commercial/retail spaces at ground level. The foundation stone of the first property (right) was laid by Provost James Pringle.

Henderson Street took many years to complete, with records (available from Edinburgh City Archives) showing petitions to build new dwelling houses spanning many years - from the latter 1880s through into the 1890s.

== Development ==
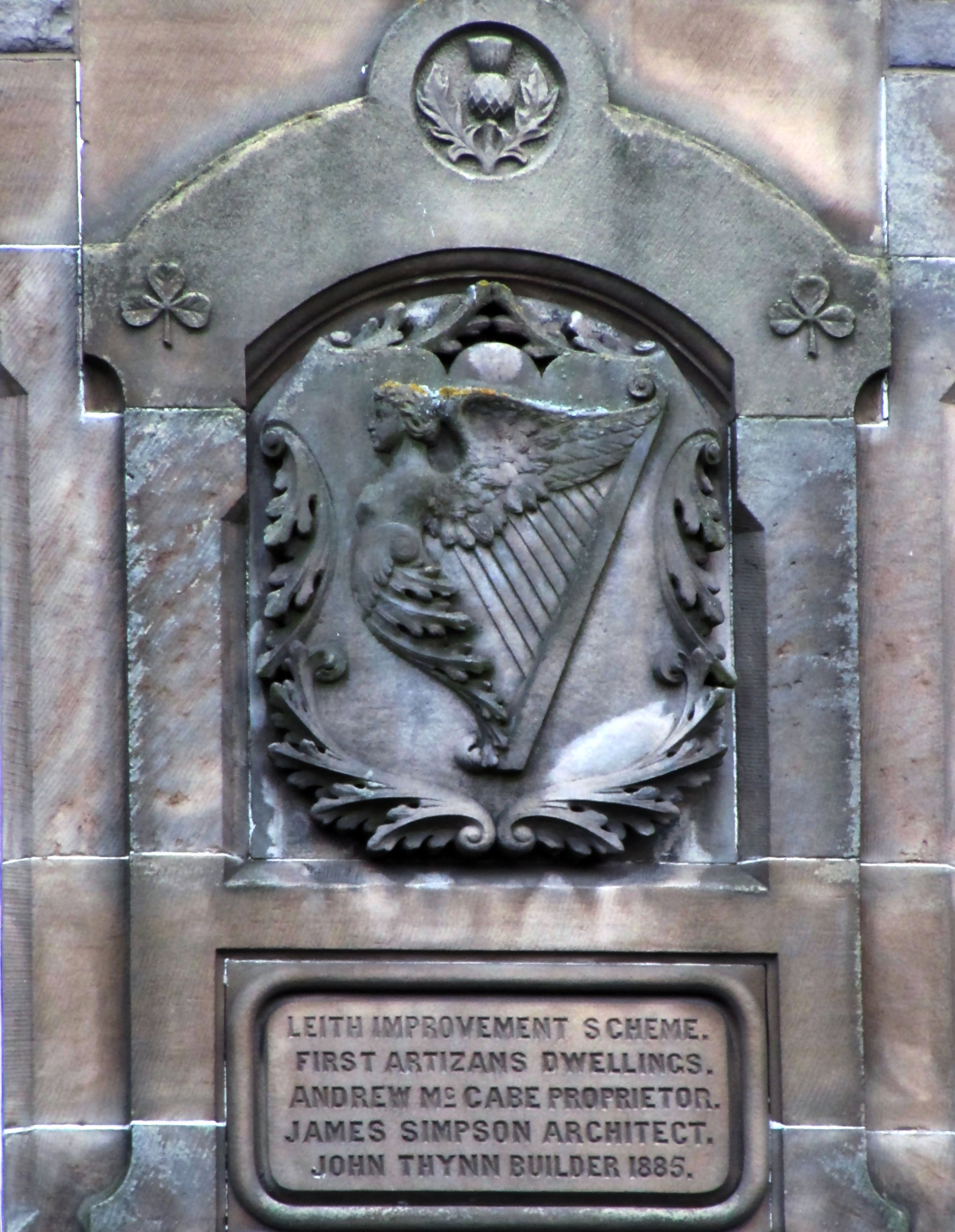
Henderson st artisan plaque

Henderson Street first appeared in the Edinburgh and Leith Post Office Directories in the year 1886/87. Only entries for numbers 1 and 2 are displayed and list residents, suggesting that the rest of the street was still under construction. Over the following ten years, more and more entries and house numbers appear. Though a listing in the P.O. directories was not automatic (and did require payment of a charge), the listings available give some indication of the kind of early residents and businesses on the street. These include, from the period 1887–1901: joiners, contractors, carters, midwives, ladies' nurses, invalid attendants, seamen, master mariners, apprentice engineers, wire-weavers, spirit merchants, fruiterers, master bakers, elementary teachers and scholars.

Businesses on the street included drapers, hosiers and glovers, dairies, an Inland Revenue office and, from 1891–1900, a William Hope and S Hope ran the Leith Herald Office publishing the Leith Herald newspaper from 12 Henderson Street. No. 12 is still home to a printers (Skyline Printers) as of 2012.

The street did, therefore, provide dwellings for artisans and labourers. Accommodation would have been rented out to these occupants. The Census of 1891 and 1901 show that many of the flats housed, by contemporary standards, large families (sometimes six to eight people, occasionally with the addition of a live-in lodger or maid). These large families lived in what, by modern standards, would be considered a comfortably sized two bedroom flat.

Today, the tenement flats of Henderson Street are in private ownership; owner-occupied or privately rented out. The street might loosely be described as a mixture of old Leith families with long ties to the area; blow-ins (who moved in during the property boom of the late 1990s and early Noughties) and transient local and migrant workers who rent in the area.

== Victorian architecture ==
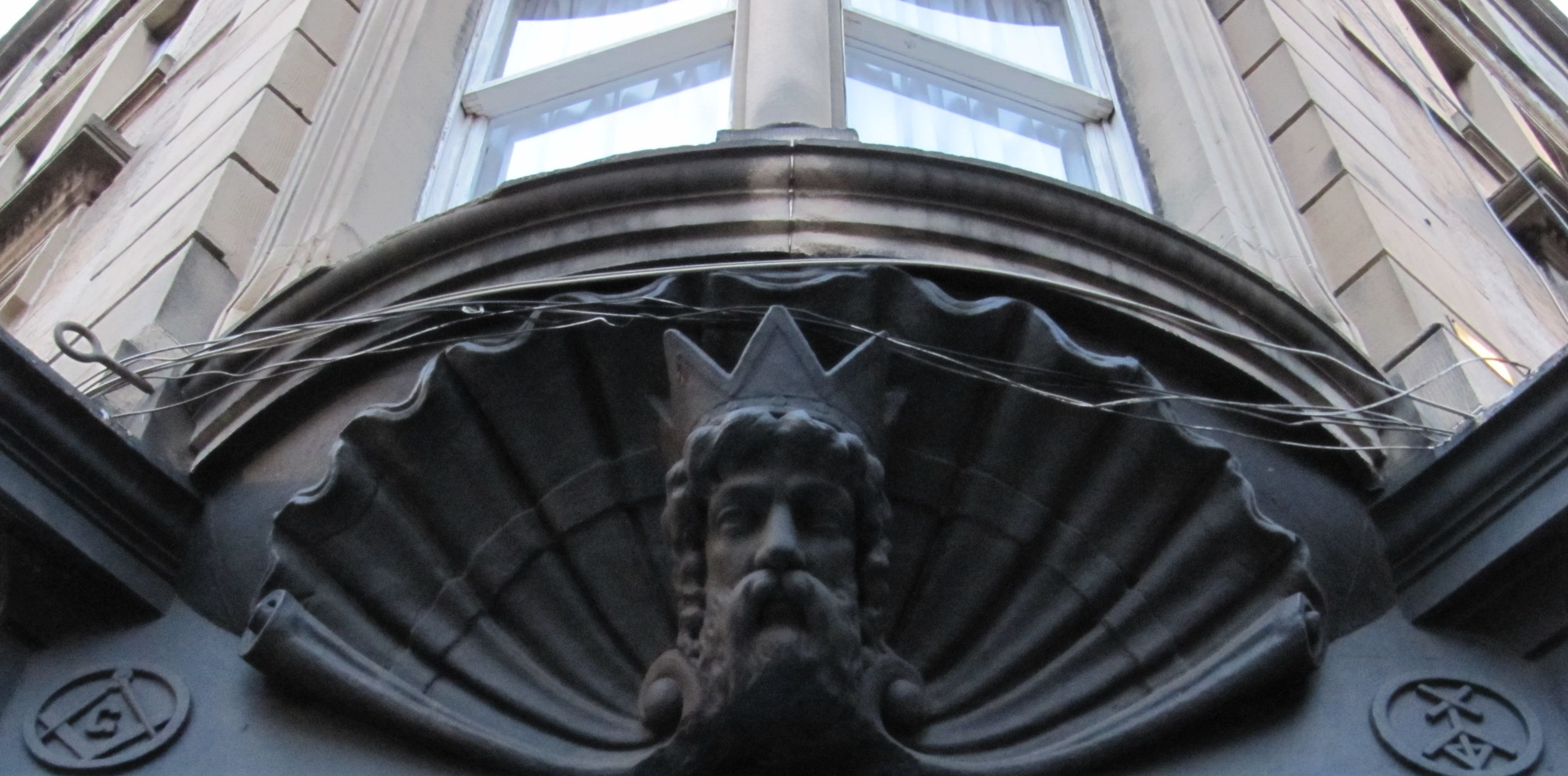
Head of Neptune, Henderson Street, Leith

Henderson Street is home to some fine examples of Victorian urban architecture and there are several listed buildings on the street and in the immediate vicinity. Turning onto Henderson Street from Great Junction Street, Number 2, Henderson Street has been B Listed since 1995. Above the corner entrance is a detailed carving of the head of the Sea God, Neptune – perhaps chosen to reflect the close proximity and importance of the sea to the Port of Leith. This building also has a carved stone plaque commemorating it as the first project of the Leith Improvement Scheme. It was built in 1885 and possibly designed by the architect Archibald Thomson.

=== James Simpson ===
Scottish architect, James Simpson,(1832–94) held the positions of Town Architect of Leith and, for a period, was architect to the Leith School Board around the time when Henderson Street was under development. He worked on many notable buildings in Leith including Leith Town Hall on Queen Charlotte Street (now Leith Police Station) and also Leith Hospital at King Street and Mill Lane (now converted for residential use).

Henderson Street Simpson Building Detail

Simpson was responsible for the design of the building on Henderson Street now known as 'Academia' — recently converted to residential use — formerly St Mary's workshops, and originally designed by him as Yardheads School. Although the front entrance is on nearby Giles Street, the rear of the building faces onto (and forms) a significant section of the Henderson Street layout. This school was purpose built in 1875 at a cost of £3,807. Around that time, it had four hundred children on the roll and nine teachers, with one classroom being able to accommodate 126 children. The building has been C listed since 1995. At the Shore end of Henderson Street, (odd numbers 73—91A) there is a noteworthy example of a sandstone residential and commercial building with intricate, detailed carvings and masonry work. This was also designed by James Simpson, was built in 1891, and has been C Listed since 1977. Simpson's signature and the date are still clearly visible on the stonework.

Just off Henderson Street, on Parliament Street, is another example of Simpson's work: a Model Lodging House, which was built in 1893 with the aim of providing cheap, clean, overnight accommodation to transient workers in the area. It is still used to provide temporary accommodation by Canmore Housing Association (ii). A plaque above the door of this substantial building commemorates its purpose and those involved in its erection. The Model Lodging House has been C Listed since 1995. Numbers 59—61 Henderson Street are also attributed to Simpson.

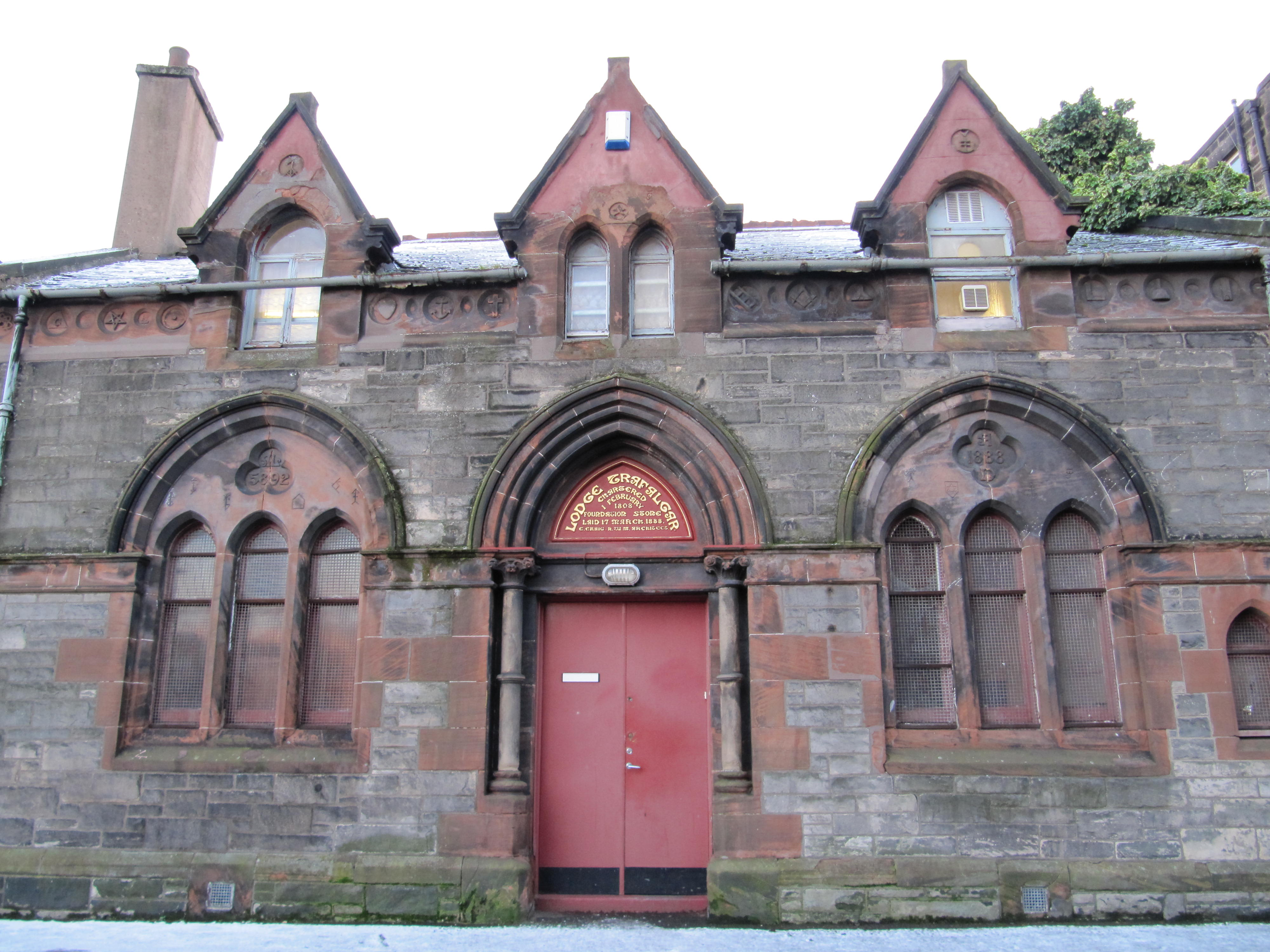
Trafalgar Lodge, Saint Anthony Place, Leith

=== George Craig ===
Simpson's successor, as architect to the Leith School Board, was his former apprentice George Craig (1852–1928). In 1888, Craig, a Freemason, designed the Trafalgar Masonic Hall on St Anthony Lane, just off Henderson Street. According to a report in The Scotsman, a time capsule was buried in the building during the ceremony that took place for the laying of the Foundation Stone. This sandstone building, which is still in use as a Masonic Lodge, has been C Listed since 1995 and has many masonic symbols and decorative motifs carved into the stonework on the front elevation. The basement still contains fragments from St. Anthony's Priory (which gives its name to the side street).

=== Masonic symbols on Henderson St ===
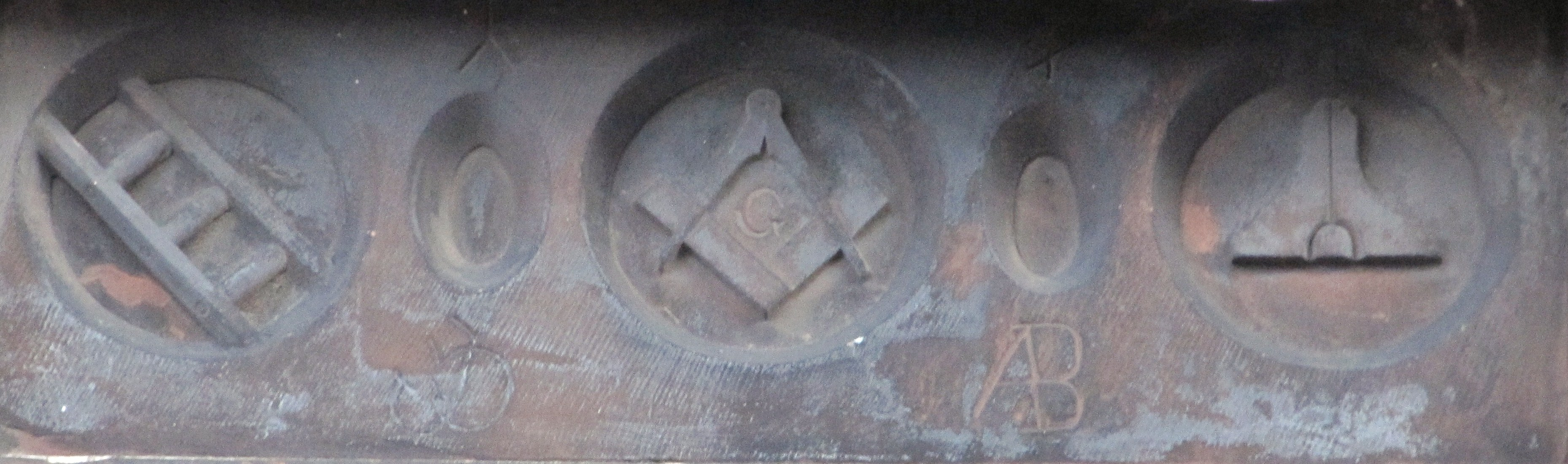
Henderson Street Trafalgar Lodge Masonic Symbols

Masonic symbols are also visible on Numbers 2 and 4 Henderson Street near the decorative carving of the Head of Neptune; additional symbols on this building are currently covered over by shop hoardings. There are also masonic symbols visible on the stonework of Number 14 (on the front fascia at third-floor level). The quantity of masonic motifs appears to reflect the elevated status of both stonemasonry, as a craft, and freemasonry, as a guild, within the area in the late nineteenth century.

=== Lost Victorian buildings ===
In 1885, architects James M. Thomson and Robert Thornton Shiells won a competition to produce a design for the Kirkgate United Presbyterian Church (also known as St Anthony's Church). The church was located at the Great Junction Street end of Henderson Street (on the corner of Henderson and St Anthony Street). It opened in 1886 on the site where South Leith Parish Church now has its church halls (iii). This large, ornate, Italianate structure was to last less than a hundred years. It was demolished in 1975; despite some protest and an attempt to get it listed in order to prevent its destruction. The current church hall building was opened on 2 July 1982 by Prince Philip, Duke of Edinburgh. A small stone relief from the earlier church can still be seen inset into the fascia of the current church halls, near the entrance. This relief and a time capsule (discovered in the foundations of the church during its demolition and then reburied under the new structure) are all that remain of the Kirkgate United Presbyterian Church on Henderson Street.

== Earlier architecture in the area ==
=== Scottish Parliament ===
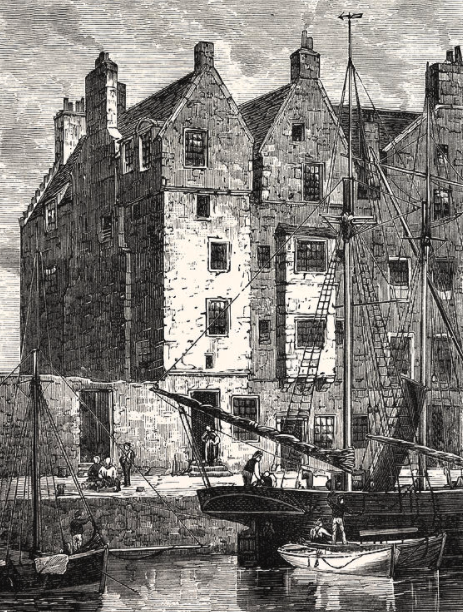
Parliament (Council Chamber) at Coalhill in Leith

The most tragic loss of the improvement scheme (which is not wholly explained) is the Scottish Parliament/ Council Office which is now only remembered in the name "Parliament Street". This stood on Coalhill and was a highly ornamental (carved stone) building with a "fabulous interior". This was erected at the instruction of Mary of Guise who lived nearby on Queen Street (now called Shore Place) for the use of her Privy Council around 1545. It was still described as "regal" in the mid 19th century but either fell from grace or was forgotten in the replanning exercise. This was possibly due to its juxtaposition to Peat Nook, a large doss house for unemployed seamen and the lower parts of society.

=== Yardheads distillery ===
Just off Henderson Street is the street known as Yardheads, on which is a large group of warehouses formerly known as Crabbies Warehouse. These warehouses formed a distillery which produced a well known Scottish drink, Crabbies Green Ginger Wine. Crabbies Wine was first created and distilled in Leith in 1801. John Crabbie & Co. moved to the Yardheads premises in the 1850s where they would continue to produce their Green Ginger Wine for more than a Century. Crabbies Ginger Wine (and ginger beer) are still made in Scotland today, though the distilling and bottling process ceased at Yardheads in the 1990s and manufacturing has now been relocated from Leith.

The warehouses at Yardheads had various extensions and additions over time. Parts of the existing buildings date to 1825 and had formed part of an earlier Yardheads Brewery which made porter. All of the historic sections of the Crabbies Warehouse complex have been B listed since 1990. The buildings were converted into flats in 2000.

=== St. Anthony Street, St. Anthony Place and St. Anthony Lane ===
Today, the short streets known as St Anthony Place, St Anthony Street and St Anthony Lane serve as an entrance / exit route from Henderson Street to the modern Kirkgate Shopping Centre car park. The names date back many hundreds of years and reveal much about the ancient landscape of the area. Long before the construction of Henderson Street (and before the existence of the eighteen closes that were demolished to make way for it) on the site of these streets and in the surrounding area was a monastery dedicated to St Anthony. It was known as St Anthony's Preceptory or Monastery. There is disagreement about the date of foundation of the monastery and also over by whom it was founded. Some sources use 1430 as a guide date for its inception and other sources claim it came into existence, in the form of a hospital for the poor, much earlier — possibly as early as 1327.

There does seem to be general agreement from most sources that this monastery was on a large site; with monastic dwelling houses located roughly around the site of what is now the Kirkgate carpark, the Trafalgar Masonic Lodge, South Leith Parish Church Halls and some of the Henderson Street tenements. A burial ground was located to the south of these structures extending towards Great Junction Street. This has been substantiated by the discovery of a burial site in this location during the laying of gas pipes in St Anthony Street. The site of the monastery reputedly extended down to Henderson Gardens and all along the street still known as Yardheads. It is thought that the street name 'Yardheads' may derive from the old Germanic stem, in which the word Yard means a garden or orchard. This would suggest the monastery had large gardens and orchards extending to this point. It is said that the monastery suffered great damage during the Siege of Leith in 1560. After the Scottish Reformation the monastery was allowed to languish; other buildings being gradually erected in its place and removing all physical traces of its existence. The Seal of the Preceptory of St Anthony (used to authenticate official paperwork of the hospital / monastery and dating from the mid-1500s) is held at the National Museum of Scotland.

=== The Vaults and The Porters Stone ===
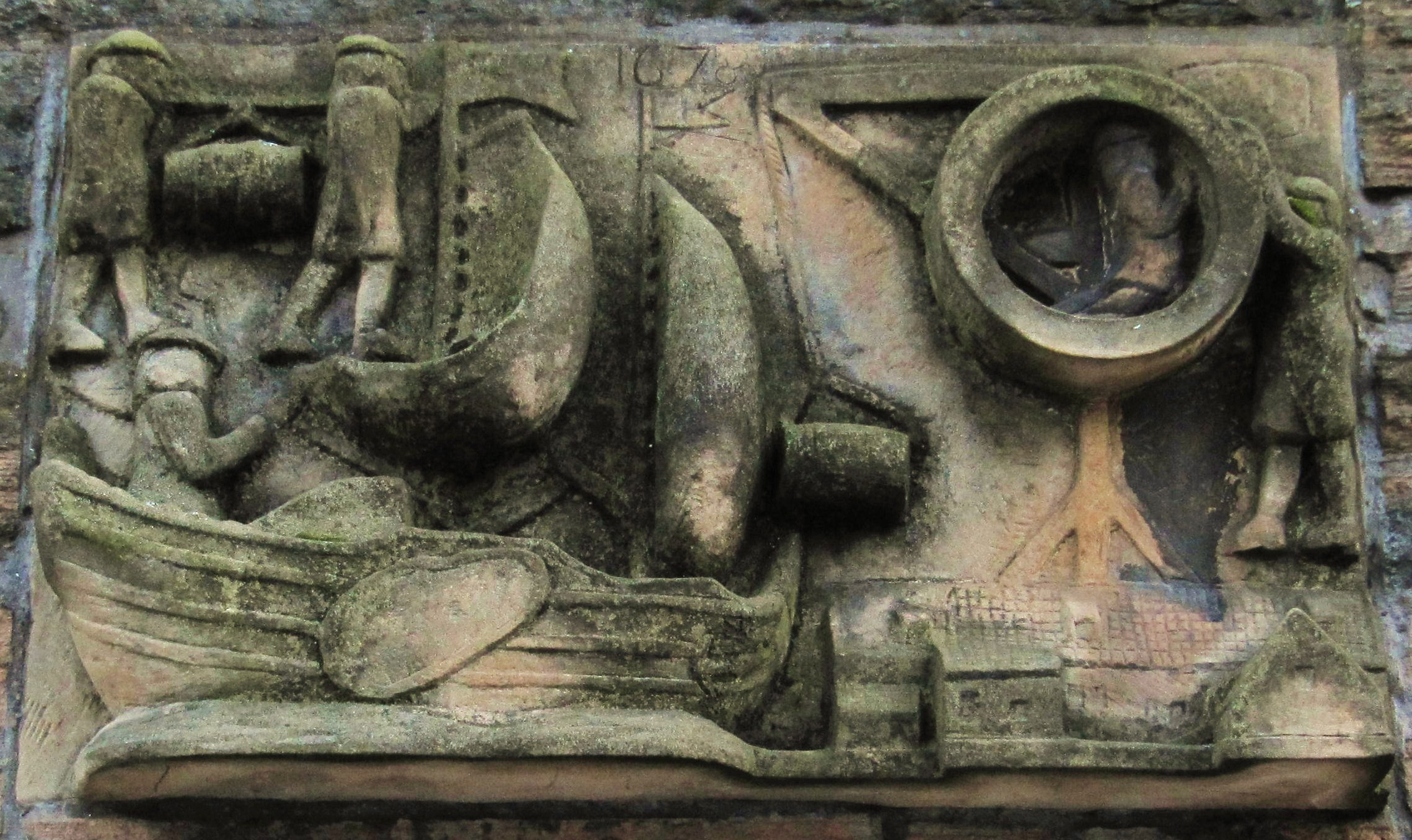
Henderson Street Porters Stone

Turning the corner on Henderson Street, passing Henderson Gardens and heading down towards the Shore, on the right hand side is the high stone boundary wall of the Vaults. The (A listed) Vaults have existed for centuries, though the building has had many transformations. The buildings have consistently been connected to the wine (Bordeaux / Claret) and spirit trade — important businesses for many centuries in the port of Leith. Today, the Vaults are home to the Scotch Malt Whisky Society (iv) with empty space for a restaurant / bar, below it.

The construction of Henderson Street, in the late nineteenth century, caused the pre-existing yards of the Vaults to be reduced in size, as it was necessary for the new street to cut through their existing land; the current boundary wall dates from the late 19th century, and maps of the area before and after Henderson Street was built also make this clear.

On Henderson Street, about halfway along the length of this wall, a stone tablet known as the Porters Stone is inlaid into the stone work. As stated on the plaque beneath it, this is a copy of the original Porters Stone. The original carving dates from 1678 and gives a pictorial representation of how wine was unloaded and transported through Leith at that time — showing the Porters of Leith at work. The Porters Stone was originally located at Tolbooth Wynd, which lies at the Shore end of Henderson Street. All traces of the old Tolbooth Wynd have since been demolished and replaced by modern flats (though the name remains). The old Tolbooth Wynd led to Leith's Kirkgate and formed a major thoroughfare to and from the Shore until Henderson Street was built. The Porters were a trade guild — one of the many important and sometimes very powerful trade guilds of Leith's past.

The replica stone, visible on Henderson Street today, was carved by Cumbrian sculptor (and former Merchant Navy Seaman) Shawn Williamson in 1990 at the instigation of the then local councillor Cllr Rev Mrs Elizabeth Wardlaw and overseen by local historian and planner Stephen Dickson. The original was considered too fragile to be reinstated and remained in storage in the Museum of Edinburgh.

== Green space ==
=== Henderson Gardens Park ===
Henderson Street has a small green space known as Henderson Gardens Park, now operated by City Of Edinburgh Council Parks Department. It was created in the 1950s through demolition of tenements, and was to be part of the landscape setting for Cables Wynd House. The garden was refurbished in 1983 as part of the Leith Project and has a plaque at the Yardheads entrance commemorating this. It contains a small children's play area, the rest being mainly laid to grass with some seating, and is bordered by shrubs and trees.

== Street furniture ==
=== Police box ===
Henderson Street is also home to one of Edinburgh's famous police boxes designed in the 1930s by, the then City Architect, E.J. MacRae.

=== Street lighting ===
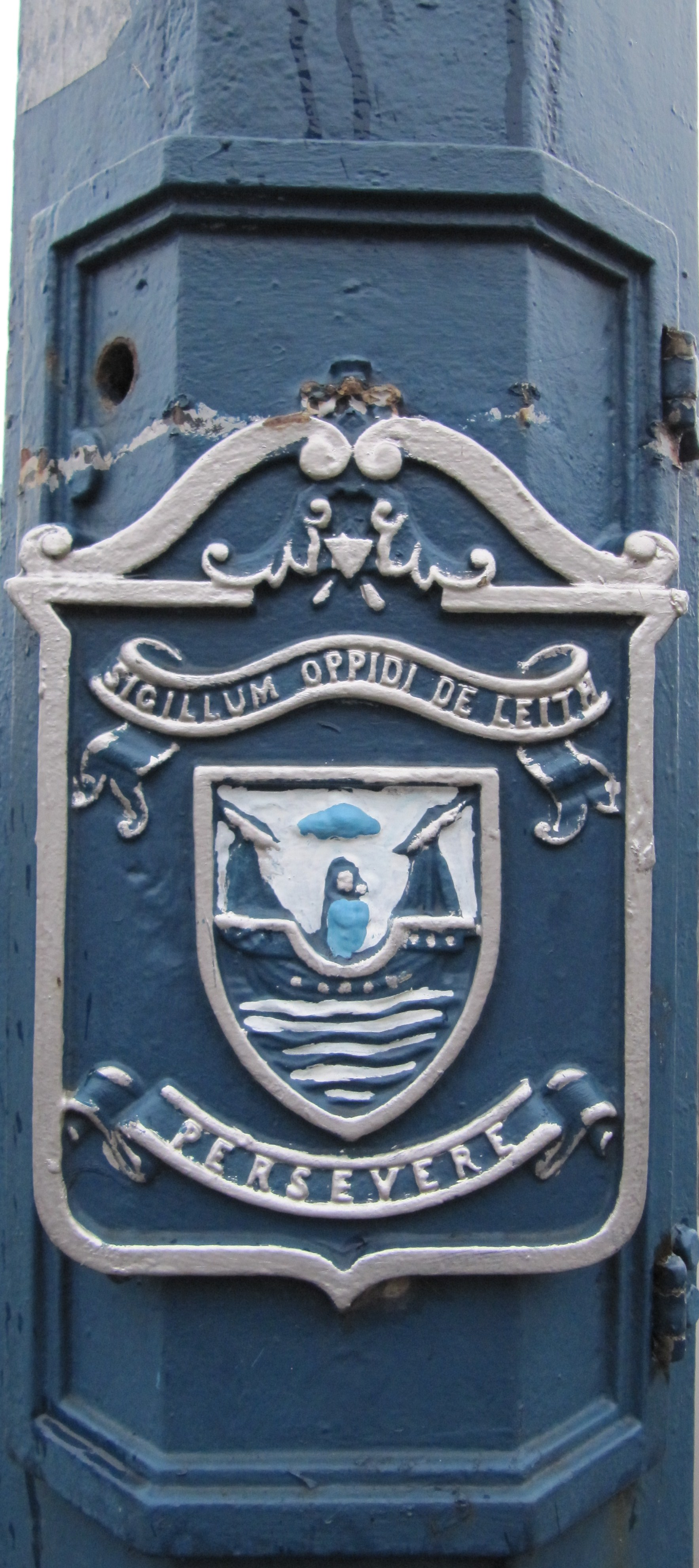
Lamp Base.

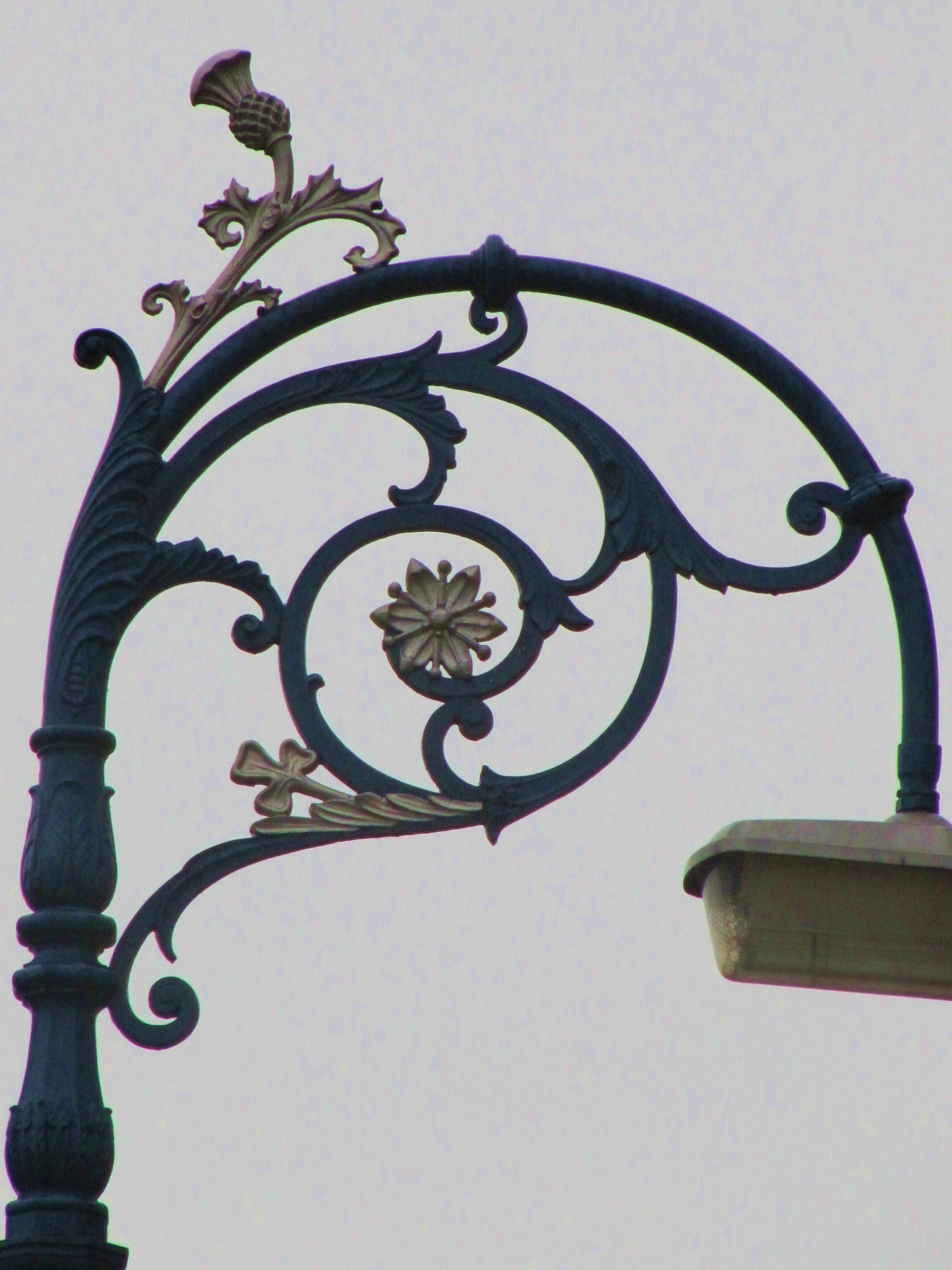
Lamp Head.

Detail views of Leith Lamp-posts.

A number of original Victorian Cast Iron Street lamps are still in use on Henderson Street today. Though it is evident, from old photographs of the area, that these lamps were once part of a larger urban lighting scheme and were extremely prevalent throughout Leith, there are remarkably few left standing today. These street lights are unique to this area – apparent from the 'Persevere' Insignia which adorns the base section of each lamp. Also on the base section of the lamps is the image of a woman and child at sea in a ship with the Latin Inscription 'Sigillum Oppidi De Leith', which translates as 'Seal of the Town of Leith'. (The insignia is also visible on several Victorian civic buildings in Leith). Decorative motifs on the lamp heads include: a thistle, a shamrock and a tudor rose which are national floral emblems and used in the Royal Coat of Arms of the United Kingdom. These cast iron lamps were made by Mc Dowall, Steven & Co., London and Glasgow, who were based at the Milton Works in Glasgow circa 1862—1909. There are several more of the same street lamps further along from Henderson Street, on the Shore, which – painted to show off their design work – provide the most easily visible examples of the detail work on these lamps.

== In popular culture ==
=== Television ===
Several location scenes for Channel 4's 2007 TV drama Wedding Belles were filmed on Henderson Street. The screenplay for Wedding Belles was scripted by Leith-born writer, Irvine Welsh.

=== Film ===
Henderson Street once had its own cinema, at no.91 behind the building where Insider Tattoo (i) is today. It was listed in the Edinburgh and Leith Post Office Directories as the 'Empire Picture House' and was definitely active in the late 1920s and early 1930s, though by the 1950s, it had been closed down and boarded up.

== Businesses ==
These days, although many ground floor commercial premises have been converted into domestic dwellings, Henderson Street continues, to some extent, to maintain its mixture of residential and commercial properties. As of 2012 it is home to a wide range of restaurants and cafés. At Number 21—23 was Mitchells Café and Take Away, which claimed to be the oldest café in Leith; while this claim is unverified, the premises had certainly been operating in café format since at least 1924, when it opened its doors as an Italian ice cream parlour. Many long-time Leithers still refer to Mitchells as Lannys; so ingrained is the old ice cream cafe in their memories. The cafe closed, along with the adjacent Andersons Bar in 2020 for conversion to residential.

=== The Italian influence and the World War II years ===
A'99 at 'Lucia Lannie's on Henderson Street was a treat,

And 'Joe De Ponio's fish and chips were simply exquisite.

But we turned our back on all our friends during the Mussolini years,

We broke their windows, wrecked their shops, threw jibes and dirty jeers.

And many met an untimely death when the ‘Arandora’ sank

All nationalized Old Leither’s on whose friendship we could bank.

We know this is belated, but at least it is a start,

“We ask you for forgiveness, from the bottom of our heart”.

Angelo Lanny formed part of a large-scale migration of Italians to Scotland in the late 19th and early 20th century. So many made their home and established businesses in Leith, that it came to be seen as Edinburgh's answer to Little Italy. (The Leith-born artist Eduardo Paolozzi provides the most internationally well known example of the Italian migratory influence on Leith). Angelo Lanny was not alone in establishing a business on Henderson Street; at around the same period the street was also home to a fish and chip shop called 'Joe De Ponio's', an Italian Barbers called 'Galletta's', and a large-scale fish and chip shop/café called Scappiticci's. (Scappiticci's was located around numbers 85—91 Henderson Street, where the Raj Indian restaurant (i) is now).

The Italians of Henderson Street (and Leith in general) were also not immune to the results of Benito Mussolini siding with Adolf Hitler in World War II. Like many other Italian businesses, Angelo Lanny's shop was attacked and looted as a result of a new wave of anti-Italian feeling amongst some of the local population, and as was typical at the time Lanny was subsequently interned. So too was Joe Di Ponio, and the Scappiticci's were personally affected by the loss of a relative when the ship SS Arandora Star, bound for Newfoundland, transporting Italian and German interns, was torpedoed by a German U-boat off the coast of Ireland. In all, 486 Italian and 175 German deportees were killed and the incident resulted in the British Government changing their policy on deporting interns overseas. Although those who can remember these incidents first hand were only children at that time, they made a deep impression. The 70th anniversary of the sinking of the Arandora in 2010 also brought these wartime events back into focus. The extract quoted to the right is from a poem by a Leith-born author and reflects his sentiments on those events:

=== International influence ===
Henderson, Giles Street The Vaults

Henderson Street still reflects the presence of Leith's immigrant population and the popularity of international food. The fact that Scappaticci's would eventually be replaced by the Raj Indian restaurant (i) is indicative of the post war influx of Asian immigrants to Scotland and the popularity of their food with the local population. The same could be said for the presence of Henderson Street's Chinese restaurant, Golden Bridge (vii). More recently, one of Henderson Street's oldest bars, The Bay Horse (located at number 63—65 and in operation as a spirit merchant since 1897) has succumbed to this international influence. Early photographic records show The Bay Horse circa 1910. Its proprietor, at that time, was a Charles G. Lane, who had been in possession of the pub since 1902. In the 1990s, the bar became Kalinka's (ix), a vodka bar operated by a Russian Countess and since 2005, the pub has once again been reincarnated as Sofi's (vi), now with a Swedish theme and Swedish owners.

Henderson Street Simpson Building & Shore view

=== Reaching new culinary heights ===
Leith and the Shore have garnered a reputation for fine dining and Michelin Star accolades in recent years. Plumed Horse (viii), which opened in 2007, obtained a Michelin Star in 2009.
