= Mabel L. Ramsay =

British medical doctor and suffragist

- Born: 1878; London, United Kingdom of Great Britain and Ireland
- Died: 9 May 1954 (aged 75); Sheffield, United Kingdom
- Education: Edinburgh College of Medicine for Women; University of Edinburgh; Cambridge University
- Occupations: Physician and suffragette

Mabel Lieda Ramsay (1878 – 9 May 1954) was a British medical doctor and suffragist, based in Plymouth. She was the third woman to become a fellow of the Royal College of Surgeons of Edinburgh and the first woman to be president of the Plymouth Medical Society. She was decorated for her work with the Women's Imperial Service as a doctor in Belgium and France during World War I.

== Early life and education ==
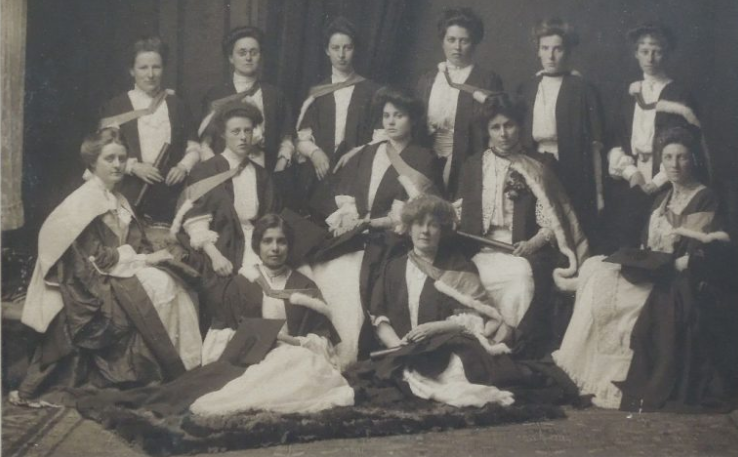
Mabel Ramsay (back row, second from left) amongst the female graduates in Medicine at Edinburgh University in July 1906

Mabel Ramsay was born in Wandsworth, London on 14 November 1878 to Scottish Naval officer Andrew John Ramsay and Annie Catherine (nee Theile), who was active in the suffrage movement into late life. Mabel Ramsay studied at the Edinburgh College of Medicine for Women, which had been jointly founded by the suffragist Elsie Inglis. Ramsay graduated MB ChB with distinction at the University of Edinburgh in 1906, alongside Agnes Marshall Cowan and Jessie Gellatly. She gained the DPH diploma from Cambridge University in 1908 and was awarded the degree of MD from the University of Edinburgh in 1910.

== Career ==
In 1906 she was house surgeon at Glasgow Maternity Hospital, then senior house surgeon at Women and Children's Hospital in Leeds. Subsequently, she worked for the public health service in Huddersfield as assistant Medical Officer of Health.

On 8 May 1921, Ramsay was elected a Fellow of the Royal College of Surgeons of Edinburgh, the third woman to achieve that distinction. In Plymouth, she was consulting gynaecologist and obstetrician at the City Hospital, the Infirmary, the Three Towns Maternity Home, the Salvation Army Maternity Home, and to the counties of Devon and Cornwall until her retirement in 1945.

During World War I, Ramsay served with radiologist Florence Stoney as a doctor with the Women's Imperial Service Hospital Unit at Antwerp and near Cherbourg. For her war service in Belgium she was awarded the Mons Star with Bar. Upon her return to Plymouth, she gave fundraising lectures on the war effort and women's role in war hospitals.

In 1929, she became a founding member of the Royal College of Obstetricians and Gynaecologists. She was also active on several committees and projects of the British Medical Association. Ramsay was the first woman to serve as president of the Plymouth Medical Society when she took office in 1930. She was a founding member of the Medical Women's Federation, and was president of that organisation from 1933 to 1934. She attended the Medical Women's International Association in Geneva in 1922, as part of the British delegation.

Ramsay was active with the Plymouth chapter of the National Union of Women's Suffrage Societies. In 1911, she and her mother hosted "a large party of census invaders", suffragists refusing to participate in the national census, at their home in Plymouth. Ramsay joined her mother for a leg of the women's march from London to Land's End in 1913, but her responsibility to her patients prevented her from completing the march in its entirety. In 1930, Ramsay was a founder of the Plymouth Soroptomist Club.

== Death and legacy ==
Ramsay died suddenly during a meeting of the Medical Women's Federation at Sheffield; she was 75 years old. "She herself would be delighted to know she ended her days still in harness," her colleague Annie Bryce commented on the circumstances of Ramsay's death.

In 2014, Ramsay became the first woman honoured with a blue plaque in Plymouth.

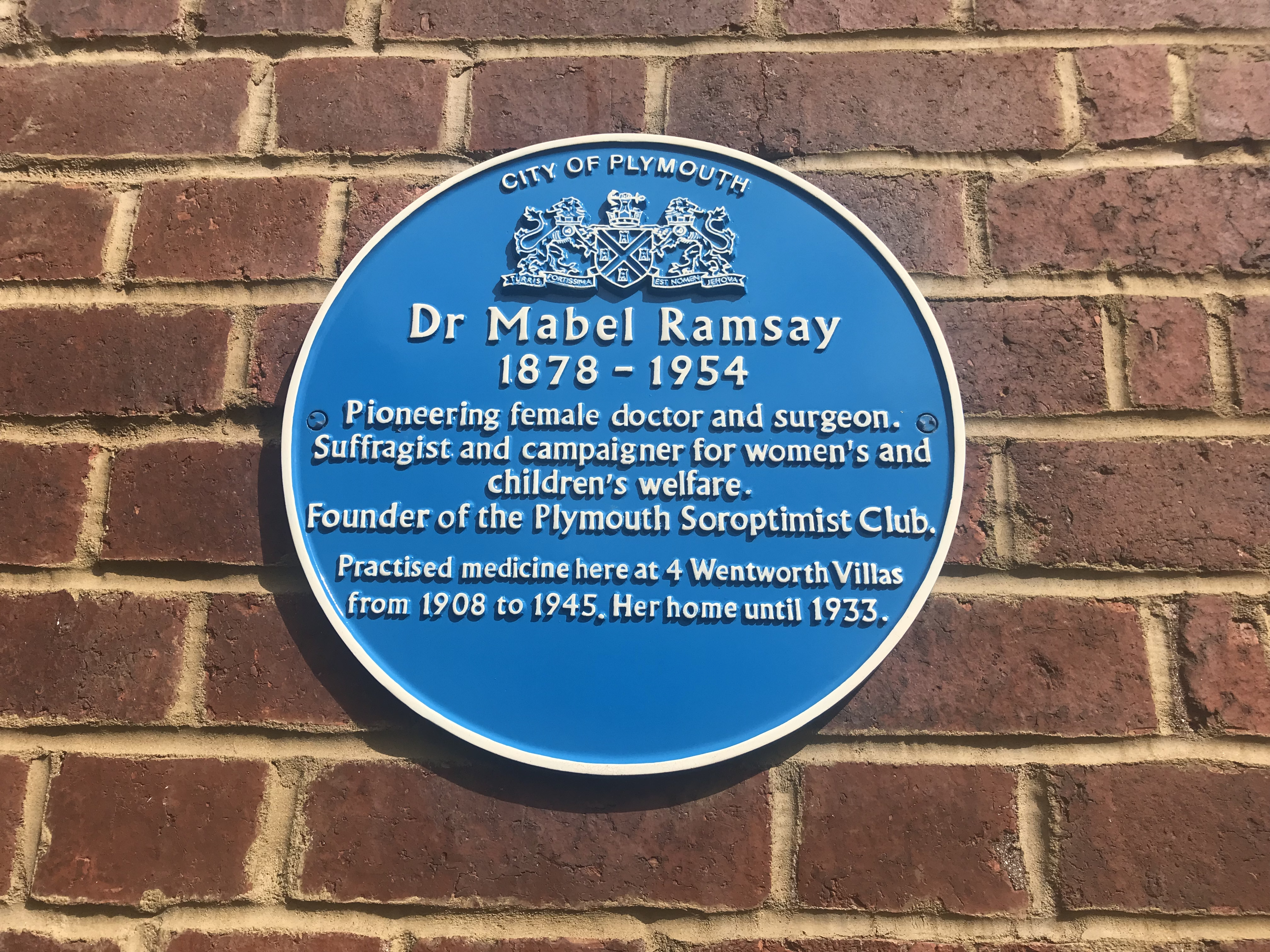
Dr Mabel Ramsay 1878-1954 Pioneering female doctor and surgeon. Suffragist and campaigner for women's and children's welfare. Founder of the Plymouth Soroptimist Club. Practised medicine here at 4 Wentworth Villas from 1908 to 1945. Her home until 1933.
