= John Henderson (Provost) =

Scottish surgeon and politician

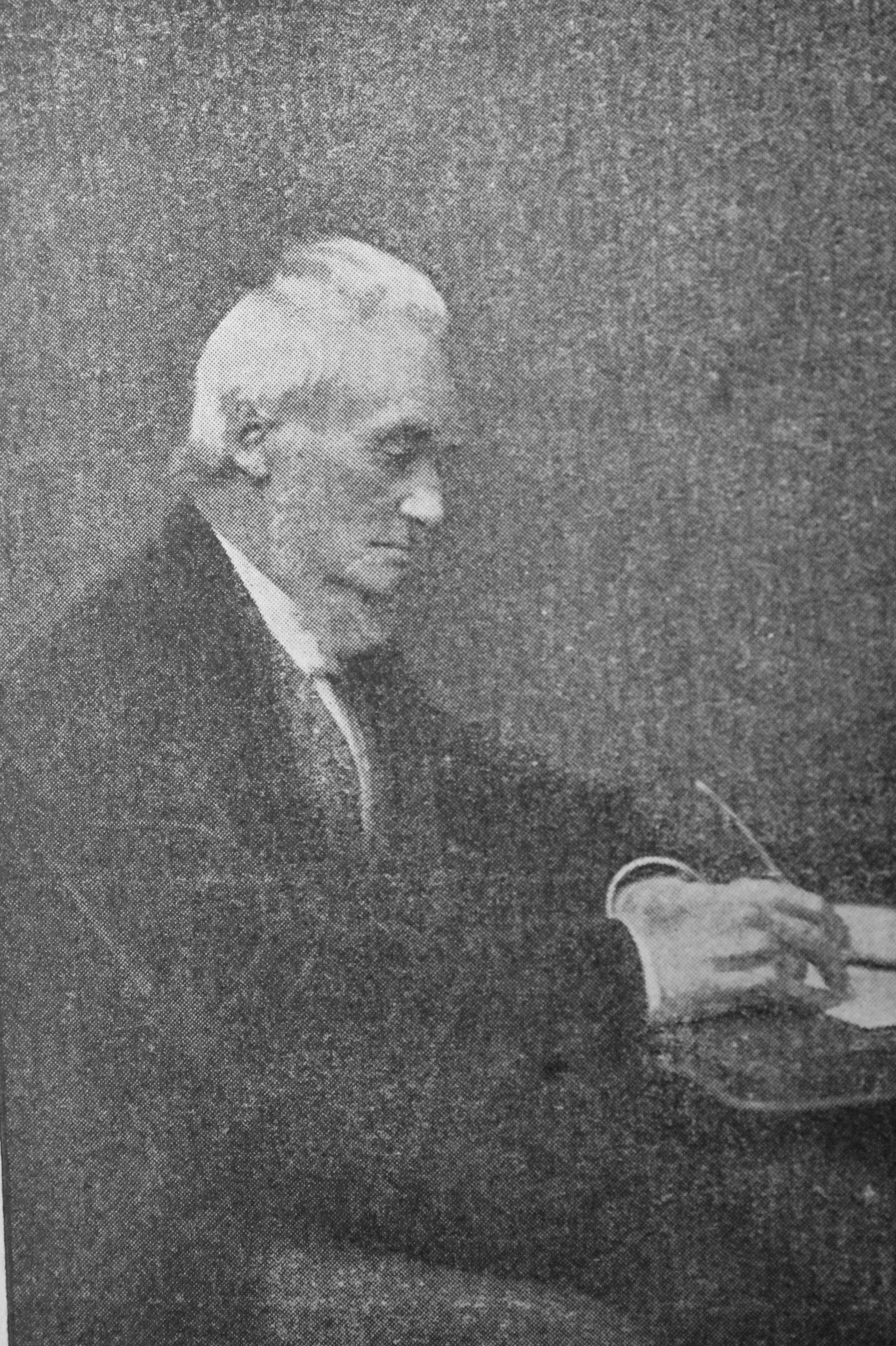
John Henderson, Provost of Leith

John Henderson (1818–1901) was a Scottish surgeon and politician, twice serving as Provost of Leith. Henderson Street in Leith is named in his honour. This formed part of his Leith Improvement Scheme of the 1880s, in which Henderson was instrumental, which transformed the face of Leith.

== Life ==
He was born near Jedburgh in 1818 and showed great intellect from an early age. He matriculated at Edinburgh University aged 14 and completed his degree in four years. After a year in France involved in literary matters he returned to Edinburgh and began the study of Medicine. After one year in Edinburgh, he travelled to France to complete his Diploma in Paris. He received his Diploma in Medicine as a qualified surgeon in 1845. He was asked to take the place of Dr Coldstream in Leith, the harbour area of Edinburgh due to Coldstream's ill health. Coldstream decided to move to Edinburgh on his recovery leaving Henderson in charge of Leith. This included the role of Chief Medical Officer of Leith Hospital from 1846 to 1886.

In 1850, he was living at 21 Charlotte Street in Leith (now called Queen Charlotte Street). From 1859, he was a High Constable also joining the Leith Volunteer Corps.

Henderson saw the lack of medical opinion within the town council as pivotal to the understanding of the health of the community. Failing to get any medical colleagues to stand in 1871 he himself joined Leith Town Council. He created a Public Health Committee of which he became the first Convener. He began a building by building survey of all poor properties in Leith. This took several years but little action could be taken until Henderson succeeded Provost James Watt as leader of the Leith Council in November 1875. Several ambitious plans had to be reduced in scale and a third scheme focussed on creation of a single street removing the worst slums between Great Junction Street and The Shore. This received Parliamentary consent in 1880 under the title of the Leith Improvement Scheme. This created both Henderson Street and the Model Lodging House on nearby Parliament Street.

In 1877, he amalgamated Leith Town Council with Leith Police Commission. This brought about the construction of a new cell block on Constitution Street, on the rear side of the Town Hall.

In 1880, he was living at 7 John's Place facing over Leith Links. In 1881 he was the official medical officer for Queen Victoria's inspection of the multiple Scottish regiments of Volunteers in the Queen's Park. A keen rifleman he took part in the Wimbledon Cup several times, winning several medals, but never the main trophy.

On the premature death of Provost James Pringle, Henderson briefly returned to the role of Provost of Leith until Thomas Aitken was formally elected to the role in 1887 due to Dr Henderson's voice wholly failing.

He died at his house on John's Place in 1901 and was buried in Warriston Cemetery.
