= Thomas Williamson (surgeon) =

Scottish surgeon

Dr Thomas Williamson FRSE FRCSE (1815–1885) was a Scottish surgeon at Leith Hospital and Medical Officer of Health for North Edinburgh.

== Life ==
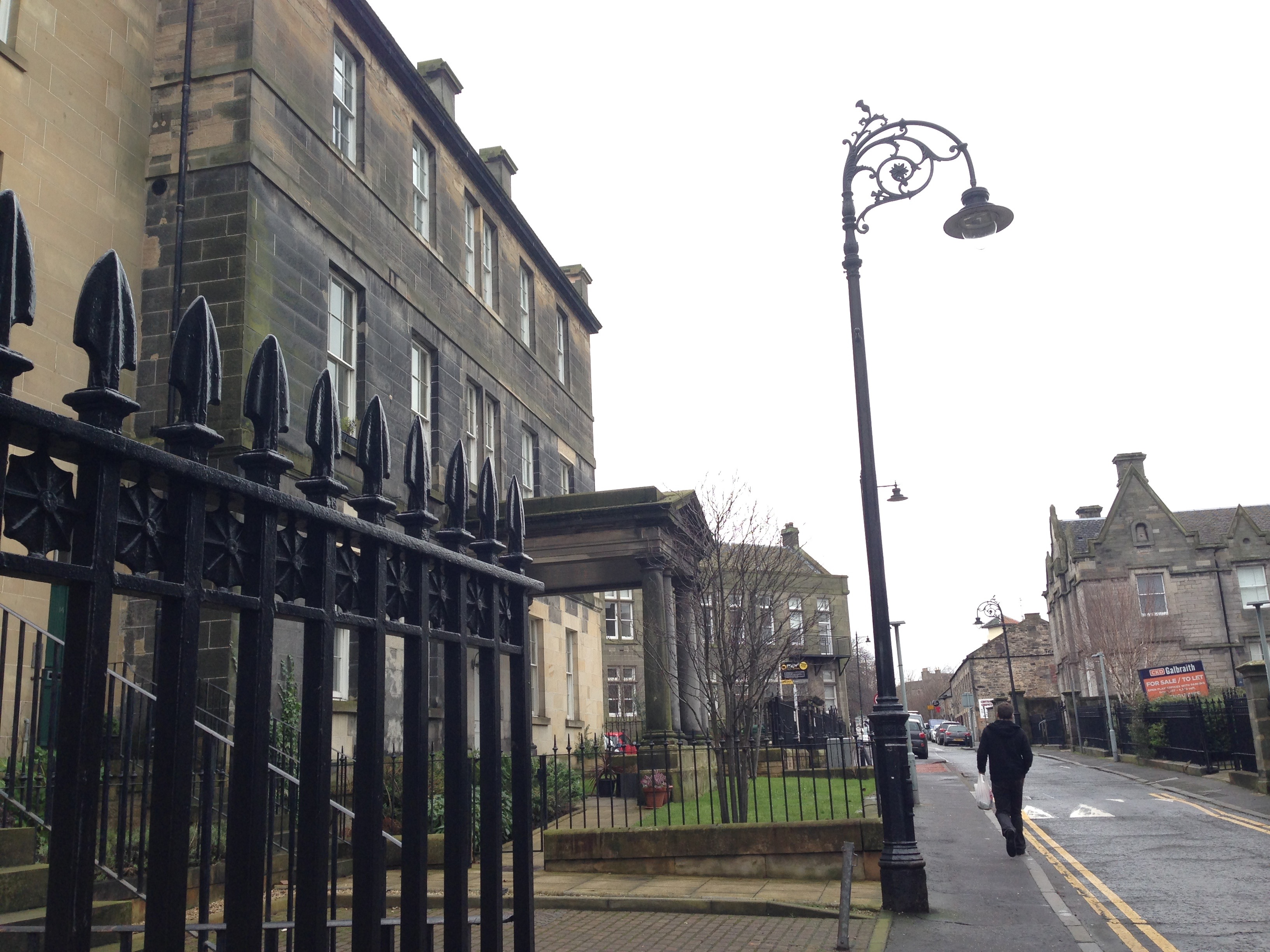
Leith Hospital (left) and Hospital for Incurables (right)

He was born in Greenock in 1815.

He studied medicine at the University of Edinburghgraduating with an MB ChB, and receiving his doctorate (MD) in 1835. He disappears from records until 1845 when he appears as a doctor in Leith living at first 51 then 35 Charlotte Street. During this period he became senior surgeon at Leith Hospital and remained in this role for over thirty years. He also oversaw the Leith Hospital for Female Incurables (an asylum opposite the hospital) and served as Leith's first medical officer of health.

In 1857 he was elected a Fellow of the Royal Society of Edinburgh. His proposer was Peter David Handyside.

In 1860 he was living at 40 Quality Street in Leith.

In 1885 he was one of the Fellows who proposed James Pringle, a near neighbour and Provost of Leith, as a Fellow of the Royal Society of Edinburgh.

He died on 30 December 1885 at 53 Charlotte Street in Leith, close to Leith Links (the street is now called Queen Charlotte Street).
