= John Cowan (steel merchant) =

Sir John Cowan LLD DL (12 December 1844–7 February 1929) was a 19th/20th century Scottish iron and steel merchant.

== Life ==
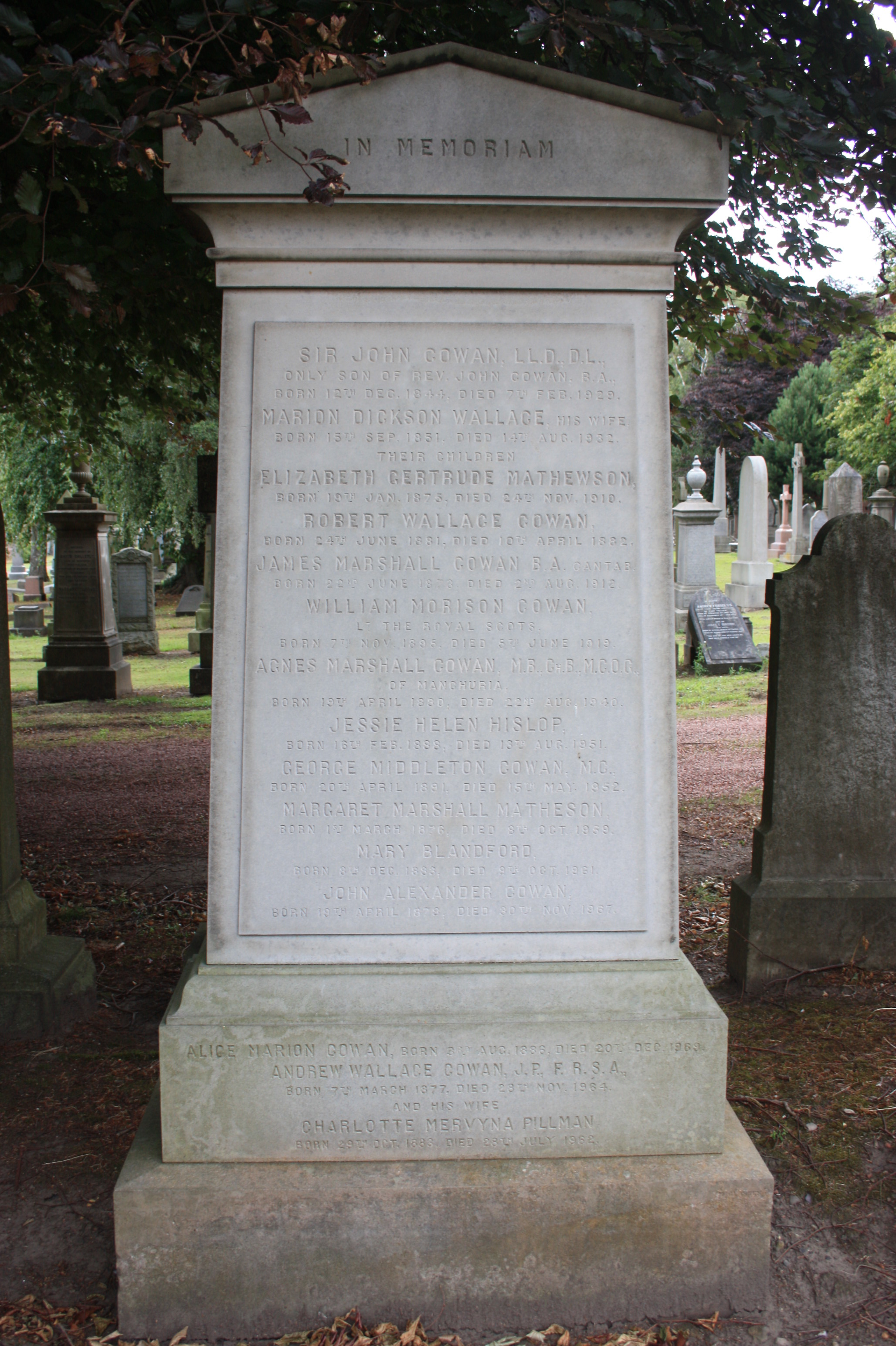
The grave of Sir John Cowan, Grange Cemetery

He was born on a ship going to Jamaica in the West Indies on 12 December 1844, the youngest of seven children and only son of Margaret Marshall (d.1886) and Rev John Cowan of the United Presbyterian Church of Scotland church in Jamaica. He spent his early life in Jamaica. He was educated at the Edinburgh Institution then studied at the University of Edinburgh.

In 1860 he was apprenticed to the firm of Redpath Brown & Co, iron and steel merchants, of 33 Candlemaker Row and 137 Constitution Street in Leith. At that time he lived with his maternal uncle, James Marshall (d.1873), at 15 Regent Terrace on Calton Hill.

By the 1870s Cowan lived in a flat at 28 Nelson Street in Edinburgh's New Town.

From 1880 until death he was living at 6 Salisbury Road, a large Victorian villa in the Grange.

From 1900 he was Treasurer and from 1901 to 1903 he was Master of the Merchants Hall in Edinburgh, replacing John Macmillan. In 1915 he was knighted by King Edward VII in his then role of Chairman of Redpath Brown.

He died at home 6 Salisbury Road on 7 February 1929, and is buried in the Grange Cemetery in south Edinburgh. The grave lies in the southeast section. His parents lie immediately to the north.

== Family ==
In 1872 he married Marion Dickson Wallace (1851–1932) in Dunfermline. They had at least 11 children, many dying in infancy.

Their son, William Morrison Cowan (1895–1919) died as results of wounds received in the First World War while serving in the Royal Flying Corps. Another son was Andrew Wallace Cowan FRSA (1877–1964).

Their daughter Agnes Marshall Cowan (1880–1940) was one of the first females to qualify as a physician at the University of Edinburgh. She served as a medical missionary in Manchuria (1913 to 1917) and as Medical Superintendent at the accident-prone "Devil's Porridge" explosive factory at Gretna (1917–18). In 1934 she became Professor of Obstetrics and Gynaecology in Mukden Medical College, the first Scottish female to gain a professorship.

== Artistic recognition ==
His portrait by Arthur Nowell is held in the Merchants Hall in central Edinburgh.
