= Leith Festival =

Arts festival in Edinburgh, Scotland

- Genre: Theatre, comedy, dance, music, art, poetry, film, sport
- Dates: 2018 9-17 June (exact dates vary each year)
- Locations: Leith, Edinburgh
- Years active: 1907–present
- Website: www.leithfestival.com

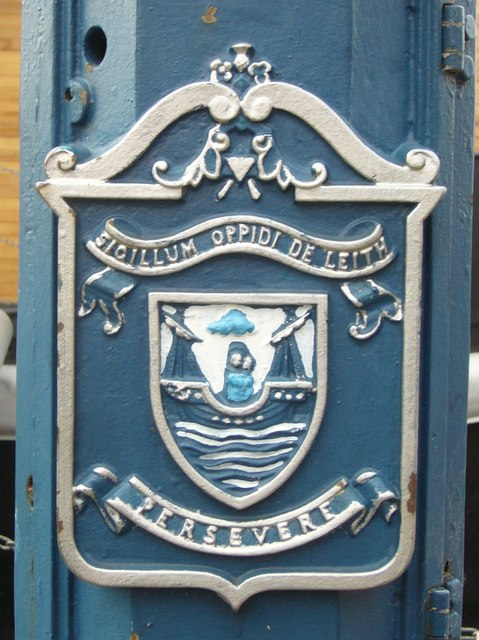
Lamp post showing Leith coat of arms

The Leith Festival is an arts festival held in the Leith area of Edinburgh and takes place mainly in the EH6 and EH7 postcodes of Edinburgh which cover the old burgh of Leith. It is a community based festival that takes place annually. It is run by the Leith Festival Association. It had been previously run by Leith Festival Club. The Edinburgh Short Film Festival, LeithLate and Leith Jazz and Blues Festival also run along the same time as the Leith Festival.

== Background ==
The current version of the Leith Festival started in the late 1980s. It takes place in June each year and includes Leith Festival Gala Day which started in 1907 as the Leith Gala. The Scotsman has reported that a precursor to the current day festival was established 100 years before the 2007 event. Leith Gala and Leith Pageant were started in order to raise money to pay for treatment at Leith Hospital before the days on the National Health Service. It continues with the role of fund raising with the parade and Gala day events, fun fair and stalls on Leith Links. There have been a number of festivals of various kinds held in Leith from The Edinburgh International Festival to the 1951 Festival of Britain and other local festivals. In the late 1960s an Art festival was set up as a community Festival. Over time the Gala expanded to become a community arts event being run continuously in its present form since the late eighties. It is supported by local businesses and funding (when available), and continues to be a much-anticipated annual event.

== Timeline ==
1907 First Leith Gala takes place annually.

1932 Leith Theatre (also known as Leith Town Hall and The Citadel Theatre) opened – many bands play this venue including Thin Lizzy 4 October 1975

1934 Royles Radio Rascals perform at the "Leith Hospital Pageant".

1936, 15 June The Scotsman reported "During the past fortnight entertainment of various kinds have been held on behalf of Leith Hospital and on Saturday these concluded with a number of outside concerts in the principal thoroughfares of Edinburgh and Leith." The Scotsman has reported the Festival under its various names since the beginning.

1947 Edinburgh Festival and Edinburgh Fringe Festival, which holds many events in Leith, starts

1952 – 1986 Leith Gazette is published – it carries many articles dealing with the festival and publishes an annual two-page photo spread entitled "Sunshine on Leith Festival"

1956 Leith Dockers Club opens

1961 – 1968 Leith Theatre used as venue by the Edinburgh International Festival

1972 Scottish International journal Vol 5, p34, reported that "Leith Festival was first dreamt of, it was as a community festival involving the people of Leith in providing their own entertainment and in helping themselves. It was a development of the squatters campaign in the slums at the foot of (Leith Walk)..."

1973 Festival program entitled "Programme of events for Britain's only free community festival."

1988 Leith Theatre closed, since 2004 Leith Theatre Trust has been set up to bring the theatre back into use

2004 Leith FM, later known as 98.8 Castle FM, starts as a two-week festival broadcast

2005 Irvine Welsh opens festival with first reading of new material at Leith Dockers Club

2010 Tom Allan wrote in The Guardian of 30 May 2010 that "This year's ten-day Leith Festival got off to a flying start over the weekend with Leith Gala Day. There was a Samba band and dancers, a giant sound system for Edinburgh reggae legends Messenger, and hundreds of stalls sporting everything."

2011 The festival was launched with a Wool Bomb attack. The BBC reported that "Trees have been wrapped in woolly jumpers as part of a guerrilla arts project to mark the start of the Leith Festival."

=== Past performers & appearances ===
- Kevin Bridges comedian
- Sandra Brown, writer, broadcaster and actress
- Citadel Arts Group
- Leith Community & Concert Band
- Kingdom Theatre
- Raymond Mearns Actor & Comedian
- Janey Godley stand-up comedian and writer
- Irvine Welsh Scottish novelist, playwright and short story writer

== Bibliography ==
- Leith Gazette 1952 – 1986
- The Scotsman
- Edinburgh Evening News
- The Speaker, No.107, June 2013
- The Skinny
- The List
- The Leither Magazine Issue 94
- The Guardian

Programs are held by Edinburgh City Libraries 1990-96; 1998-99; 2002-09 and the National Library of Scotland 1971; 1973; 1990; 1994

== See also ==
- Edinburgh Festival
- Edinburgh Festival Fringe
