= Agnes Marshall Cowan =

Scottish physician (1880–1940)

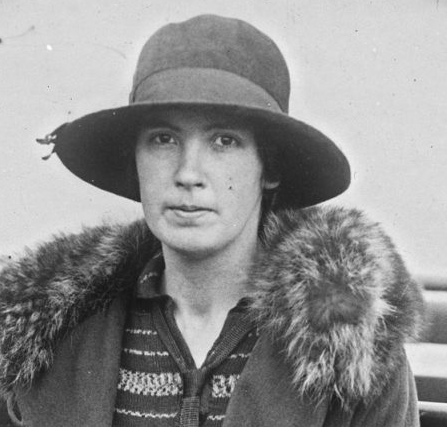
Agnes M Cowan (aged 31)

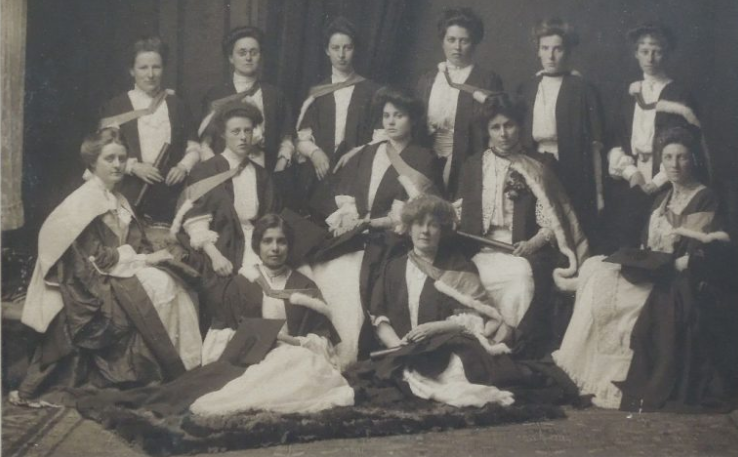
Agnes Cowan (top left) amongst the female graduates in Medicine at the University of Edinburgh in July 1906

Agnes Marshall Cowan MRCOG (19 April 1880–22 August 1940) was a Scottish physician who was one of the first fully qualified female physicians in the UK, and a medical missionary in Manchuria during the Manchurian plague. She oversaw medical issues in the "Devil's Porridge" explosive factory at Gretna serving the demand for explosives during the First World War.

In 1934 she was the first Scottish female to be granted a professorship, but not until 1940 was a professorship granted within Scotland itself (Margaret Fairlie).

== Life ==
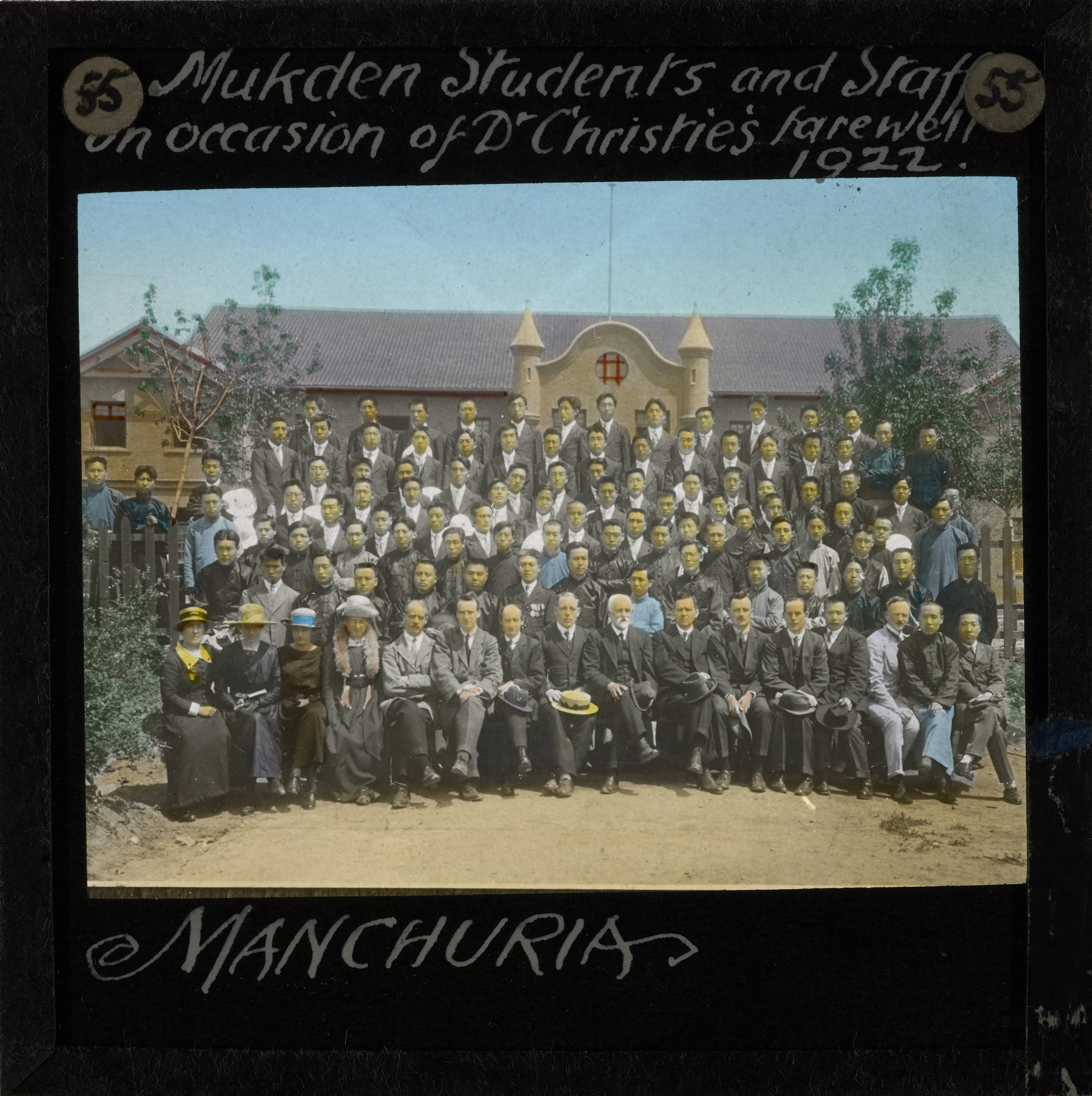
Mukden College: students and staff (Agnes is thought to be in front row sitting on far left)

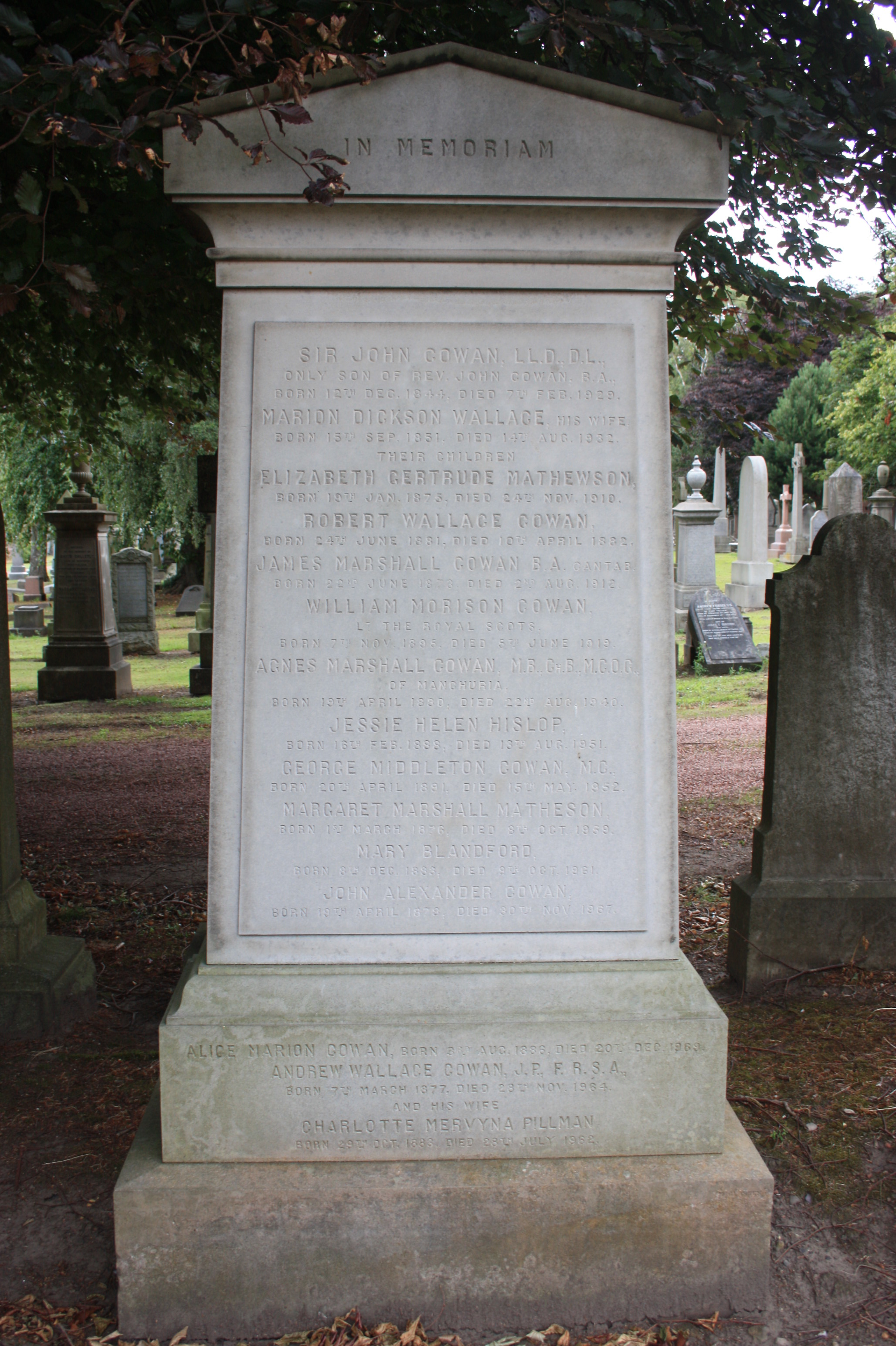
The grave of the Cowan family, Grange Cemetery

She was born on 19 April 1880 in Edinburgh the daughter of Marion Dickson Wallace (1851–1932) and John Cowan. She was the sixth of eleven children and the family lived in a large stone villa in the Grange district in the south of the city.

Cowan was one of the first female students admitted to the University of Edinburgh and studied medicine alongside Jessie Gellatly, Mabel L. Ramsay and others. They all graduated MB ChB in July 1906.

Following graduation in the summer of 1906 she and Jessie Gellatly joined the staff at Leith Hospital in north Edinburgh, the first hospital to accept female physicians.

She parted company with her friend Jessie around 1908 and went to work as a surgeon at the Eye Department of Edinburgh Royal Infirmary. In the summer of 1911 she was motivated to leave Scotland and travelled to China as a medical missionary to address the outbreak of pneumonia in the north, known in the UK as the Manchurian plague. She was part of a large British contingent requested by the Chinese physician Wu Lien-teh to address the disaster.

In 1914 she was working in a hospital at Ashiho near Harbin. In 1915 she moved to a Mukden Medical College to work with fellow Edinburgh physician Dugald Christie. Both of these ventures were financially supported jointly by the Church of Scotland and the University of Edinburgh. Manchuria at this time was under Imperial Russian influence and the overall environment of both plague and political unrest was far from easy. The area was also troubled by bandits who would raid the towns and hospitals and would sometimes take equipment and medicine. Nevertheless, Cowan stayed for many years before being forced to leave in the aftermath of the Russian Revolution of 1917.

In 1915, her father was knighted and her parents became Sir John Cowan and Lady Marion Cowan.

Possibly through her father's influence, Cowan returned from China and took up a commission as a Medical Officer in the Queen Mary's Army Auxiliary Corps attached to the Royal Army Medical Corps. In this capacity, she worked at HM Factory, Gretna commonly known as the "Devil's Porridge" factory, where thousands of tons of explosives were manufactured for use on the Western Front. Here she served as assistant to Dr Thomas Goodall Nasmyth. Her duties here included treating victims of explosions and attending the side effects of breathing and touching the caustic substances. After the Armistice in November 1918 the factory was quickly decommissioned.

In 1919 she returned her previous position in Mukden Medical College in Manchuria which remained under the Principalship of Dugald Christie. In 1934, due to its strong links with the University of Edinburgh, the college became the first outside the UK to have a medical degree recognised in Scotland. Cowan certainly formed part of this decision: in 1934 she had made a Member of the Royal College of Obstetricians and Gynaecologists and the college granted her a Professorship in Obstetrics and Gynaecology in 1934.

However, from September 1931, things had started to go wrong, due to the Japanese invasion of Manchuria, which included the capture of Harbin in February 1932. Mukden was further inland and of less military significance. However, as the Japanese control spread and with the imminent onset of the Second World War Cowan left Manchuria in the summer 1939, never to return. Her health by this stage was poor, her parents were dead and she had lost her Edinburgh connection.

It is thought Cowan lived her final months with mutual friends in Cambridge, and she died there on 22 August 1940 aged 60. Her body was returned to Edinburgh and she was buried with her family in Grange Cemetery in south Edinburgh. The grave lies in the eastmost strip section, facing east, in the south-east portion of the main cemetery.
