= Leith Hospital =

- NHS Lothian
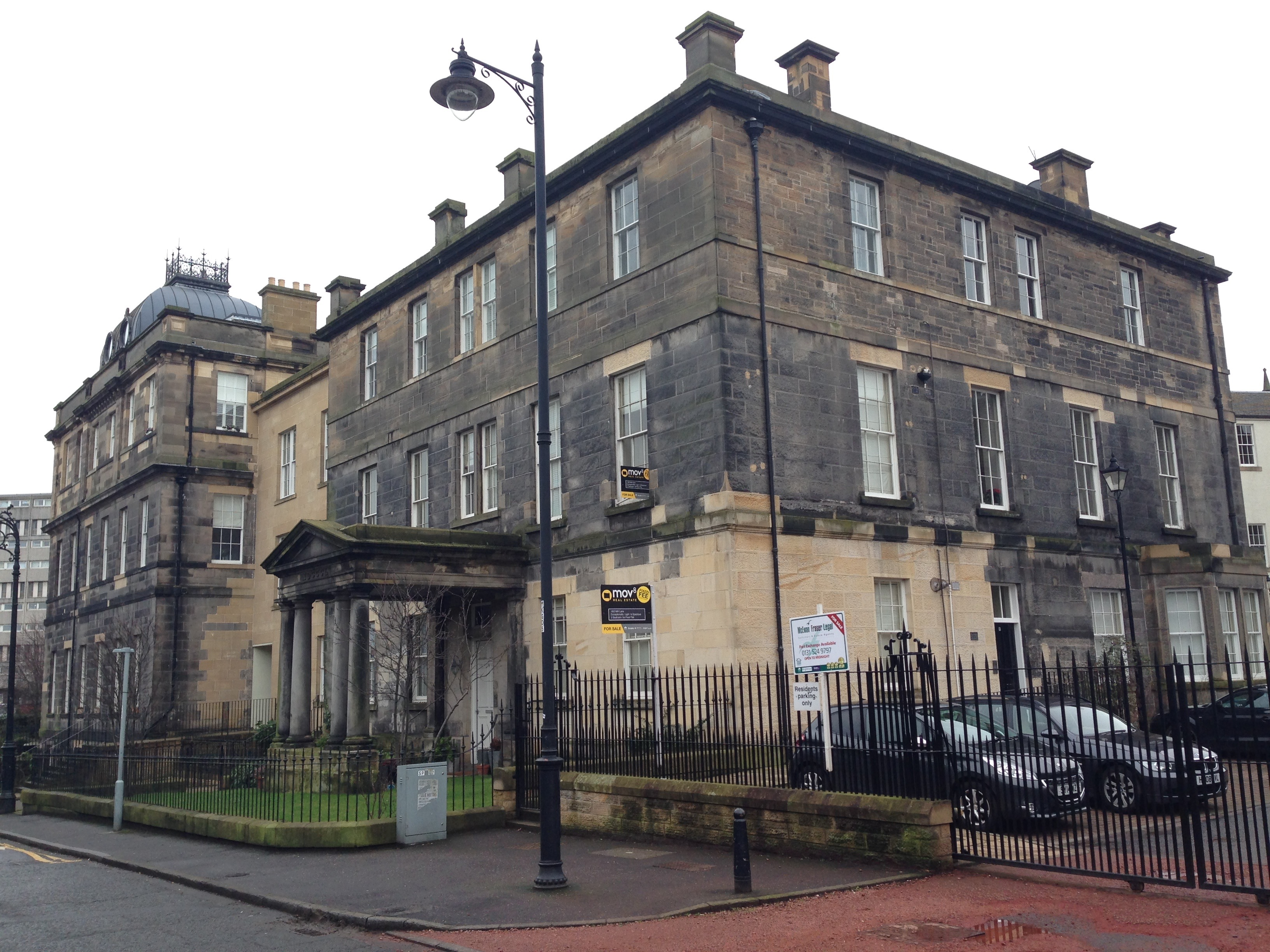
- Leith Hospital from Mill Lane

- Shown in Edinburgh

Geography
- Location: Edinburgh, Scotland
- Coordinates: 55.9745269°N 3.1786133°W

Organisation
- Care system: NHS Scotland

Services
- Emergency department: No

History
- Founded: 1851
- Closed: 1987

Links
- Lists: Hospitals in Scotland

Leith Hospital was situated on Mill Lane in Leith, Edinburgh, and was a general hospital with adult medical and surgical wards, paediatric medical and surgical wards, a casualty department and a wide range of out-patient services. It closed in 1987.

== History ==
=== Origins ===
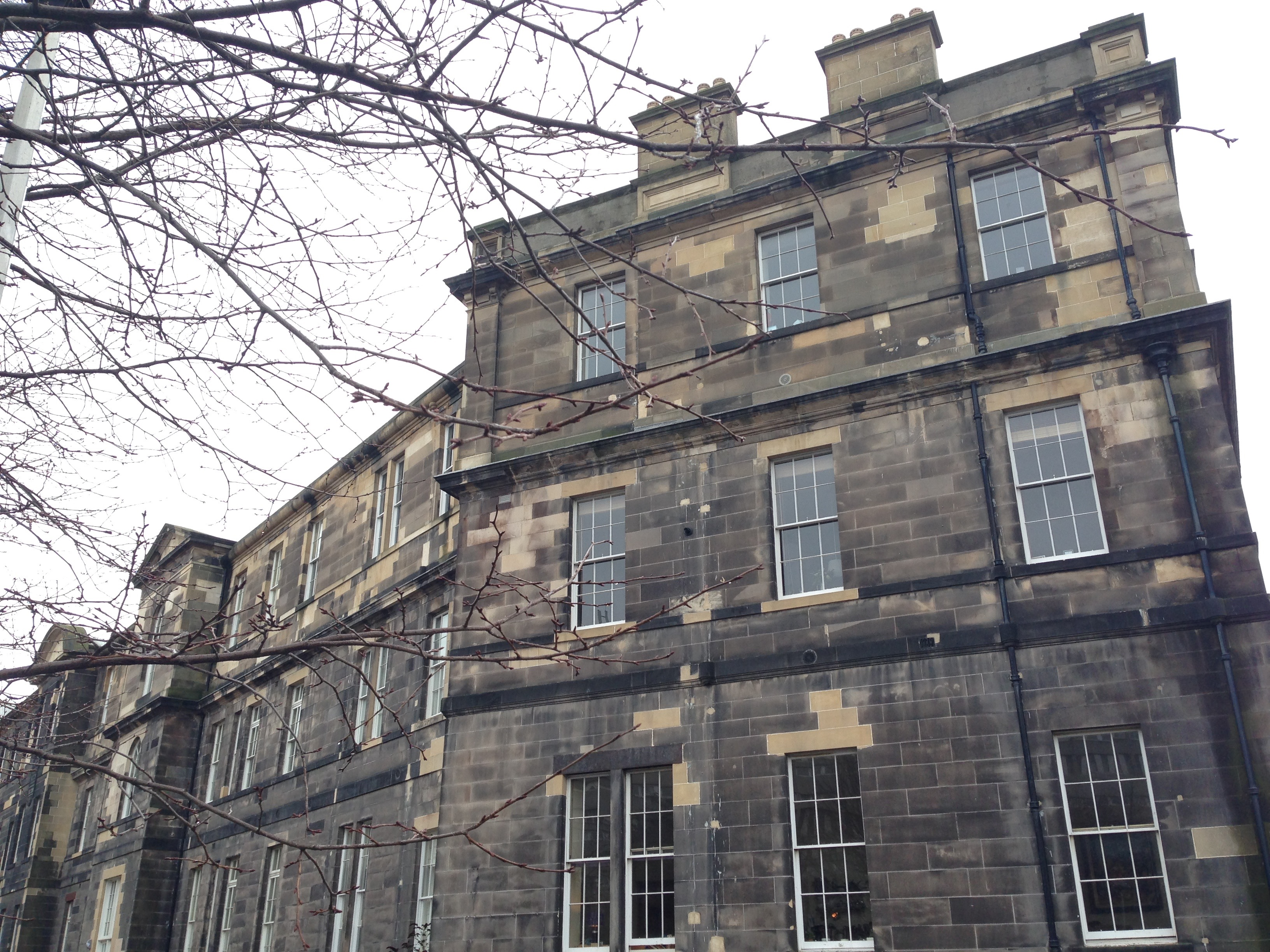
Medical block, Leith Hospital, Mill Lane

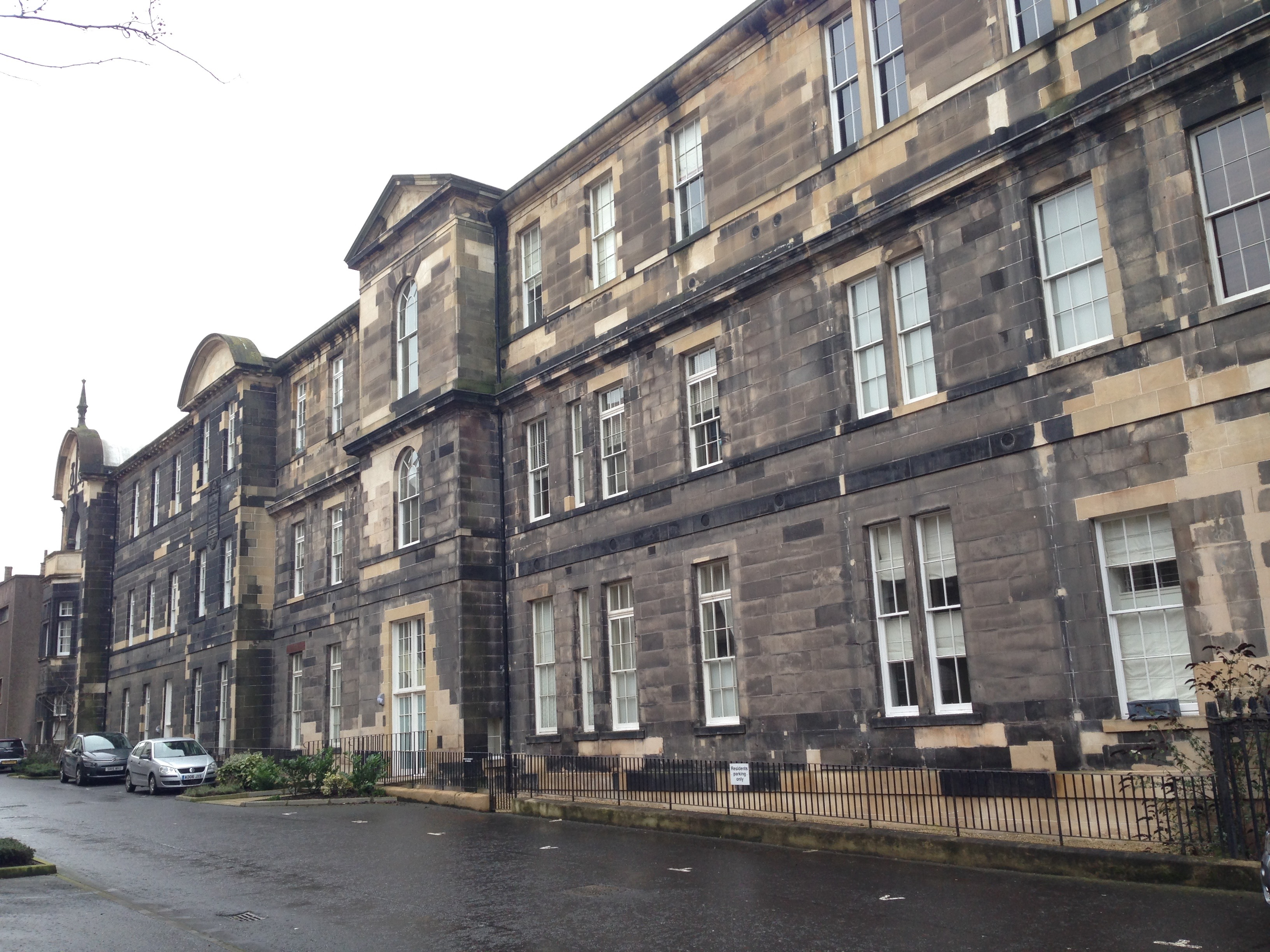
The King Street Jubilee Wing of Leith Hospital, which housed the surgical block

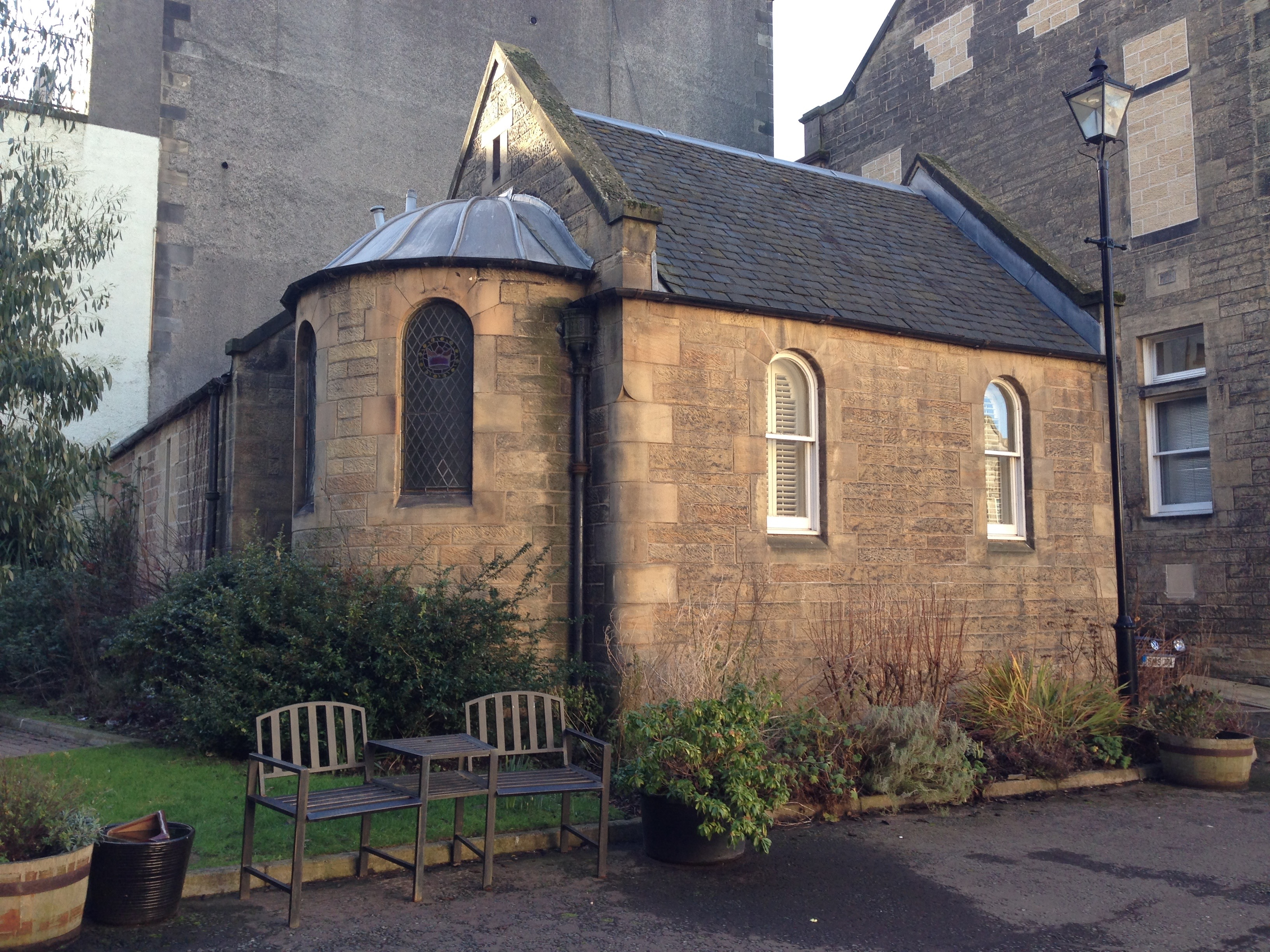
Leith Hospital Chapel

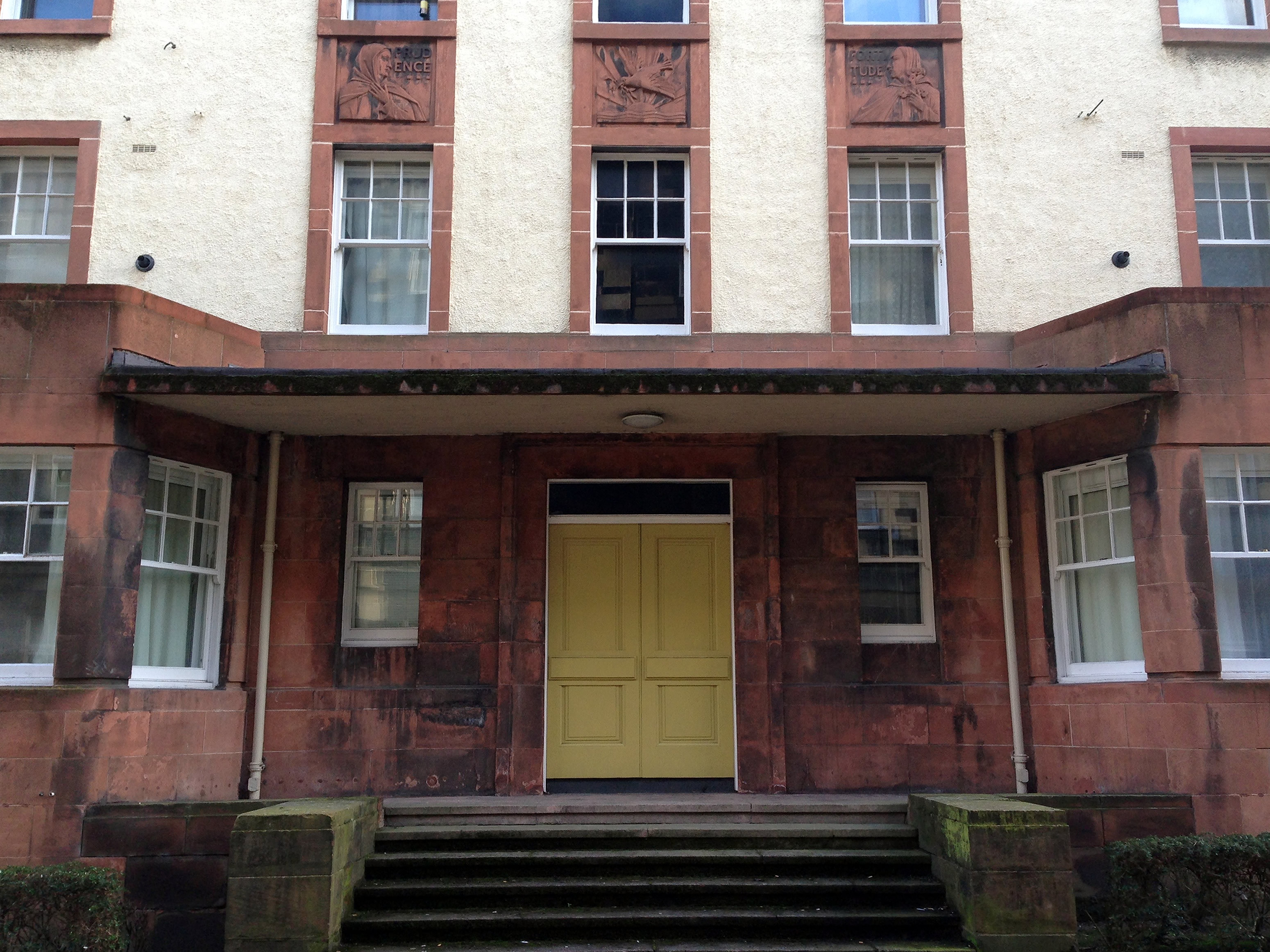
Entrance to 40's extension of Leith Hospital Nurses Home, showing plaques engraved with the mottoes Prudence and Fortitude

The King James Hospital, in the Kirkgate, which was named after King James VI, who awarded a charter to the hospital, was founded in 1614. The hospital was demolished in 1822, although part of the wall can still be seen today, forming the boundary between the Kirkgate and south Leith Kirkyard.

In the late 18th century the Humane Society, which promotes lifesaving intervention, established a presence in Leith, at first in Burgess Close and Bernard Street and then in Broad Wynd. In 1816, a dispensary was opened, also in Broad Wynd, at number 17, a few doors along from the Humane Society room. Founded by Dr. Andrew Duncan (1744–1828), the dispensary consisted of a consulting room, a small laboratory and a single bed. In 1825, the Humane Society and the dispensary combined, to form the Leith Dispensary and Humane Society. In 1837, the Leith Dispensary and Humane Society extended their activities by moving to a large house in Quality Street, now (Maritime Street), in what effectively became a Casualty Hospital.

By the 1840s, Leith was an independent burgh of some 40,000 people and pressure increased to establish and fund a new hospital. A public meeting in 1846 was called, it was agreed that the new institution would be called "The Leith Hospital"; a committee was formed and £115 was collected in subscriptions. Donations made towards the hospital included £1,000 from the estate of John Stewart of Laverockbank, but it was several years before agreement could be reached about the best site and for work to start. In 1850, the year before the opening of the new hospital, the Dispensary had dealt with 2,699 patients, the Casualty Hospital had treated 245 patients and the Humane Society seven patients.

The new building was planned by a committee which included the provost, baillies, local ministers, businessmen and doctors. A plot of land was purchased at the upper end of Sheriff Brae in 1849. The new hospital was built facing Mill Lane and was a two-storey building, with fever patients housed on the upper floor and the Humane Society, dispensary and casualty on the ground floor. The hospital opened to patients in 1851.

=== The early years ===
Much of the funding required to maintain the hospital was raised within the local Leith community. The new hospital incorporated the functions of the Casualty Hospital and the Dispensary. The first consulting physician to the hospital was James Scarth Combe (1796–1883), best known for his 1822 description of pernicious anaemia some years before that of Thomas Addison (1739–1860) whose name remains associated with the condition. In 1875 an extension to the hospital was built in King Street to meet increasing demand for its services. Another early physician was Dr John Coldstream (1806–1863).

In 1866, the hospital appointed its first district nurse, Mrs. Brown “to carry out faithfully the doctors’ orders, to instruct the relations or friends of the patient in the art of good nursing and to inculcate, and if necessary enforce, attention to cleanliness”. The hospital paid for her to attend a nursing course at King's College, London. Popular and hardworking she made 13,000 home visits in 1877 alone.

In 1874, the hospital appointed its first qualified Lady Superintendent of Nursing.

Two further extensions were added to the hospital in 1873 and 1888. In 1903 to mark Queen Victoria’s jubilee a new major extension, the surgical block, was opened on King Street facing the nurses’ home which had been built on the opposite side of the street. The two buildings were connected by tunnel running under King Street.

=== Teaching for medical students ===
Following the establishment by Sophia Jex-Blake (1840–1912) of the Edinburgh School of Medicine for Women, in 1887 the Hospital Directors gave Jex Blake permission to allow her female medical students to attend Leith Hospital for comprehensive clinical teaching. The arrangement began well.

In 1888, however, an incident in the hospital would lead to the demise of Jex-Blake’s School of Medicine for Women. Jex-Blake had a strict rule that students must leave the hospital by 5pm. In breach of this rule, four students stayed on to follow a case after hours. Jex-Blake dismissed two, Ina and Grace Cadell. Both successfully sued Jex-Blake and the school for wrongful dismissal.

The lawsuit was widely publicised. Together with wider opposition to medical education for women at the time, this put further pressure on Jex-Blake. The Edinburgh School of Medicine for Women closed in 1898.

=== The 20th century ===
At the start of the 20th century, Leith was a modern busy hospital, at last able to meet the health needs of the community which it served. The pressure on beds was further relieved by the opening of the East Pilton Fever Hospital in 1896.

In 1906 the first output of fully qualified physicians from Edinburgh University arrived and of these both Jessie Gellatly and Agnes Marshall Cowan joined the staff of Leith Hospital.

In 1908 the South Leith poorhouse moved to Seafield where it later became the Eastern General Hospital. The vacated site which fronted onto Great Junction Street was bought by the hospital in 1911 in the hope that it might be used for future expansion.

The Leith community was devastated by the death of many of its young men on their way to fight in the First World War. The Quintinshill rail disaster in May 1915 resulted in 226 fatalities of whom 214 were soldiers of the 7th Battalion (Leith’s Own) Royal Scots on their way to Gallipoli. This remains Britain's worst rail disaster. A school of nursing was established and recognised by the general nursing Council in 1923.

As communities raised funds for war memorials, the Leith community decided that their war memorial should take the form of the children's wing for Leith Hospital. Fundraising started in 1919. Many individual benefactors supported the hospital by endowing beds, in memory of relatives killed in action in the First World War. The new building, which was designed by George Simpson, opened in January 1927. The new children's wing had a royal visit from the Duke and Duchess of Kent in May 1935. The hospital joined the National Health Service in 1948.

=== Closure ===
Leith Hospital closed in 1987, with the buildings converted to residential units. Local protests, including a petition to keep the hospital open, were unsuccessful. The building was sold for £1.6 million. Seventeen years later, the Leith Community Treatment Centre opened in Junction Place, offering a reduced range of services.

In October 2011, the Edinburgh-based Citadel Arts Group published Leith Hospital Recalled, a collection of memories from 50 contributors who were treated in or worked at the hospital. The project was funded by the Leith Benevolent Trust. A play based on the stories in the book, Leith's Hidden Treasure, was produced by the same group in 2012. Written by Laure C Paterson, the play was performed as part of the Leith Hospital Project, at the 2012 Leith Festival.

== Notable staff ==
Notable staff included:

- Thomas Addison
- Edwin Bramwell
- John Coldstream
- James Scarth Combe
- John Henderson
- Thomas Latta
- Andrew Russell Murray
- A. A. Scot Skirving
- Thomas Williamson
- Sir David Wilkie
- Eliza Warden Paterson (1846-1936), Matron 1892-1907.

As one of the first hospitals to allow the teaching of women medical students on its wards, Leith was also one of the first to appoint female house surgeons and house physicians. The first female house physician was Dr Marion Ritchie, appointed in 1890, followed by Dr Agnes MacLaren the following year. Dr Mabel Ross was house physician in 1904 and Jessie Gellatly and Agnes Marshall Cowan were appointed in 1906.
