= James Pringle (Provost) =

Scottish rope manufacturer

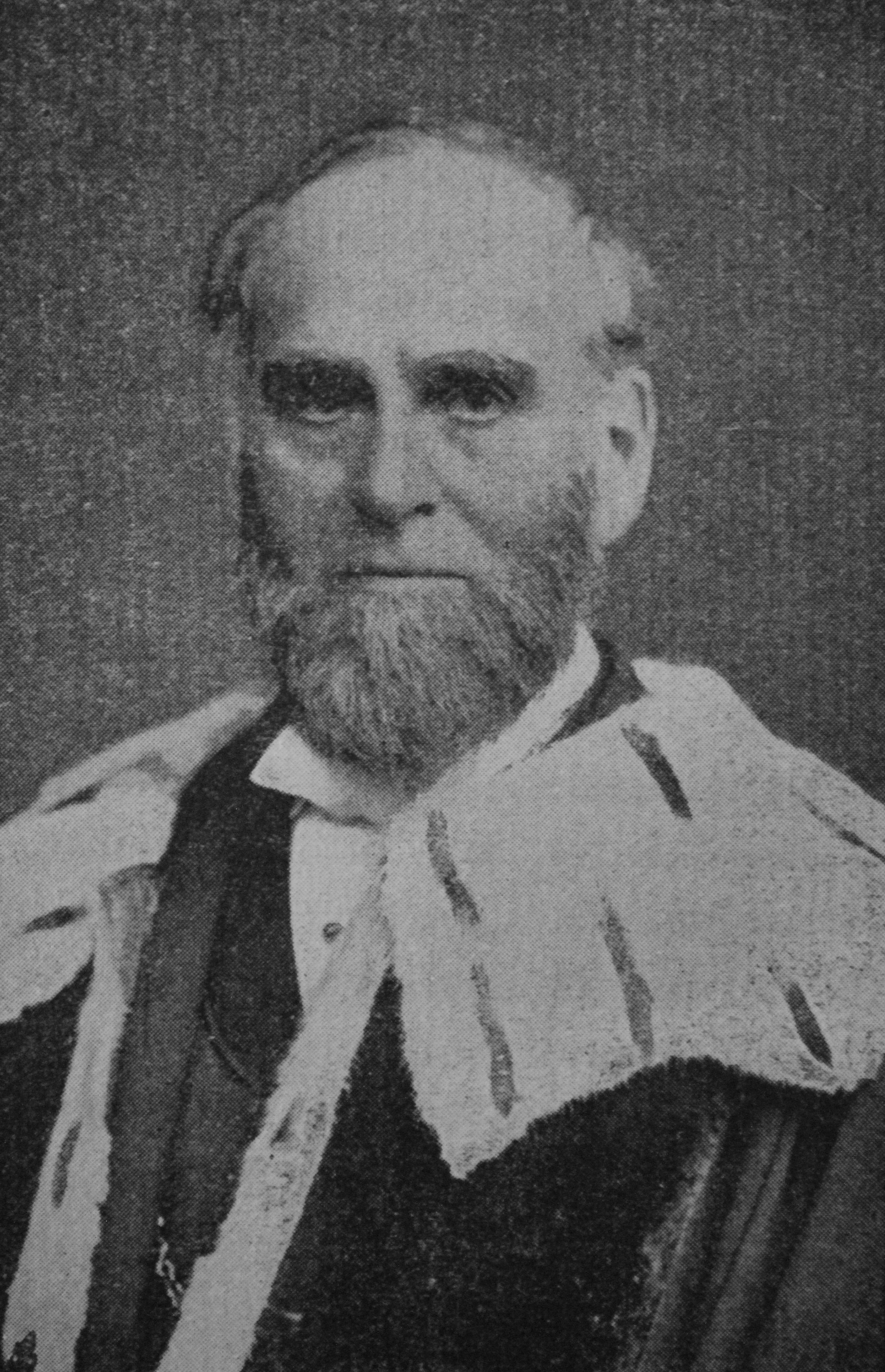

James Pringle (1822–1886) was a Scottish rope manufacturer who served as Provost of Leith 1881 until 1886.

== Life ==
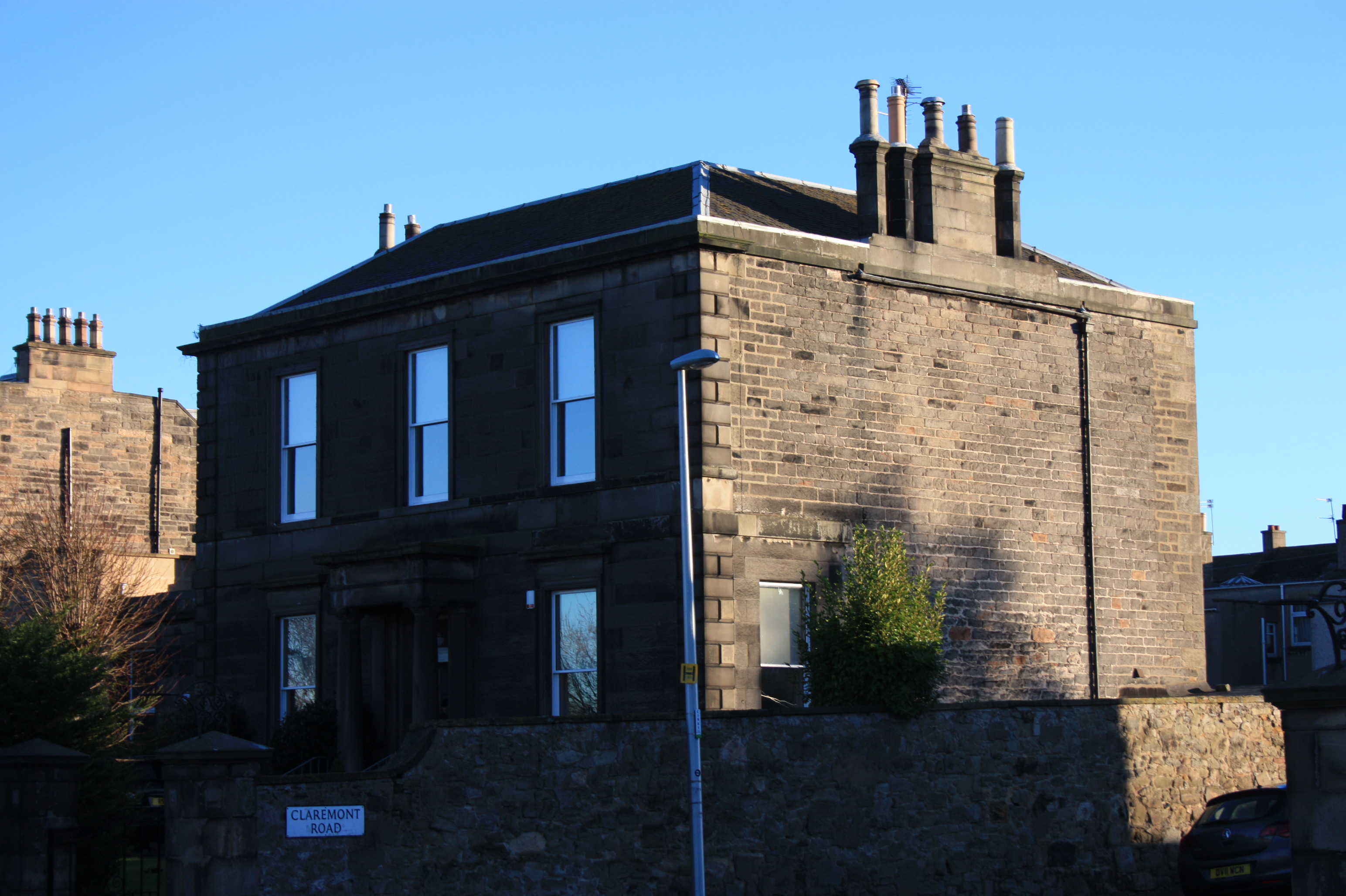
7 Claremont Park on Leith Links

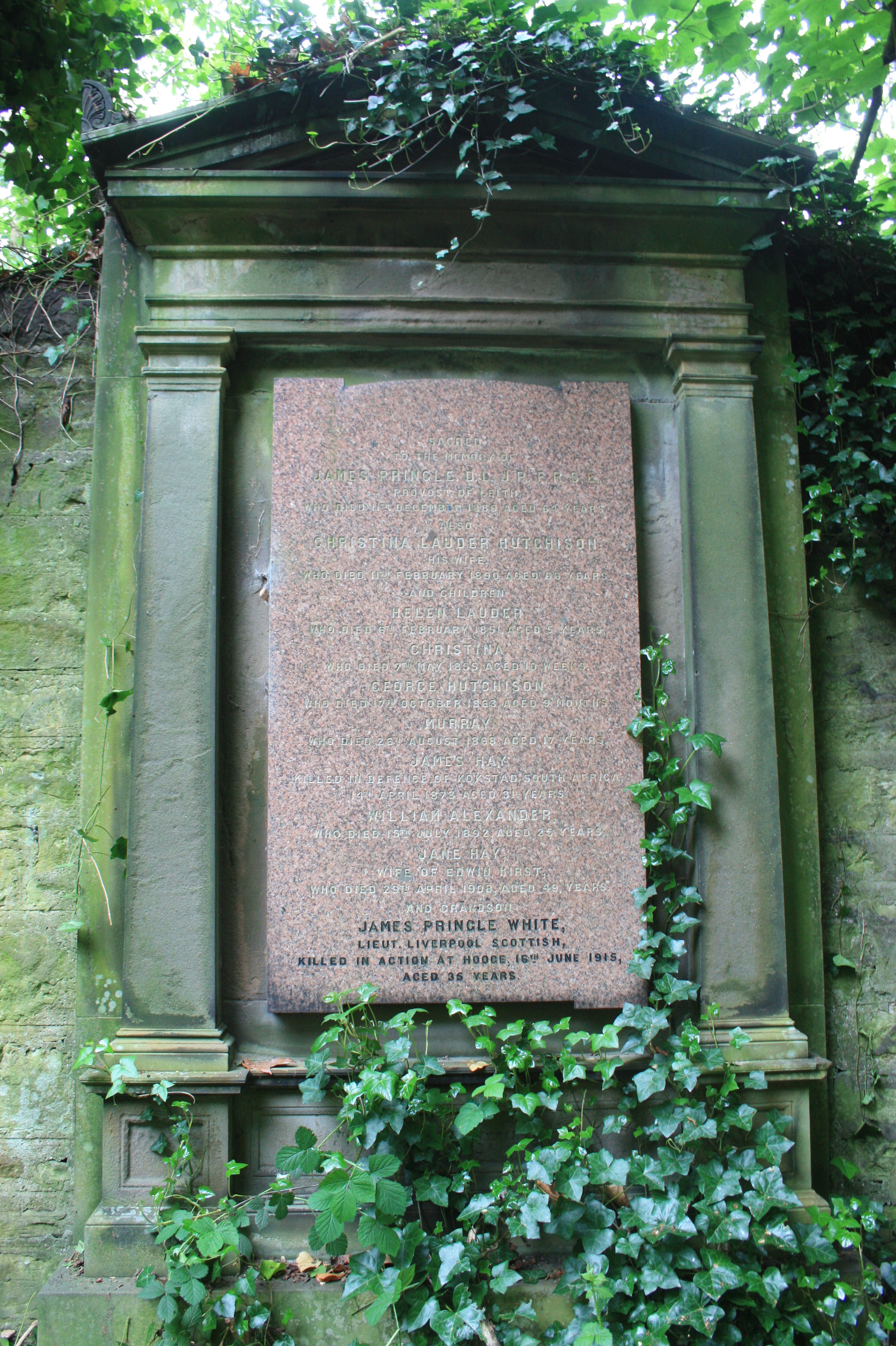
The grave of James Pringle, Warriston Cemetery

He was born in 1822 the son of William Murray Pringle of the Edinburgh Naval and Military Academy. The family lived at 23 Bread Street. James was educated at the High School in Edinburgh. He was at the school during its relocation from High School Yards to Calton Hill in 1829.

In 1840 his father was working from the Adjutant General's Office at 1 Grove Street in Edinburgh.

From 1841 he worked as a clerk at the Edinburgh Rope Company on the north side of Leith Links. He was then living at 15 Thomsons Place in Leith. By 1855 it had become Edinburgh Ropery and Sailcloth Manufactury and he had become Manager. He was by this time living at a relatively new villa, designed by Thomas Hamilton, facing over Leith Links to his place of work, from Claremont Park.

In 1880 he joined Leith Dock Commission. He was also elected President the Leith Liberal Club.

He entered Leith Town Council in 1881 and became Provost later in the same year. He was a strong advocate of the Leith Improvement Scheme. begun by his predecessor, John Henderson. He especially pushed for the. creation of Leith Links as a public park, levelling the area (it is noted that this greatly improved the view from his house.

In 1885 he was both created Deputy Lieutenant of the County of the City of Edinburgh and elected a Fellow of the Royal Society of Edinburgh. His proposers were Dr Thomas Williamson, Sir James Falshaw, James Grant and Sir Thomas Grainger Stewart. He was also elected Deputy Lieutenant of Edinburgh in the same year.

He was a pivotal figure in transferring the supply of town gas from private control to city corporation control. On death, he was superseded on an interim basis by former provost John Henderson before the formal election in 1887 of Thomas Aitken.

He died of dry pleurisy at home, 7 Claremont Park on Leith Links on 11 December 1886. He is buried in Warriston Cemetery against the southern wall of the main cemetery. The grave lies immediately to the right of the huge monument to David Low.

He was a member of the United Presbyterian Church and was elder of the church on Broughton Place from 1854 and clerk to the congregation from 1868.

== Family ==
In 1844 aged 22 he was married to Christina Lauder Hutchison (d.1890). His wife continued to live at Claremont Park until 1890.

They had twelve children only seven of whom survived to old age: two daughters, Christina, Helen and Jane (who married Edwin Hirst).

Their sons were David, Murray, James Hay and William Alexander.

Their son James Hay Pringle was killed in defence of Kokstad in South Africa in April 1878.

Their grandson Lt James Pringle White served in the Liverpool Scottish and was killed at Hooge in the First World War.

== Artistic recognition ==
His portrait as Provost was painted by John A. Horsburgh in 1885 and is now held by the City of Edinburgh Council.
