= Oban and District =

Defunct bus operator in Scotland

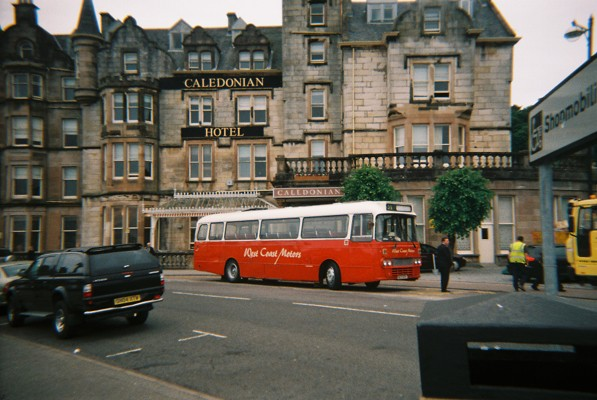
A former Oban & District Leyland Leopard in service with West Coast Motors in 2006

Oban and District was a bus operator formed from the sale of the Oban depot of Midland Scottish in 1992.

== History ==
Scottish Bus Group's operations in Oban had previously been operated by Highland Scottish, but were transferred to Midland Scottish in the run-up to privatisation in 1991. Midland was taken over by GRT Group, who decided that the operation was too remote from Midland's other depots to be financially viable. The company was sold to its management in 1992, although GRT retained a minority share. At its creation Oban and District owned 20 buses, mainly Leyland Leopard single-deckers, and used a blue and cream livery similar to the colours introduced to Midland's operations by GRT.

The company was taken over by West Coast Motors at the end of 1999. It still exists but trades as a depot of West Coast Motors.
