= Midland Scottish =

Former Scottish Bus Group bus operator

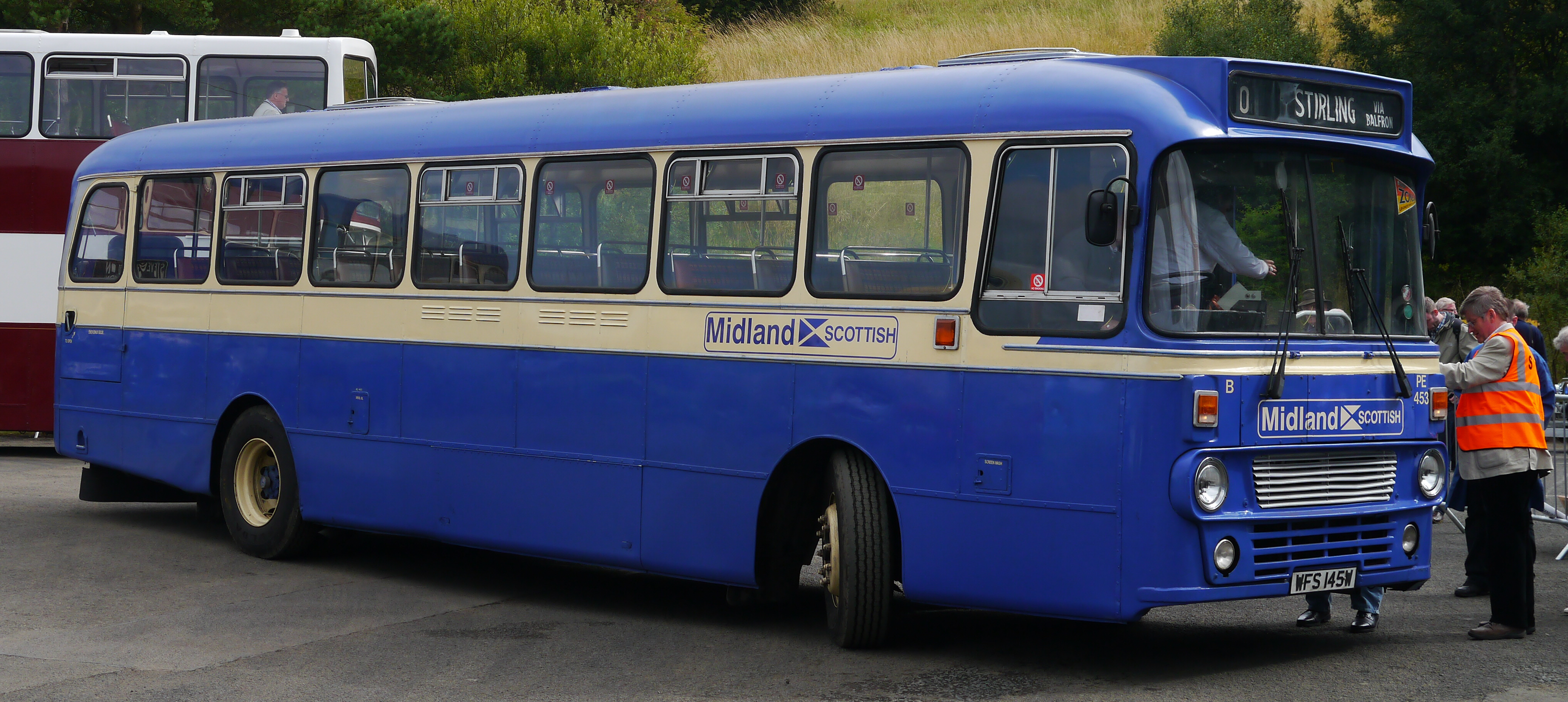
Preserved Midland Scottish Alexander Y-type bodied Leyland Leopard at the Scottish Vintage Bus Museum in 2013

Midland Scottish Omnibuses Ltd was a bus operator formed in June 1985 as a subsidiary of the Scottish Bus Group, created from part of W. Alexander & Sons (Midland) Ltd. The company operated as Midland Scottish until 1991, when it was renamed Midland Bluebird in preparation for privatisation.

From its head office in Camelon (later Larbert), Midland Scottish was the largest bus operator in Stirling, Clackmannanshire and Falkirk districts and was responsible for urban, rural and interurban services in and around Stirling, the Trossachs, Alloa, Falkirk, and Linlithgow, as well as parts of Argyllshire. Services from these places extended into Glasgow, Edinburgh and Perth. The company also provided coaches for Scottish Citylink express work, mainly north west and central Scotland to other towns and cities in Scotland and England.

== History ==
Midland Scottish's predecessor company, W Alexander & Sons can be traced back to 1923, being split into three smaller companies in 1961. The largest of these, Midland, subsequently renamed Midland Scottish, had an operating territory extended from Glasgow and Bo'ness in the south to Oban and Pitlochry in the north. In 1970 the Oban depot and services had been transferred to Highland Omnibuses, but the operating area was still large and varied.

In preparation for deregulation of the bus industry and eventual privatisation, the Scottish Bus Group reorganised its subsidiaries in 1985 to create smaller operating units which more closely corresponded with local government boundaries and which reduced the number of jointly-operated services. The Alexander (Midland) depots at within Strathclyde were ceded to a new company named Kelvin Scottish, whilst those in Tayside passed to another new company named Strathtay Scottish. The company's central works in Falkirk adjacent to Larbert depot also passed to another new SBG subsidiary, SBG Engineering.

The remainder of Alexander (Midland) was renamed Midland Scottish Omnibuses, and consisted of the Central Region depots at Alloa, Balfron, Bannockburn, Callander, Grangemouth and Larbert. Midland Scottish also were transferred the former Scottish Omnibuses depot at Linlithgow in West Lothian, giving Midland Scottish full responsibility for jointly operated Edinburgh to Stirling and Falkirk services, alongside the SBG's Highland Scottish Argyllshire operations from Oban depot and Western SMT depots Ardrishaig and Bridgend, Islay. The traditional Alexander's azure blue and ivory livery was retained for the Midland Scottish fleet, and some coaches and dual-purpose vehicles continued to wear the bluebird logo that had long been used by Alexander's coaching operations. The Bluebird name was also revived as a marketing name for express services into Glasgow and Edinburgh and for the coach fleet.

Compared to some other SBG subsidiaries, Midland Scottish's operations continued largely unchanged by deregulation. The company did not compete against city operators in Glasgow or Edinburgh which were on the outer extremities of its territory, and within the core Stirling and Falkirk area it faced only light competition from small independent firms. As a result, Midland was one of the most successful of the Scottish Bus Group subsidiaries, being the second most profitable after Fife Scottish.

The Argyllshire operations were detached from the rest of the company but had been given to Midland Scottish in 1985 as it was the closest subsidiary with a partially rural operating area. They were considered too small to become a separate company in their own right, too far from Inverness to be managed by Highland Scottish, and too dissimilar to Kelvin Scottish's largely urban network around Glasgow. Nevertheless they were peripheral to Midland's operations and the company soon began to divest itself of them. The Islay operations were surrendered to a local independent, whilst the Ardrishaig depot was sold to West Coast Motors of Campbeltown in 1987.

In 1988, SBG Engineering closed the Larbert works and Midland Scottish took it over as their head office. In 1990, as the company prepared for privatisation, it began trading as Midland Bluebird. It became the second SBG subsidiary to be privatised when it was sold for £8.5 million (equivalent to £21,020,000 in 2025) in September 1990 to the GRT Group. Shortly afterward, the company changed its legal name to Midland Bluebird, with buses receiving a livery in the style of other GRT Group companies.

Midland Bluebird's Oban depot was sold to Oban & District in 1992, completing the withdrawal from Argyllshire, and in September 1992, the company announced a smoking ban on all its services from 12 October after a highly publicised public consultation found that 91% of respondents wished smoking to be banned on its services.

The former operations of Midland Scottish are today part of McGill's Scotland East.
