= W. Alexander & Sons =

Former bus operator and coachbuilder

W. Alexander & Sons Ltd
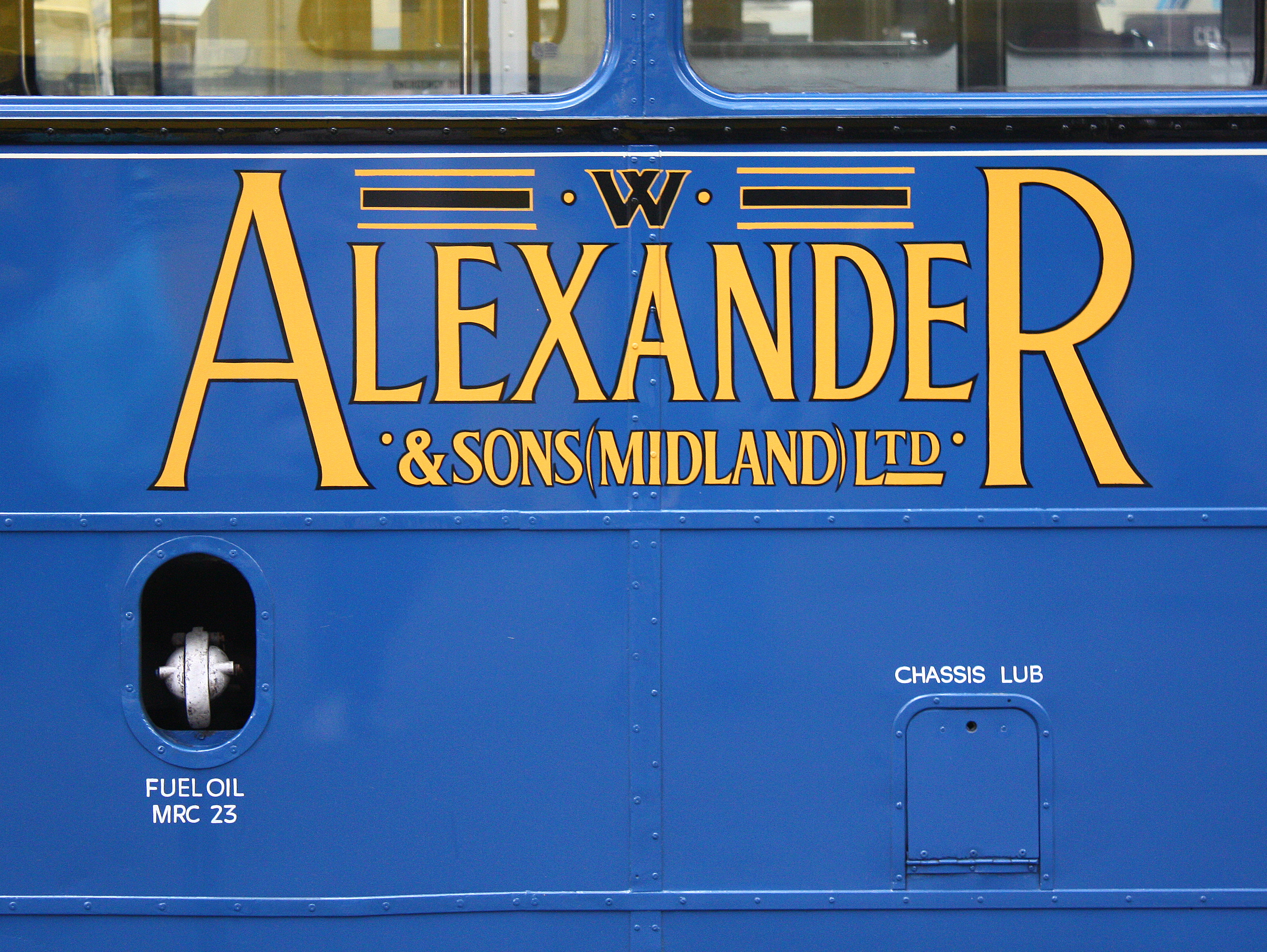
- Regional version of the W. Alexander & Sons livery
- Formerly: Alexanders' Motor Services
- Fate: Split up in 1947 with spin-off of Walter Alexander Coachbuilders, split up again in 1961 into multiple companies
- Services: Bus manufacturing and operations in Scotland
- Parent: Alexander Dennis

W. Alexander & Sons Ltd was a bus operator and coachbuilder in Scotland. The company grew from small beginnings to become the largest bus operator in Scotland, and one of the largest in the U.K., by the time it was split up in 1961. Its coachbuilding activities, which were transferred to a separate company in 1947, still survive as part of Alexander Dennis.

== History ==
=== Early years ===
Alexanders' Motor Services began running 'omnibus' services in the Falkirk area from a base in Camelon in 1913, and by 1924 the company was registered as W. Alexander & Sons Ltd. It was run by father and son, Walter Alexander (1879–1959) and Walter Alexander (1902–1979).

From 1929 the company was controlled by the Scottish Motor Traction Company (SMT), which had itself come under control of the LMS and LNE Railway companies the previous year. Expansion was rapid, partly achieved by acquisition. An early gain was the Scottish General Omnibus Group, which, through a northern subsidiary, took the growing Alexanders empire as far away as Aberdeen and Inverness by 1930. The company acquired Bydand Motor Omnibus Company of Aberdeen in 1932. In 1934 another notable achievement was an agreement with Perth Corporation to run city bus services on their behalf. Some acquired companies were initially operated as subsidiaries rather than being immediately absorbed by Alexander, notably General Motor Carrying Co. Ltd. of Kirkcaldy (1930–37), Simpson's and Forrester's Ltd. of Dunfermline (1929–38), Pitlochry Motor Services Ltd. of Pitlochry (1929–42) and David Lawson Ltd. of Kirkintilloch (1936–61).

In addition to running services, Alexanders had also been building bus bodies since 1924, initially for their own use and then for their subsidiary operators and other members of the SMT group. However, when the bus and coach operations of the SMT group were about to be nationalised following the new Labour Government's Transport Act 1947, it became necessary to move the coachbuilding to a separate company, Walter Alexander & Co. (Coachbuilders) Ltd, in order to keep it in private hands.

=== Post-nationalisation ===
Nationalisation of the railway companies in 1948 made the British Transport Commission majority owner of the SMT group, and complete nationalisation took place in 1949. Some minor restructuring of the companies then took place, with the SMT parent company's detached operations in the Dundee area being transferred to Alexander later that year. In 1952 Highland Omnibuses Ltd. was formed by the merger of the group's Inverness-based subsidiaries Highland Transport and MacRae & Dick, and Alexander's Inverness operations were also transferred to the new company.

==== Geographical split ====
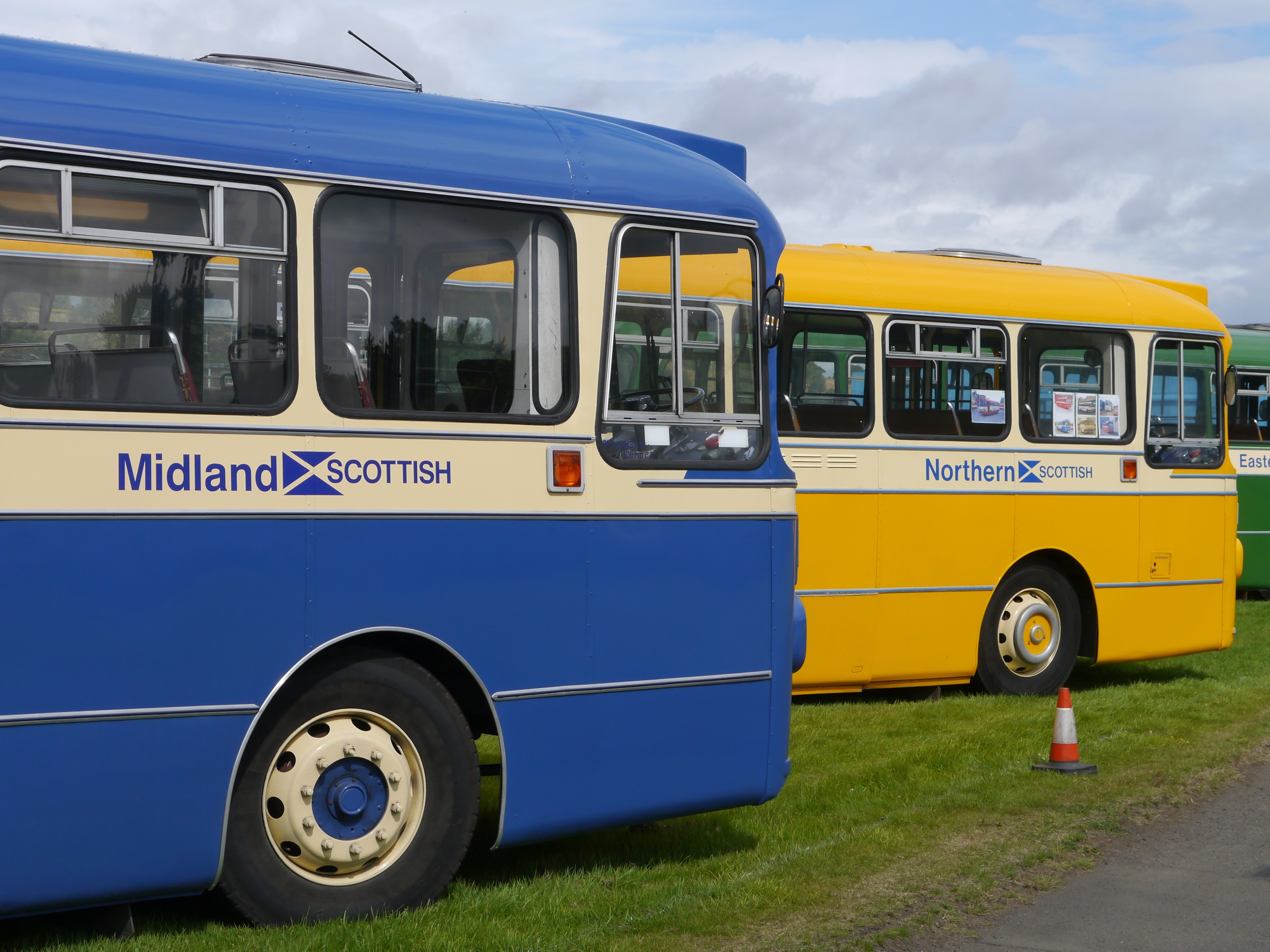
Preserved/restored examples of buses in blue "Midland Scottish" and yellow "Northern Scottish" livery.

The geographical extent of the company's services was huge, extending from Glasgow and Oban in the south west to Aberdeen and Forres in the north-east, so for management purposes there where three operating areas - Fife (within the county of Fife, which prior to the construction of the Forth and Tay road bridges had a relatively self-contained bus network), Southern (south and west of Perth) and Northern (Dundee and the north east). In 1961 the operating company was split into three smaller units corresponding with these areas, W. Alexander & Sons (Fife) Ltd. based in Kirkcaldy, W. Alexander & Sons (Midland) Ltd. based in Falkirk and W. Alexander & Sons (Northern) Ltd. based in Aberdeen. Alexander (Midland) also absorbed the David Lawson subsidiary at this time. The old company's buses had used a blue livery, apart from Perth City and Kirkcaldy Town buses and the David Lawson subsidiary, which fleets were usually painted dark red. Soon after the split, however, the Fife and Northern companies adopted bright red and yellow liveries respectively, while the Midland company retained the original shade of blue. The Alexander fleetname was not used on vehicles thereafter, although the bluebird logo used on Alexander's coach fleet continued to be used by all three successor companies.

==== 1978 rebranding ====
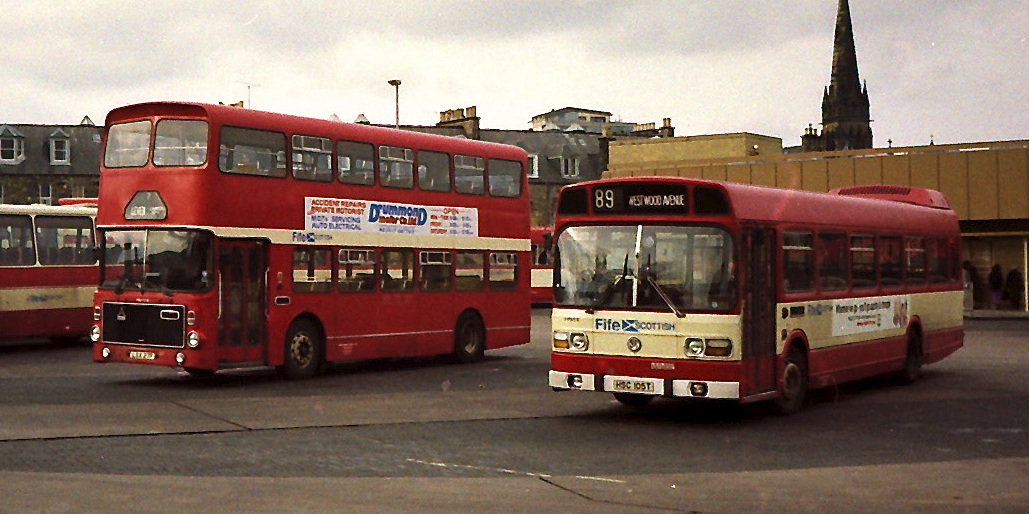
Red "Fife Scottish"-branded buses operated by W. Alexander & Sons (Fife) Ltd. in March 1985, shortly before the company itself adopted the name as part of the reorganisation.

As part of a rebranding exercise within the Scottish Transport Group in 1978, fleet names Fife Scottish, Midland Scottish and Northern Scottish were adopted. In preparation for deregulation of bus services, a further reorganisation of the Scottish Bus Group occurred in 1985 in which boundaries were realigned again and the three companies became five: Fife Scottish Omnibuses Ltd., Kelvin Scottish Omnibuses Ltd., Midland Scottish Omnibuses Ltd., Northern Scottish Omnibuses Ltd. and Strathtay Scottish Omnibuses Ltd.

== Gallery ==
W. Alexander & Sons Ltd buses and livery
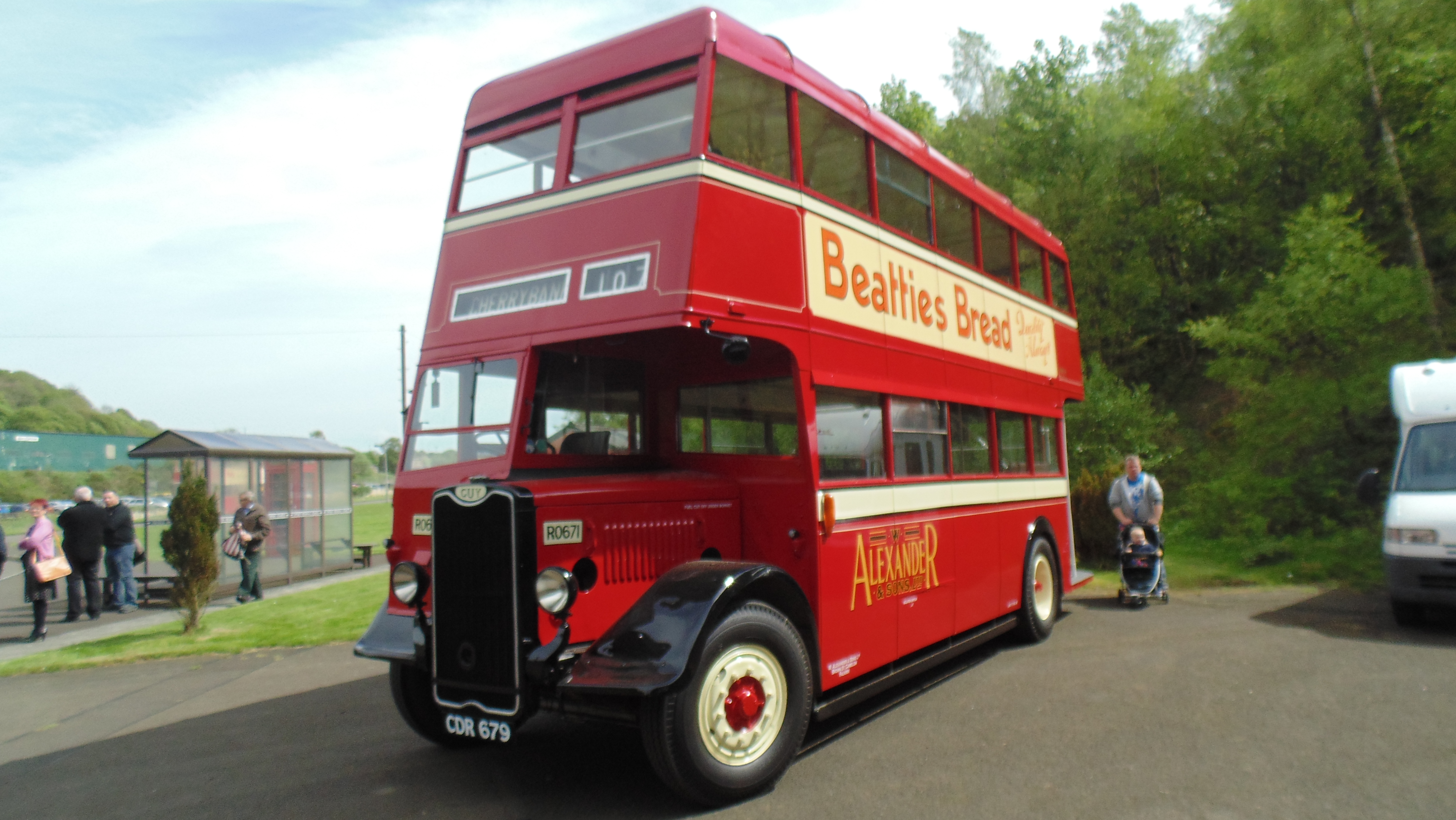
W. Alexander & Sons bus R0671 (CDR 679), 2014

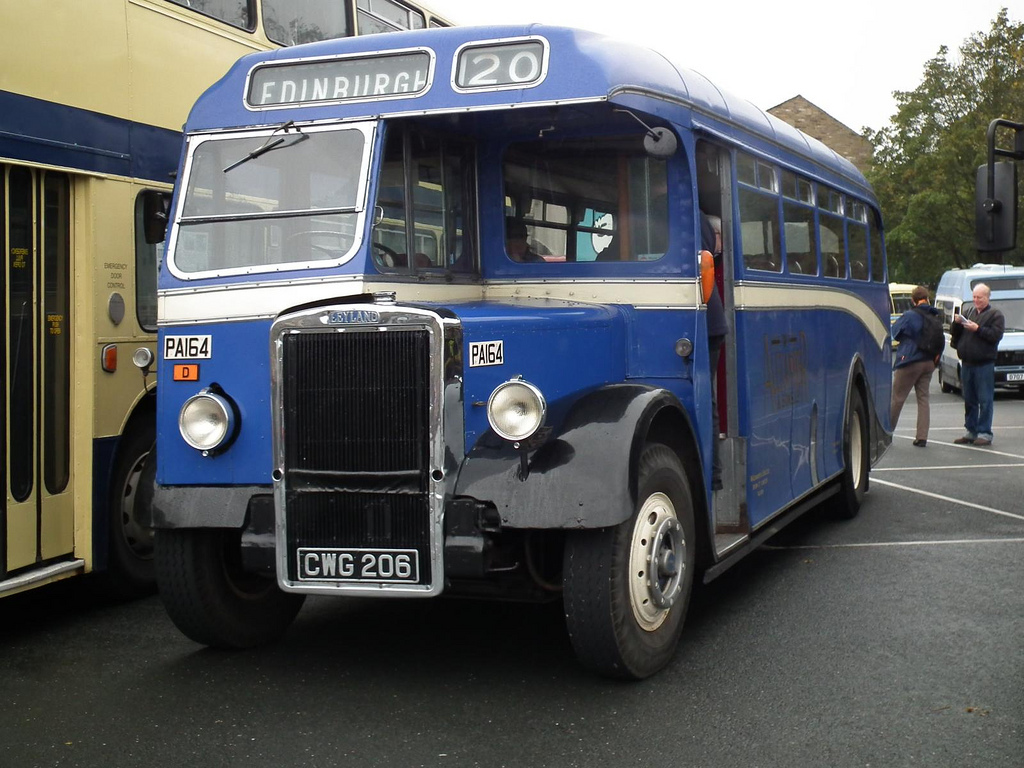
A preserved W. Alexander & Sons Leyland Tiger bus with Alexander bodywork

== Sources ==
- Brown, S.J. (1984), Alexander's Buses, Fleetline Books. ISBN 0946033013.
- Condie, A.T. (1996), Alexanders Buses Remembered - Volume 1 1945-1961, Allan T. Condie Publications. ISBN 1856380149.
- Condie, A.T. (1997), Alexanders Buses Remembered - Volume 2 1961-1985, Allan T. Condie Publications. ISBN 1856380173.
- Hibbs, J. (1968). The History of British Bus Services, David & Charles, Newton Abbott. ISBN 0715342215.
- McCallum, F. & Bloomfield, S.W. (1965), British Bus Fleets No.22: Scottish Bus Group, Ian Allan, London.
- P.S.V. Circle (1995), W. Alexander & Sons Ltd; Part One 1914 to 1931 (fleet history PM14), P.S.V. Circle, Harrow.
