= Stagecoach Highlands =

Bus operator in the Scottish Highlands

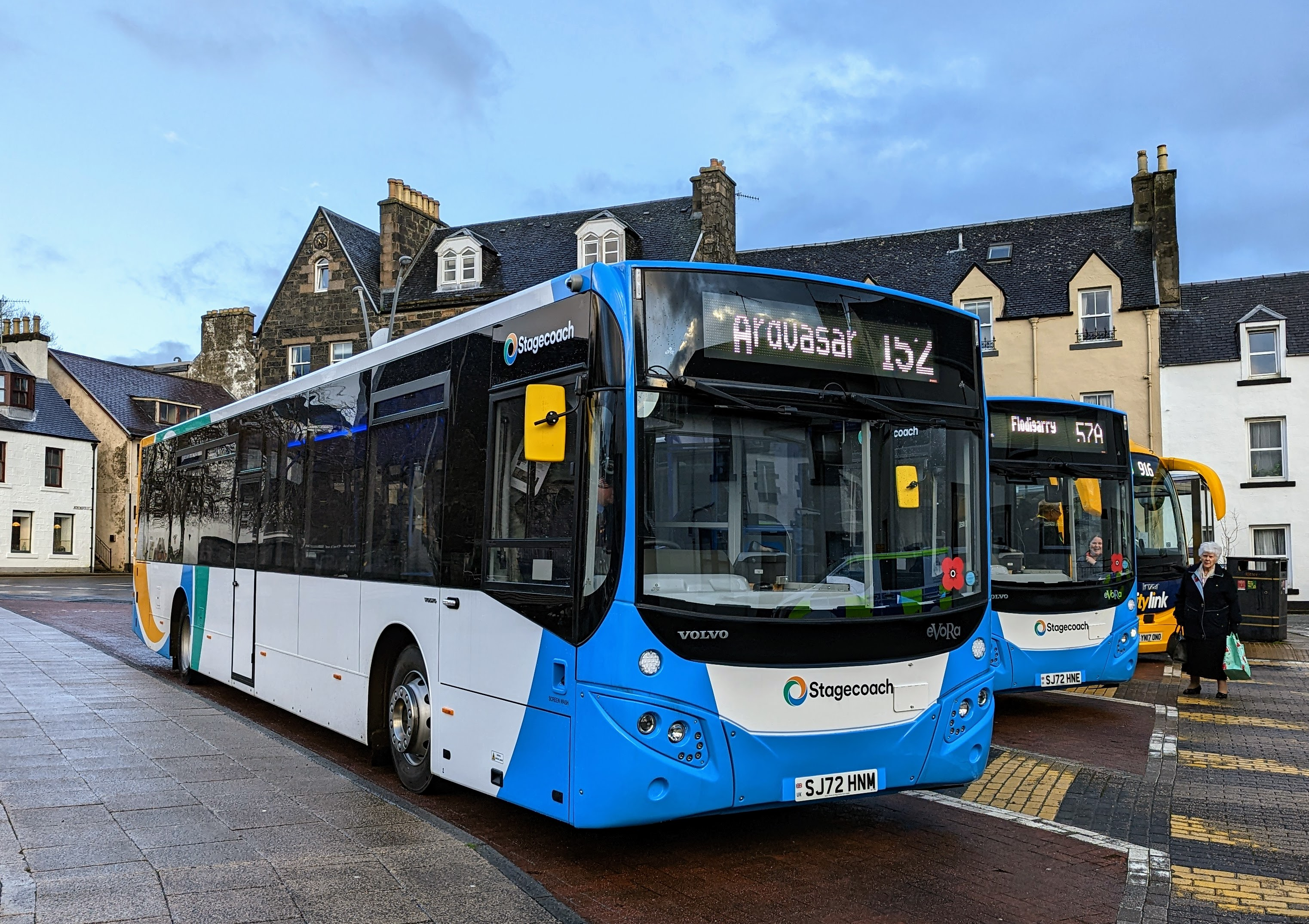
- MCV Evora bodied Volvo B8RLE at Portree bus station in November 2022
- Parent: Stagecoach Group
- Founded: June 2008; 18 years ago
- Headquarters: Inverness, Scotland, UK
- Service area: Scottish Highlands, Inverness, Orkney
- Service type: Bus and coach
- Hubs: Inverness, Thurso, Kirkwall, Portree, Fort William
- Fuel type: Diesel and electric
- Website: Official Website

Stagecoach Highlands is a bus operator based in Inverness that runs services in the Scottish Highlands as well as on the Orkney Islands and Isle of Skye. It is a subsidiary of the Stagecoach Group formed in 2008 following the purchase of the independent Rapsons Group, and is today part of the Stagecoach North Scotland group of companies.

== History ==
=== Rapsons Group ===
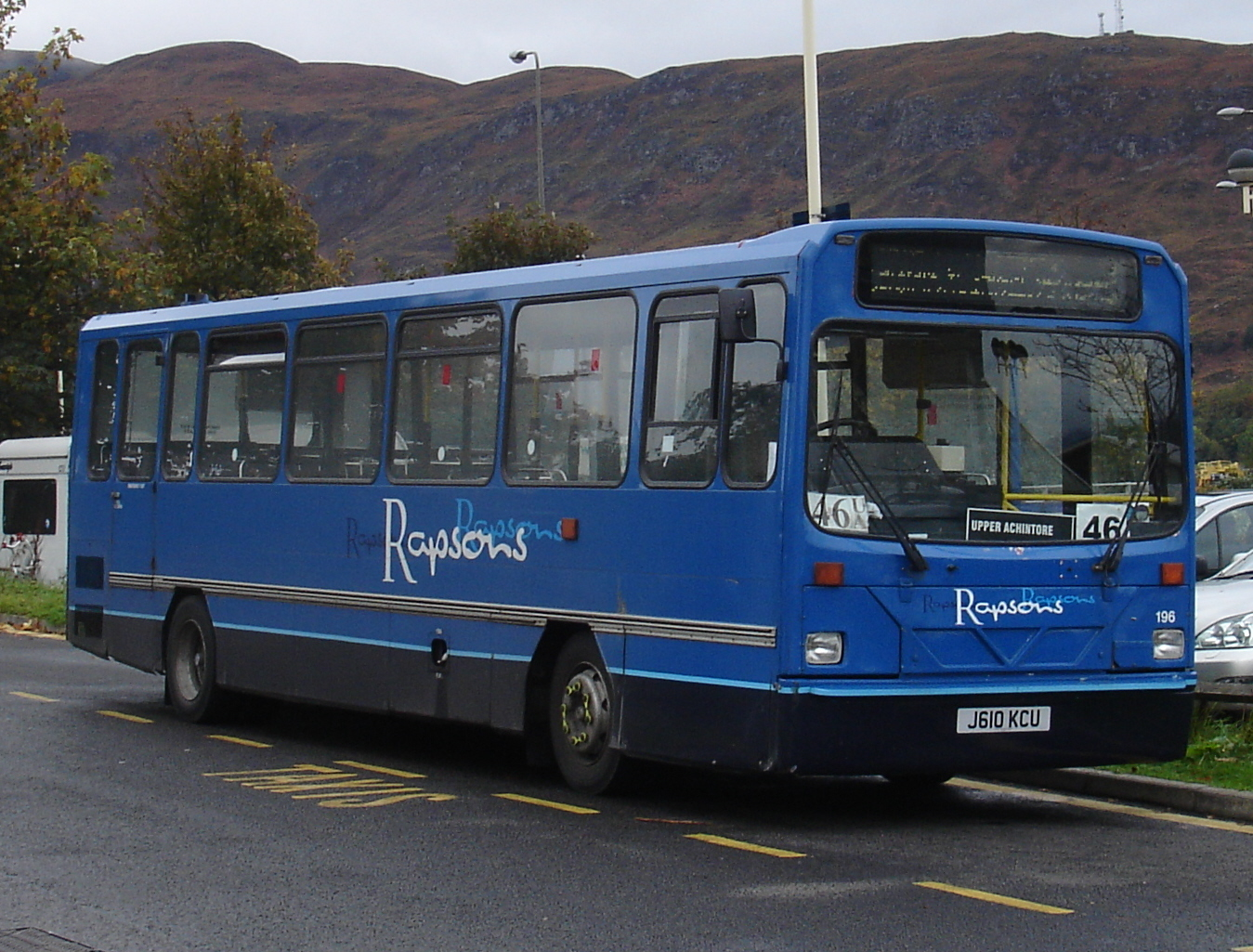
Rapsons Wright Handybus in Fort William in 2006

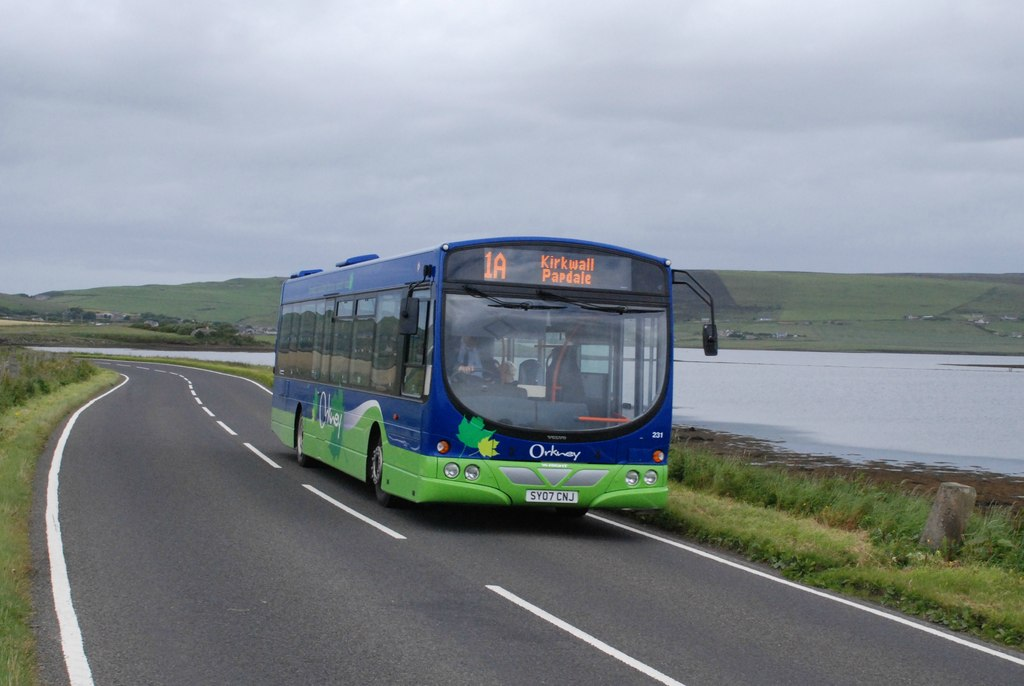
Orkney Coaches Wright Eclipse Urban passing Cursiter Farm on the A965 in June 2008

The Rapsons Group was Scotland's largest independent operator, formed as a group of companies serving the Highlands & Islands and based from its headquarters at Seafield Road, Inverness. The company traded as Rapsons Coaches, Highland Country Buses, Orkney & Causeway Coaches and also operated on long-distance Scottish Citylink and National Express contracts. Rapsons operated over 250 vehicles with around 400 employees based at depots in Inverness, Aviemore, Fort William, Portree, Wick, Thurso & Kirkwall. While regular bus services traded as Highland Country, longer distance, express and private contract work operated under the Rapsons name.

Rapsons were founded in 1945 but came further into business between the 1970s to 1980s. In August 1991, Highland Scottish was sold to a consortium made up of Rapsons Coaches and Clansman Travel and Leisure, the holding company for Scottish Citylink, which had recently been purchased from the Scottish Bus Group through a management and employee buyout, for £800,000. In March 1993, ownership of Highland Scottish passed wholly to Rapsons.

Prior to Highland Scottish's sale, the company initially maintained a monopoly over bus services in Inverness, operating minibuses in competition with Inverness Traction, a company formed by former Highland employees in 1988. Inverness Traction entered receivership in April 1989, but were subsequently purchased by Alexander (North East), who too collapsed in November 1989 due to unpaid debts. The assets and services of Inverness Traction were purchased by Stagecoach Holdings, who by 1991, were engaged in a bus war with Highland that saw a large number of Highland drivers defect to Stagecoach after they received a pay cut. Highland soon scaled down the level of its competition against Stagecoach, and soon after, Stagecoach purchased the Inverness and Tain operations of Highland Scottish, becoming the dominant operator of Inverness area bus services.

In October 1995, Highland Scottish was split in two, with Rapsons retaining the eastern services under Highland Bus & Coach Ltd while the remainder passed to a new company, Highland Country Buses Ltd, which was bought by National Express for £1.8 million. The two companies continued to exist under separate ownership until August 1998, when Rapsons bought Highland Country Buses back from National Express for £4 million.

In 1999, Rapsons began to expand into the Orkney Islands with the acquisition of four separate bus companies, including the two largest, James D. Peace and Shalder Coaches. The acquisition of Shalder Coaches also allowed Rapsons to expand into Shetland, with the company trading as Shetland Coaches from a depot at Lower Scord, Scalloway. Rapsons pulled out of Shetland in 2003 after they lost all service contracts when going for an increase in rates, while Rapsons' Orkney operations were rebranded Orkney Coaches in April 2005, with Orkney Coaches operated as a separate subsidiary of Highland Country.

In March 2006, Rapsons gave up most of their long-distance coach contracts with Scottish Citylink and National Express. Later in November, around 200 Rapsons workers affiliated with the Transport and General Workers' Union planned a series of 24-hour strikes in a pay dispute, with union officials wanting driver's pay equal to their Stagecoach competitors at £8 an hour. The strikes were prevented when workers were offered and later accepted an improved pay offer from Rapsons' management.

=== Stagecoach ownership ===
On 16 May 2008, it was announced that the Stagecoach Group were to purchase the Rapsons Group, including Highland Country Buses and Orkney Coaches Ltd, consolidating the group's position in the north of Scotland. The sale was completed in June 2008, adding over 200 buses to the Stagecoach fleet.

In April 2011 the operations at Inverness & Easter Ross were transferred to the Highland Country operating licence from the Bluebird Buses licence. In late 2011, the depot at Burnett Road closed, with the company now operating from the former Rapsons Inverness depot at Seafield Road, Inverness, which was reopened by Stagecoach.

In April 2018, Stagecoach Highlands announced it was closing its Fort William depot in Caol, which housed eight buses and employed 16 members of staff; the depot was subsequently purchased by local independent operator Shiel Buses in July.

In October 2026, it was announced that Highland Council's D&E Coaches operation had acquired Stagecoach Highlands' Thurso and Wick depots, with all 26 of the depots' drivers and engineers to move to D&E Coaches in a TUPE transfer on 19 October.

== Operations ==
=== Inverness ===
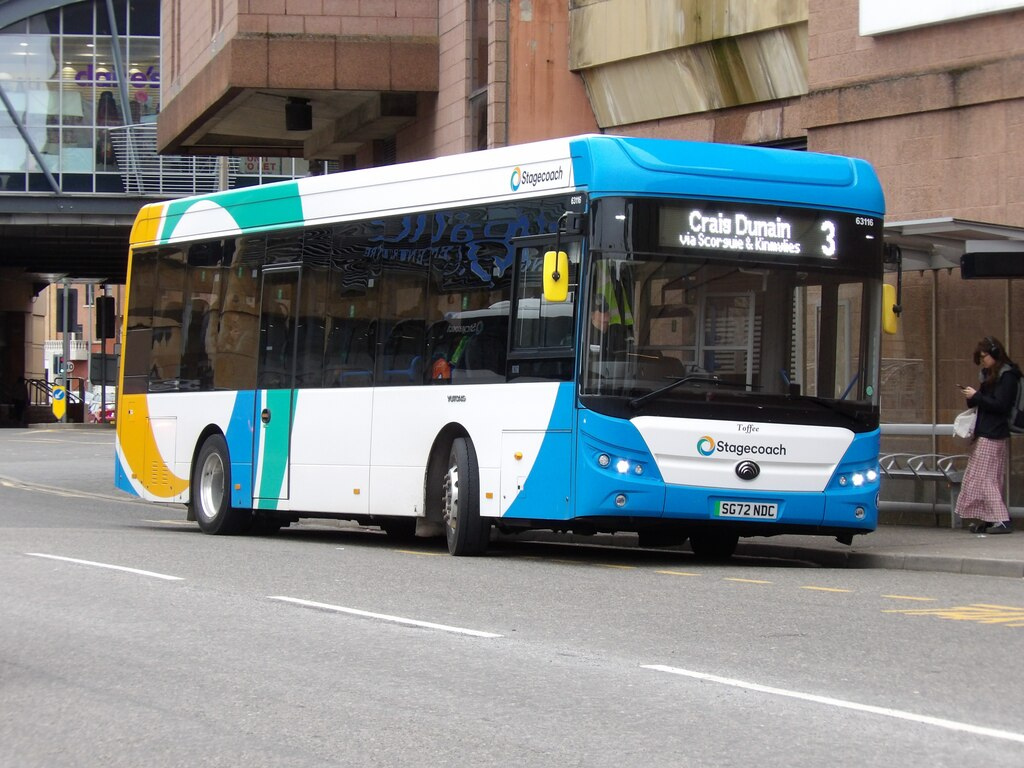
Yutong E10 battery electric bus in Inverness in April 2026

A majority of Stagecoach Highlands buses operate in or around the city of Inverness, where the company operates the 'Inverness City Network'. Stagecoach has operated a number of battery electric buses on this network; six 'Inverness ElectriCity'-branded electric Optare Solo SRs entered service in June 2015, later followed by 25 Yutong E10s which began entering service around the city from early 2023.

In August 2022, Stagecoach Highlands and the Highlands and Islands Strategic Transport Partnership (HiTrans) launched a pilot autonomous bus service connecting the Inverness Campus with a nearby retail & business park, running in parallel to a similar trial conducted in Hannover, Germany. The bus, manufactured by Navya SAS, carries 15 passengers, including four standees, and operated in Inverness until March 2023.

Stagecoach in Inverness formerly ran the 'JET' service from Inverness Airport to Inverness city centre, Ardersier, Nairn, Forres and Elgin, launched in 2007 by Rapsons with the support of HiTrans. The route won the award for Scotland's Best Bus Service in 2010, however, the 'JET' branding was replaced with the arrival of eight Alexander Dennis Enviro200 MMCs in regular Stagecoach livery for the Inverness Airport corridor in September 2018.

=== Orkney Islands ===
Stagecoach operates local and some school bus services on the Mainland island of the Orkney Islands on contract to the Orkney Islands Council, with services operating from a single depot in Kirkwall. Between October 2021 and January 2022, the Orkney operation received 25 MCV Evora-bodied Volvo B8RLEs and nine Optare Solo SRs.

=== Isle of Skye ===
Stagecoach is the primary bus operator on the Isle of Skye, operating buses out of a single depot in Portree. The Skye operation also took delivery of MCV Evoras, with eleven being delivered in November 2022 for use on both local and school services in the area.

== See also ==
- Highland Scottish
