= Broxden Junction =

Road junction near Perth, Scotland

Broxden Roundabout
- Interactive map of Broxden Roundabout

Location
- Perth, Scotland
- Coordinates: 56°23′17″N 3°29′14″W
- Roads at junction: M90; A9; A93

Construction
- Type: Roundabout
- Maintained by: Transport Scotland

Location in Perth and Kinross
Location in UK motorway network

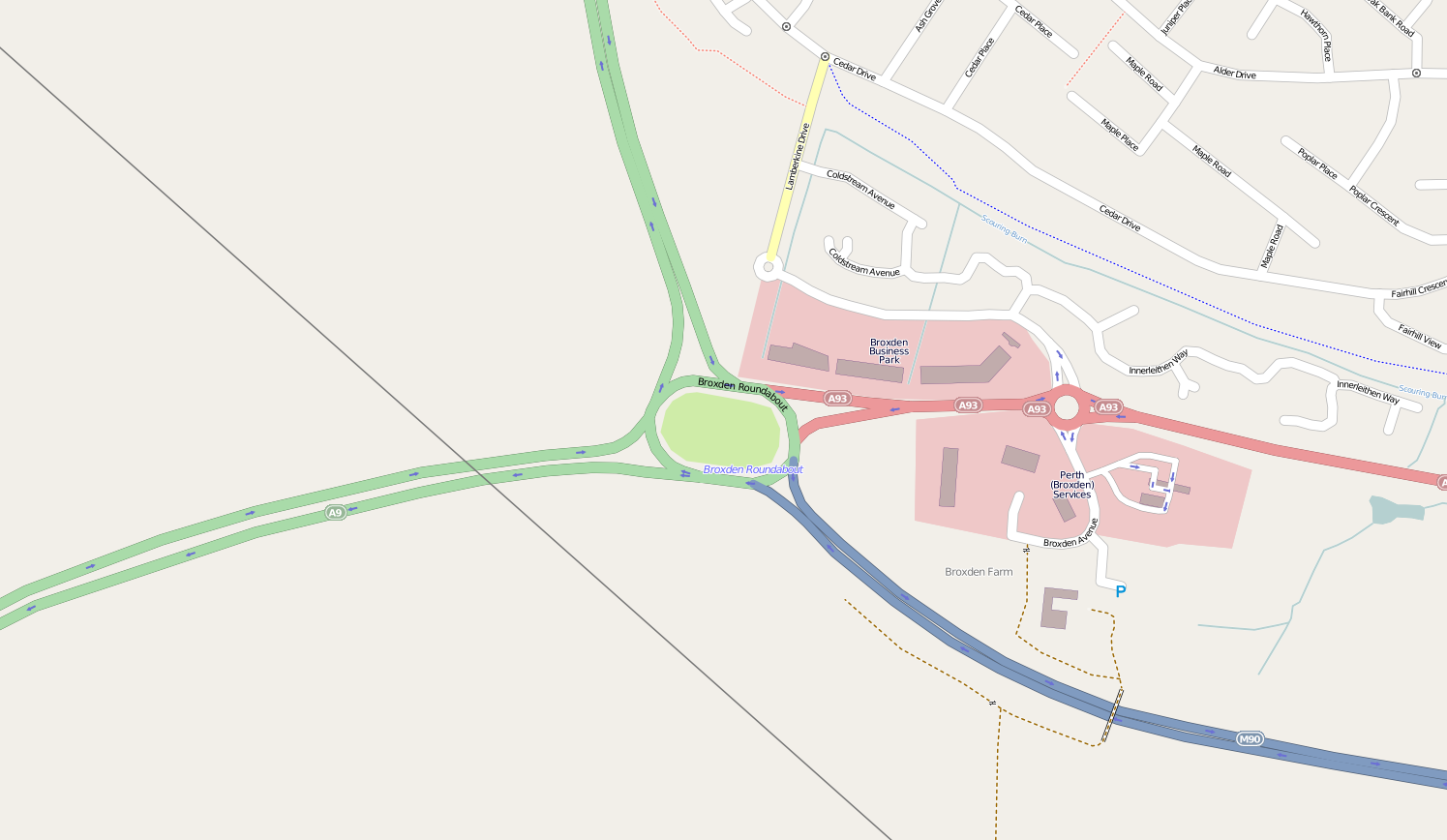
Diagram of Broxden Junction

Broxden Junction (also known as Broxden Roundabout or Broxden Interchange) is one of the busier and more important road junctions in Scotland. It is located on the outskirts of Perth, and is one of the city's two major roundabouts – the other being Inveralmond Roundabout, where the A9 meets the A912 Dunkeld Road, 2.3 miles (3.7 km) to the north-northwest. The roundabout, oval in shape, is an important hub of the Scottish road network, a major junction on the A9 north–south route, and the UK's northernmost motorway junction, being junction 12 of the M90 motorway. Prior to Dunfermline's ascension to city status, all of the seven cities in Scotland were signposted from its exits.

Broxden is an interchange for several local bus and long-distance coach services, the latter provided by Scottish Citylink, Megabus, FlixBus, and Ember. There is a park and ride area with a local bus service to Perth city centre.

The roundabout was originally designed with the future intention of connecting the northbound A9 and the M90, with the roundabout being replaced by a grade separated junction, and in 2008 Transport Scotland published proposals for the dualling of the A9 between Dunblane and Inverness including the replacement of Broxden Junction with a flyover.

It is arguably the largest roundabout in Scotland, with a length of 161.1 meters.

== Exits and principal destinations (cities in bold) ==
North West

- **Inverness** and the North (A9), Crieff, Crianlarich and Oban (A85), Loch Lomond and the North West (A82)

North East

- **Perth**, Braemar and Deeside (A93)

South East

- **Aberdeen**, **Dundee** and the North East (M90/A90)
- **Edinburgh** and Fife (M90 spur)

South West

- **Stirling**, **Glasgow** (A9/M9, M80) and the South (M73, M74)
