= Stagecoach Bluebird =

Scottish bus operating company

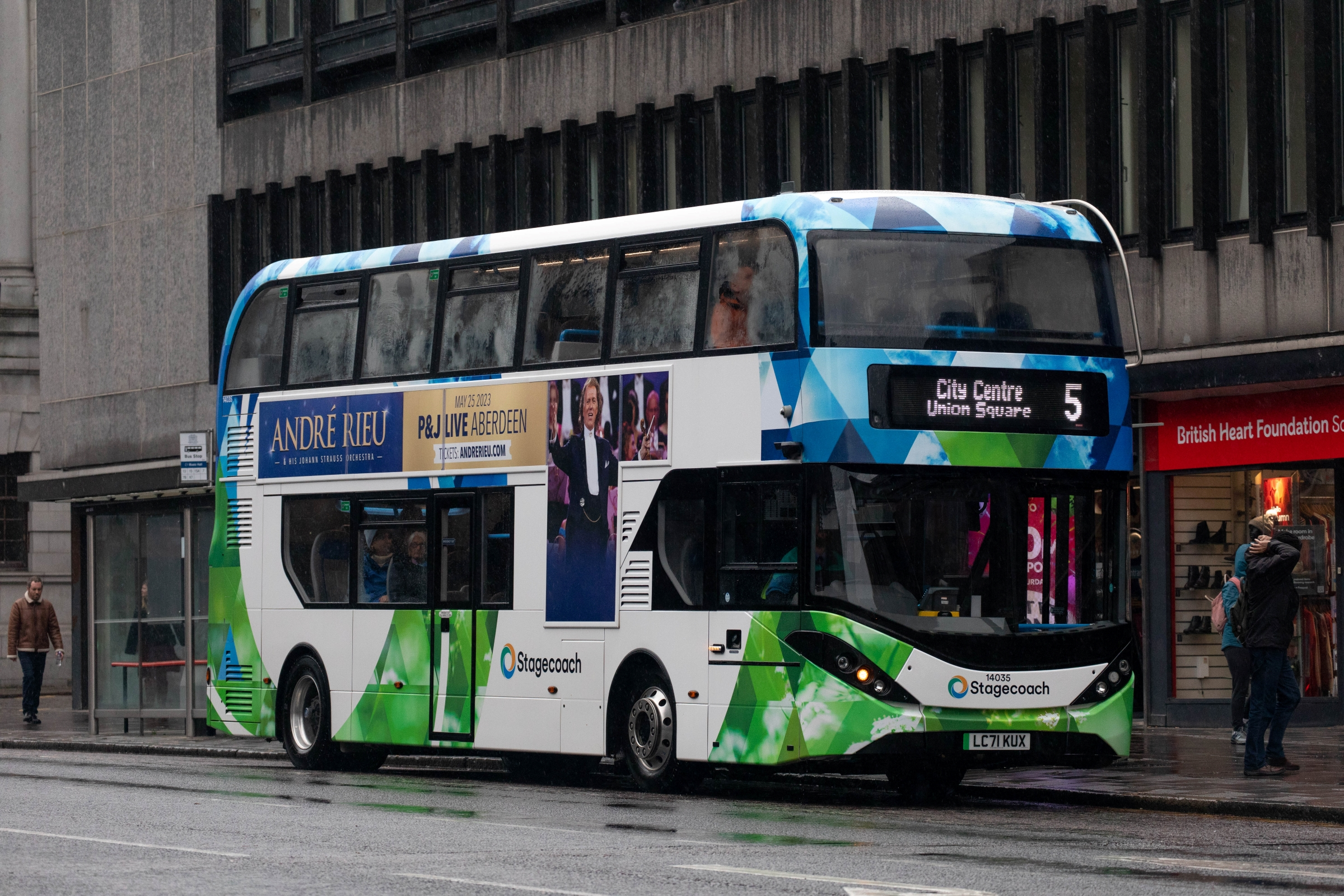
- Stagecoach Bluebird Alexander Dennis Enviro400EV on Union Street, Aberdeen, in September 2022
- Parent: Stagecoach Group
- Founded: 1985 (as Northern Scottish); 1992 (as Bluebird Buses)
- Headquarters: Aberdeen
- Locale: Aberdeen, Aberdeenshire, and Moray
- Website: Stagecoach Bluebird

Stagecoach Bluebird (also known by its legal operating name Bluebird Buses Ltd, and formerly Northern Scottish Omnibuses Ltd) is a Scottish bus company which operates bus services in the areas of Aberdeen, Aberdeenshire and Moray. It is a subsidiary of the Stagecoach Group.

The company has held two royal warrants, with the first granted by Elizabeth II for bus and coach services in 1996, expiring with her death in 2022, and the second granted by Charles III in 2025.

== History ==
=== Northern Scottish ===
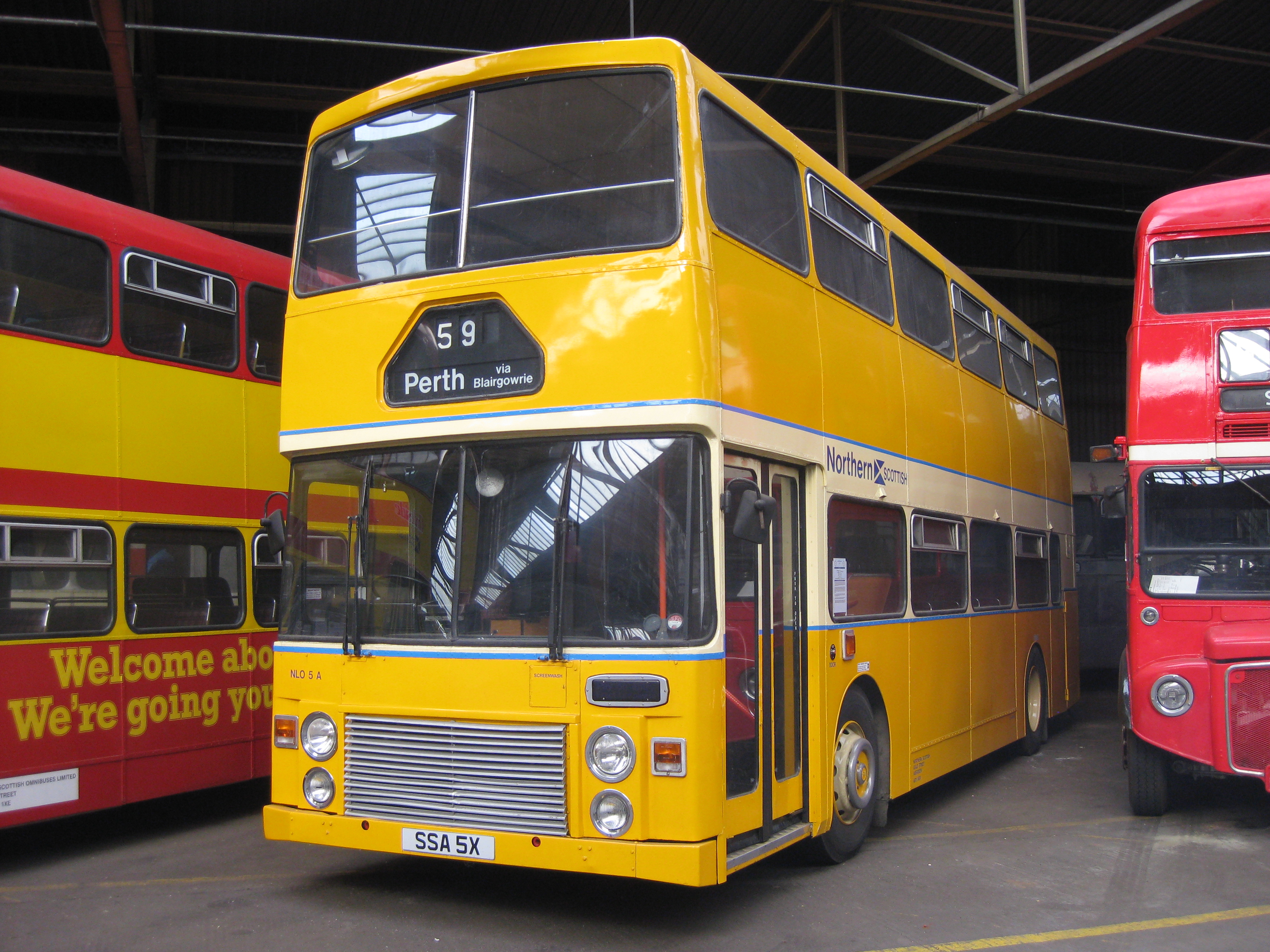
Preserved SBG Northern Scottish Alexander bodied Leyland Olympian at Bridgeton Bus Museum, Glasgow

The company was formed as Northern Scottish Omnibuses Ltd in June 1985 from the northern operations of W. Alexander & Sons (Northern) Ltd. (which had already traded as "Northern Scottish" since 1978 and was then a member of the Scottish Bus Group). The southern operations in Blairgowrie, Arbroath, Montrose, Forfar and Dundee were ceded to a new company, Strathtay Scottish. From its creation, the company retained the traditional yellow and cream livery from its SBG predecessor.

On the approach to deregulation of the British bus industry in 1986, Northern had a working relationship with Aberdeen city operator Grampian Regional Transport, and operated some services together under the Grampian Scottish name. However, the co-operation would be short lived, and upon deregulation Northern Scottish launched a network of services throughout Aberdeen under the CityBus brand and adopting dual-door double deckers, non-standard for Northern but common with Grampian. In response, Grampian would extend its operations outwith Aberdeen and into Northern's rural operating base, and in 1990, planned an ultimately unsuccessful bid to buy out Northern.

Outside Aberdeen, Northern saw little to no competition, thanks in part to its largely rural and remote territory.

Toward privatisation, the company resurrected the bluebird logo that was once used by Walter Alexander for its coaching operations. Midland Scottish, itself a fellow SBG subsidiary and once also part of the Alexander's company, had continued to use the same logo, and as it rebranded itself as Midland Bluebird, Northern Scottish began trading as Bluebird Northern. Some vehicles operated in the Elgin area were, however, branded as Moray Bluebird, whilst those operating in the Peterhead and Fraserburgh areas were branded Buchan Bluebird.

=== Stagecoach ownership ===
Though its operations remained largely the same since its formation in 1985 (and earlier) and with little competition, Northern Scottish was not one of the most profitable of the Scottish Bus Group subsidiaries, largely due to the sparse population in its large operating area. However, the company was successfully privatised, being bought by Perth-based transport group Stagecoach for £5.7m in March 1991 in their first acquisition of a former SBG company.

In 1996, Stagecoach Bluebird were granted a royal warrant from Elizabeth II for bus and coach services. Following the closure of the Deeside Railway, which provided royal trains from Balmoral Castle to Aberdeen, in 1966, Northern and its successors provided coach transport to the castle for the royal family's summer holidays. The warrant expired with the death of Elizabeth II in 2022, however a new three-year warrant was granted by Charles III in 2025.

A Stagecoach Bluebird bus driver died in hospital following an assault by a teenage passenger in Elgin bus station on 2 February 2024.

The Stagecoach Group announced in June 2024 that it had opened a review of its Bluebird operations as a result of the cost of operating the business making it increasingly unsustainable to run. Options that have been considered by the group include the potential closure of Insch and Stonehaven depots, as well as transferring fleet engineering from Elgin depot to Stagecoach Highlands' Inverness headquarters. In August 2024, following its review, the Stagecoach Highlands and Stagecoach Bluebird operations (excluding Orkney) were merged under the Bluebird Buses license. As a result, Stagecoach Highlands now only operates in Orkney.

== Operations ==
From its head office on Guild Street, Aberdeen, Stagecoach Bluebird covers an operating range stretching over Aberdeen City, Aberdeenshire and Moray.

It is the largest operator in the north east of Scotland and is responsible for urban, rural and interurban services in the towns of Alford, Ballater, Braemar, Buckie, Elgin, Forres, Fraserburgh, Fyvie, Macduff, Mintlaw, Peterhead and Stonehaven as well as city services in Aberdeen. Depots are also located in these towns.

Bluebird also provide coaches for Scottish Citylink services, mainly from Aberdeen to Perth, Dundee, Glasgow and Edinburgh.

== Fleet ==
Together with Stagecoach Highlands, as of April 2019, the combined Stagecoach North Scotland operation operates 383 buses and coaches.
