= Fife Scottish =

Scottish Bus Group operator in Fife and Tayside

Fife Scottish Omnibuses Ltd.

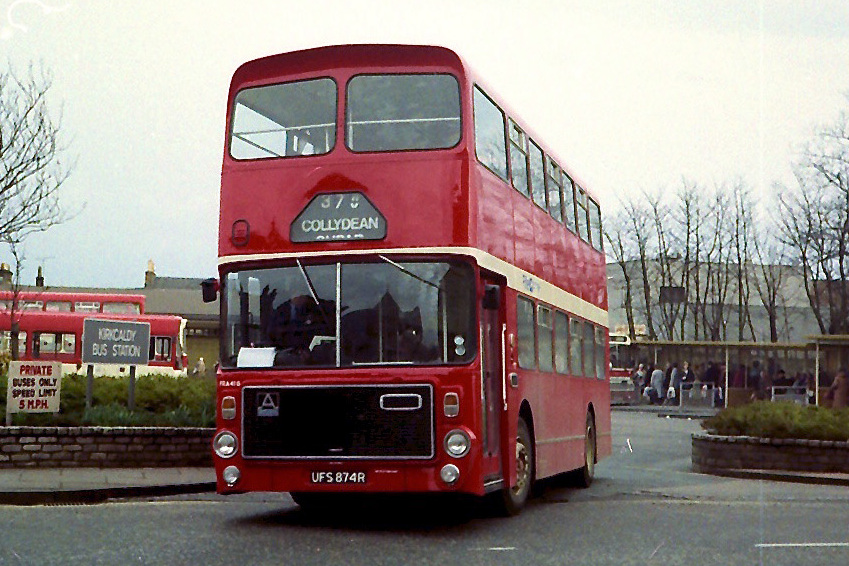
- Fife Scottish Alexander bodied Volvo Ailsa B55 in Kirkcaldy in March 1985
- Parent: Scottish Bus Group
- Founded: 1978; 48 years ago
- Defunct: July 1991; 34 years ago
- Headquarters: Kirkcaldy, Fife, Scotland
- Service area: Fife; Tayside
- Service type: Bus and coach
- Depots: 7 (February 1991)
- Fleet: 300 (February 1991)

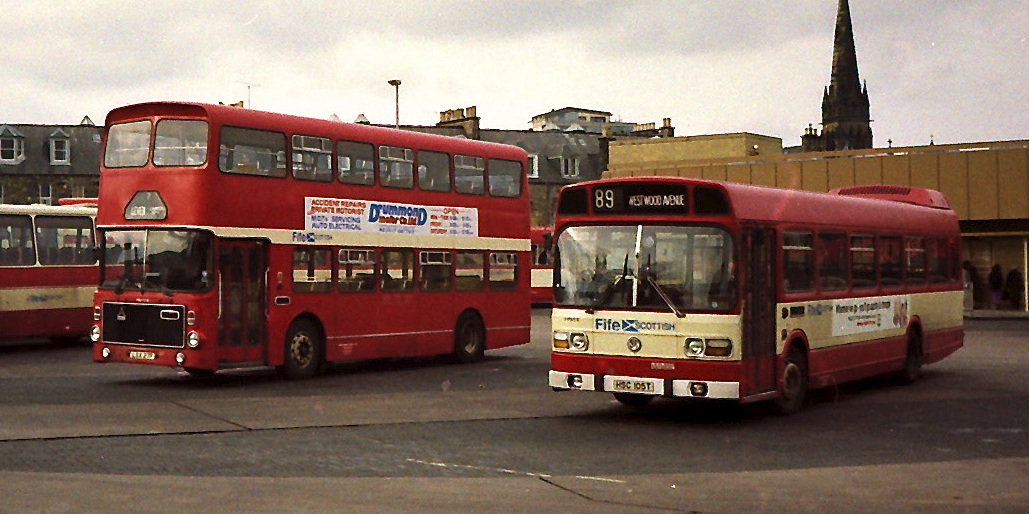
"Fife Scottish"-branded buses under Scottish Bus Group (W. Alexander & Sons (Fife) Ltd.) ownership in March 1985, shortly before the division/company itself was reorganised and rebranded to use the same name.

Fife Scottish Omnibuses Ltd was a former bus operating subsidiary of the Scottish Bus Group, formed in June 1985 from Walter Alexander & Sons (Fife) Ltd in preparation for bus deregulation and the subsequent privatisation of the Scottish Bus Group. The company today trades as part of Stagecoach South Scotland.

== History ==
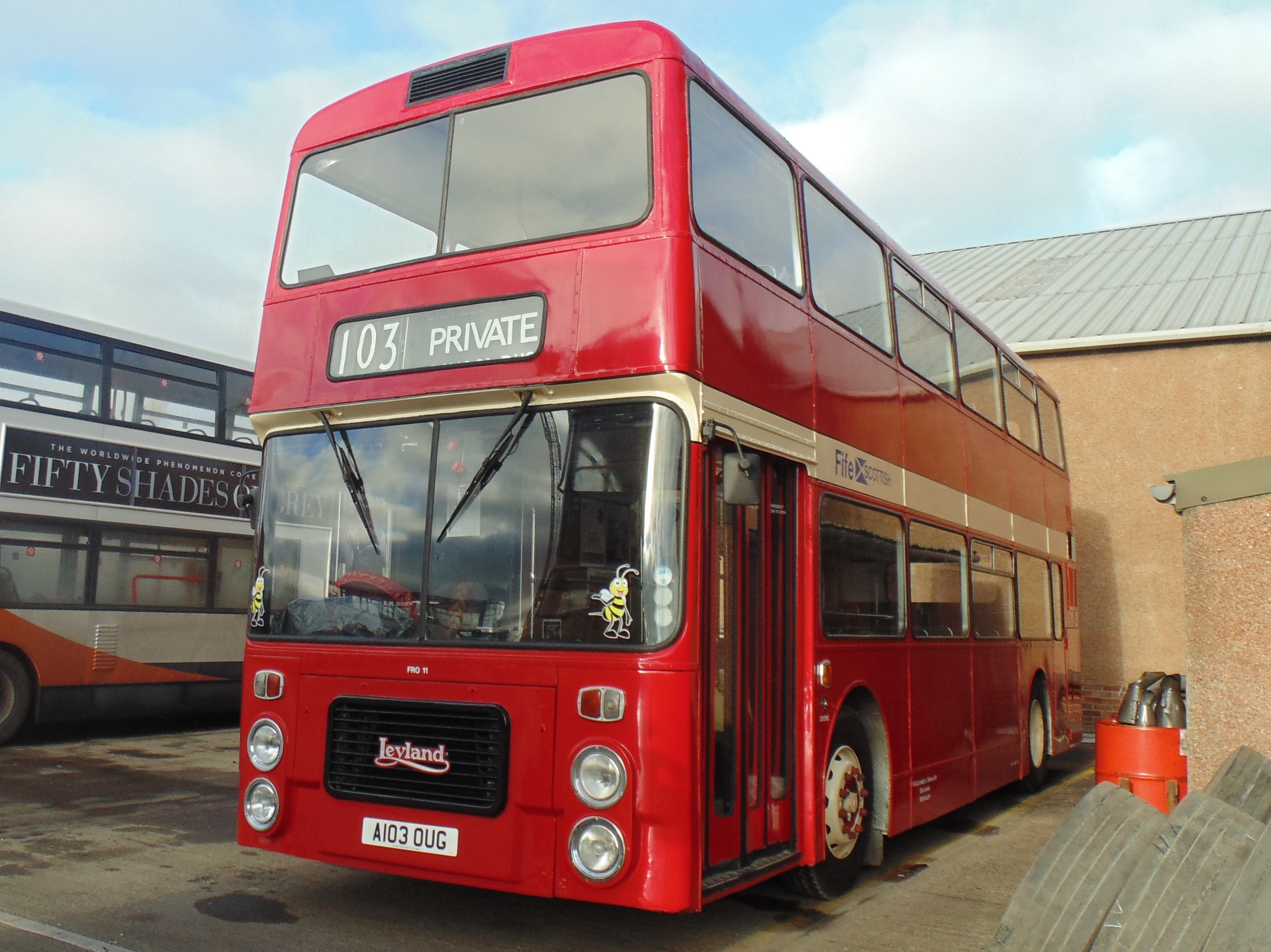
Preserved Fife Scottish Northern Counties bodied Leyland Olympian in Aberhill in February 2015

Fife Scottish's origins can be traced back to 1909, where after numerous buyouts and mergers, the company became part of W. Alexander & Sons. In 1961, Walter Alexander & Sons was split into three separate companies, with the Fife operations becoming Alexanders (Fife), the colour ayres red being used as the main fleet colour. Alexanders (Fife) was included with the purchase of W. Alexander & Sons by Scottish Motor Traction, which following the passage of the Transport Act 1968, merged with other bus operators to form the Scottish Bus Group (SBG) on 1 January 1969.

Fife Scottish was first created by the SBG in 1978 as part of the rebranding of the Alexanders (Fife) operation. The company retained the red and cream livery as well as the Alexanders (Fife) legal address, however it adopted a group standard logo consisting of three-quarters of a blue saltire between the words 'Fife' and 'Scottish'. From its head office in Kirkcaldy, Fife Scottish operated throughout the ancient kingdom and beyond to Dundee and Edinburgh as the largest bus operator in the region, being responsible for urban, rural and interurban services in towns such as St Andrews, Dunfermline, Cowdenbeath, Glenrothes and Leven. Fife Scottish also provided coaches for Scottish Citylink services, which were operated mainly from Fife to other destinations across Scotland.

In preparation for the deregulation of the bus industry on 26 October 1986, which would ultimately see the breakup of the Scottish Bus Group, Fife Scottish Omnibuses Ltd. was created amid the reorganisation of all SBG subsidiaries. Fife Scottish was the only SBG subsidiary to survive the reorganisation without losing any of its operating areas to the four new companies formed by the SBG, although it did not gain any operating area from any pre-existing subsidiaries. The SBG corporate fleet name style was retained, albeit printed in an unusually large size and placed on buses painted with larger areas of cream.

Although Fife Scottish did not expand into the nearby cities of Edinburgh and Dundee following deregulation, the company still endured competition within its operating area. Rennie's of Dunfermline were the first challengers to Fife Scottish, however the largest and most sustained competition came from local coach operator Moffat & Williamson, who built up a substantial network of services throughout much of Fife that mirrored Fife Scottish's network. A "bus war" broke out in Fife between Fife Scottish, Rennie's and Moffat & Williamson, however Rennies soon withdrew from Dunfermline while Moffat & Williamson scaled back its operations, though still retaining pockets of strong competition in the industrialised towns in the south of Fife.

=== Stagecoach sale controversy ===
Despite enduring heavy competition, Fife Scottish remained the most profitable of the SBG subsidiaries throughout the SBG's gradual breakup. When the company was put on the market in February 1991 as the penultimate SBG subsidiary to be sold, Competitive bids were placed to buy the company, with Fife Scottish's employees led by managing director Derek Stuart offering to perform either a management buyout or an employee share ownership plan as 'Henjac 171', while fast-growing Perth independent Stagecoach Holdings, who had already purchased former SBG subsidiary Bluebird Northern, also placed a bid to buy the company outright. Stagecoach was initially planned to be announced as the preferred bidder for Fife Scottish, however following pressure from regional Scottish Labour MPs Henry McLeish, Gordon Brown and Lewis Moonie, the sale was delayed less than two hours before a planned press conference after the Henjac team were permitted to submit a £9 million (equivalent to £24,405,000 in 2023) bid rivalling Stagecoach's, forcing Parliamentary Under-Secretary of State for Scotland James Douglas-Hamilton to launch a review of the sale.

For six weeks between late May and July 1991, the Henjac employee team and Stagecoach Holdings competed with one another, placing revised bids. Following an initial judicial review, Secretary of State for Scotland Ian Lang announced that he would grant Stagecoach preferred bidder status, causing outcry amid claims the Henjac bid was higher than Stagecoach's. The Henjac team went to the Court of Session in Edinburgh in an attempt to make Ian Lang reconsider his views on Staegcoach's bid, and although an appeal for an interim interdict was rejected, the sale to Stagecoach was blocked when the Scottish Transport Group agreed not to sell Fife Scottish to Stagecoach Holdings until the hearing into the sale was concluded. Despite three of four of Fife Scottish's senior managers withdrawing from the Henjac team in July 1991 as a result of a disagreement over a proposed share structure, a bid to throw out Henjac's case was rejected by the Court of Session. However, it was subsequently ruled by Lord Coulsfield that no grounds had been established by Henjac to justify a judicial review of Ian Lang's decision, and ultimately, Fife Scottish was purchased by Stagecoach Holdings for £9.1 million (equivalent to £24,676,000 in 2023).

Following the sale, Stagecoach engaged in increasingly severe competition with Moffat & Williamson following the purchase of Fife Scottish, which was criticised for being predatory and uncompetitive, and a loss-making Moffat & Williamson was forced to withdraw the majority of its competing services despite Stagecoach being reprimanded by the Office of Fair Trading. This resulted in Stagecoach Fife Scottish becoming the sole operator in much of the kingdom.
