= Scottish Citylink =

Intercity coach operator in Scotland

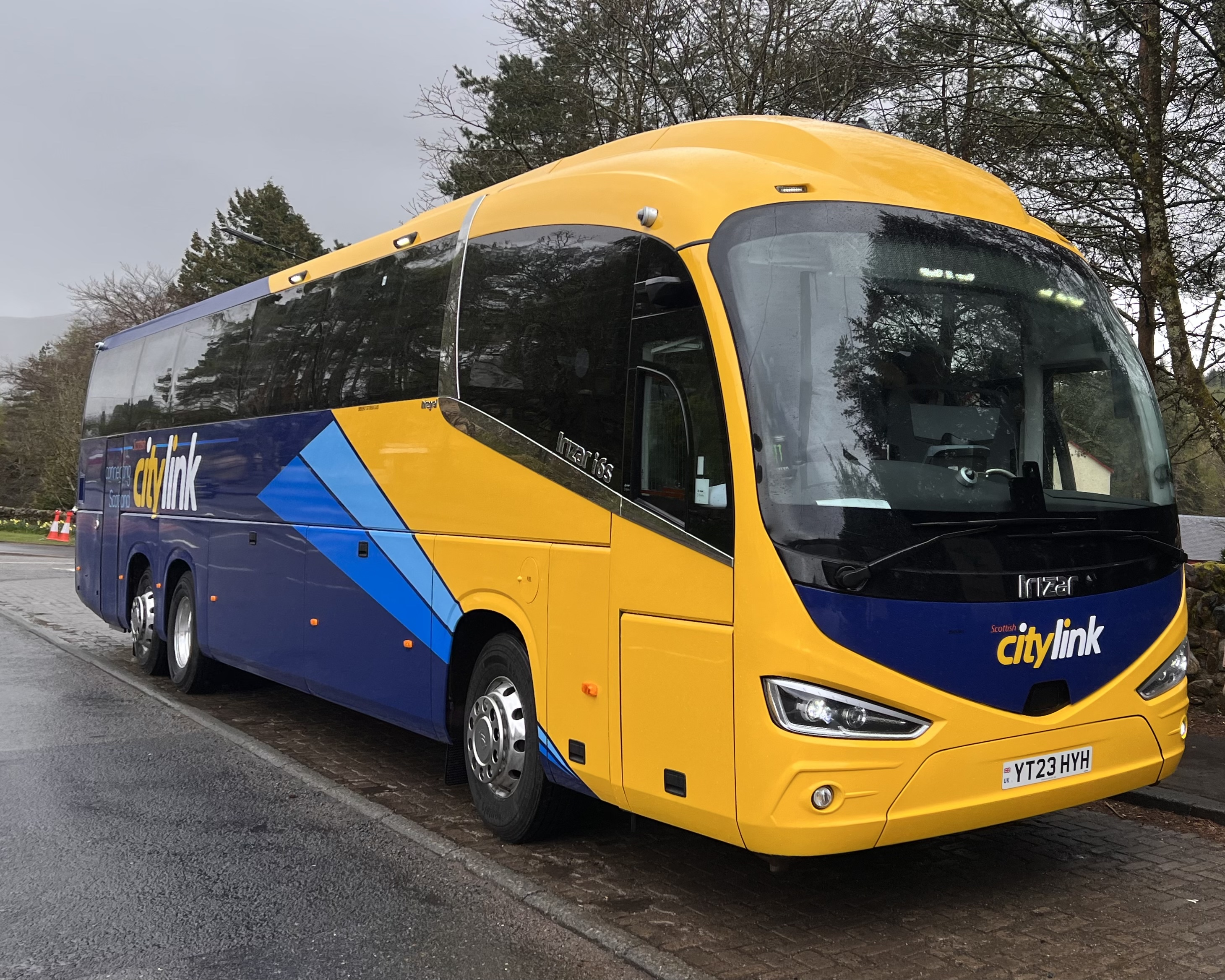
- Citylink branded Irizar i6s operated by West Coast Motors in Tyndrum in May 2023
- Parent: ComfortDelGro (62.5%); Stagecoach Group (37.5%)
- Founded: March 1985
- Headquarters: Glasgow, Scotland, UK
- Service area: Scotland
- Service type: Long-distance coach services
- Routes: 25 (3 Seasonal)
- Hubs: Aberdeen; Edinburgh; Glasgow; Stirling; Inverness; Perth; Dundee
- Operator: Park's of Hamilton; Shiel Buses; McLeans Coaches; Stagecoach East Scotland; Stagecoach Highlands; Stagecoach West Scotland; Ulsterbus; West Coast Motors; D&E Coaches
- Website: www.citylink.co.uk

Scottish Citylink is a long-distance express coach operator in Scotland and Ireland (where it operates as Irish Citylink) and formerly England (where it operated as Stansted Citylink). The company was formed as a subsidiary of Scottish Transport Group in March 1985. It is operated as a 63/37 joint venture between ComfortDelGro and Stagecoach.

== Operation ==
Scottish Citylink operates an extensive network of long-distance express services within Scotland, operating 19 routes linking the cities of Glasgow, Edinburgh, Aberdeen, Dundee, Stirling and Inverness, as well as linking some rural Highland communities to the main urban areas of Scotland. Services also operate to Northern Ireland, with a connection via the ferry link between Cairnryan and Belfast, and there are seasonal workings to Blackpool. In all, over 200 destinations are served by Scottish Citylink within Scotland, using about 90 coaches provided by operators local to the 'destination' area, carrying over three million passengers annually.

Despite the extent of Citylink's operations in Scotland, there are notable geographical regions, including large urban areas, that have poor or no connections with the network. These tend to be areas served by subsidiaries of Stagecoach, which operate their own comprehensive network, to destinations such as Ayrshire (Kilmarnock, Ayr and Irvine), Fife (Kirkcaldy, Dunfermline and St Andrews), Aberdeenshire and Moray. A notable exception is the Scottish Borders, which is covered by West Coast Motors, though they have no regular express service.

Citylink also operates in the Republic of Ireland, operating between Dublin, Galway City, Clifden, Cork and Shannon.

== History ==
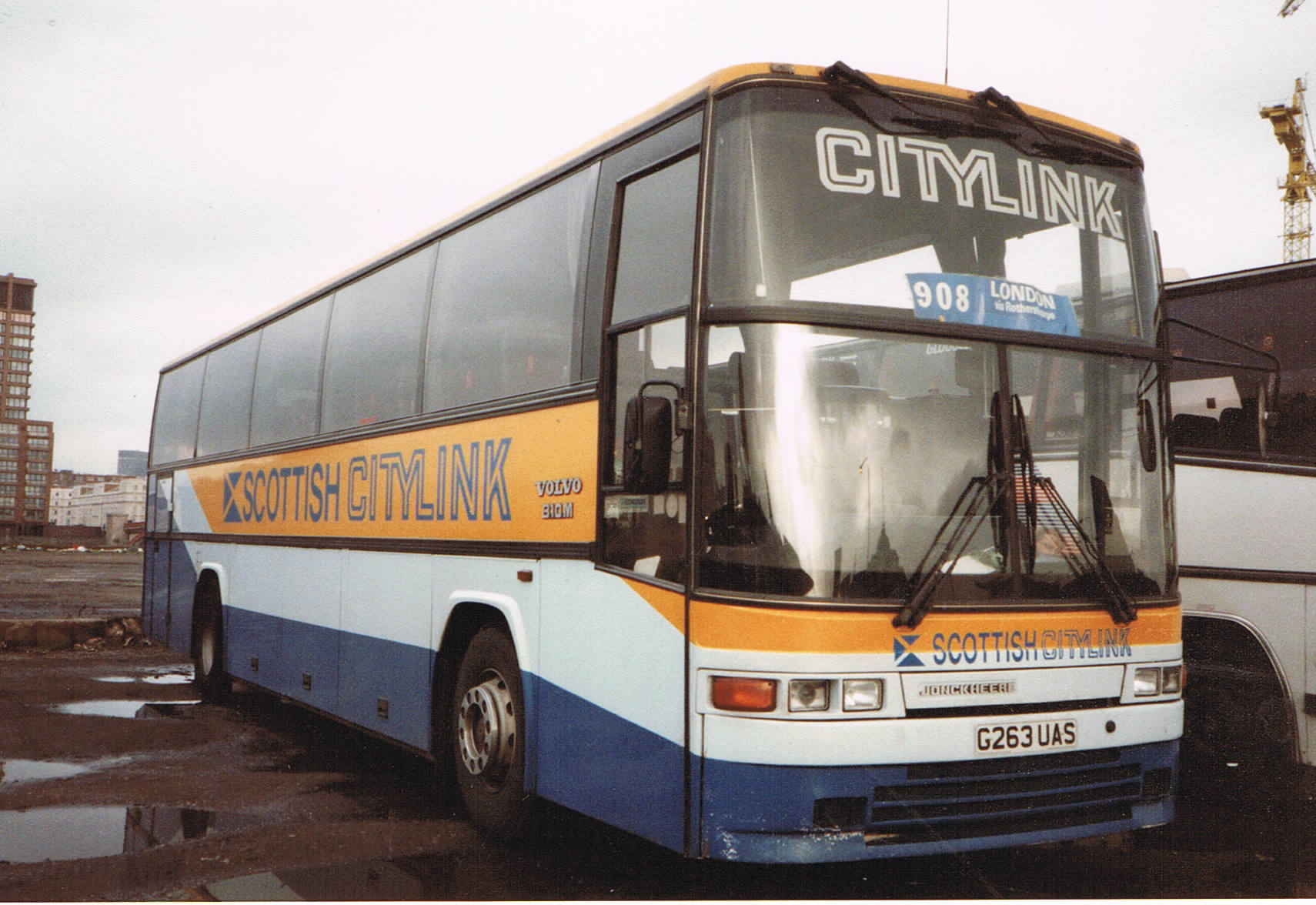
Jonckheere bodied Volvo B10M operated by Rapsons at Vauxhall Bridge Coach Park

Scottish Citylink was created in October 1983 as route branding to improve the public awareness of the for Scottish Bus Group's commuter coach network, and within a year, passengers numbers had risen by 30%. On 1 March 1985, as part of the reorganisation of the Scottish Bus Group, it become a stand alone company to co-ordinate and manage the long-distance express services operated by the other SBG subsidiaries, particularly the Western Scottish and Eastern Scottish services from Glasgow and Edinburgh to London and the south.

By combining the SBG express network, Citylink became the largest operator of long-distance express services within Scotland, and from Scotland to England and Wales. With the main hubs in Glasgow and Edinburgh, many services to the Highlands and Islands were in some cases vital to rural areas as the only public transport link available.

One vehicle was owned to satisfy licensing conditions, but this was operated as part of the Western Scottish fleet. Citylink itself did not operate any vehicles, but a uniform two-tone blue and yellow livery was introduced for coaches operating Citylink services, with the subsidiary's corporate fleetname displayed on the front and rear of the vehicle. Previously, only cross-border services had adopted some form of corporate look in the late 1970s, with vehicles wearing a simple but striking blue-and-white livery with bold Scottish fleetnames in the SBG corporate logo style.

Subsidiary companies operated Citylink vehicles on express services originating from their operating area, and where long-distance services spanned one or two operating areas, the routes were shared between the companies. The level of involvement of the subsidiary firms in providing Citylink work varied with size and geography. Central Scottish, Strathtay Scottish, Kelvin Scottish and Clydeside Scottish were the smaller contributors as no major city or destination lay within their main operating regions. Indeed, Clydeside marketed its own express services within its area as Clydeside Quicksilver with its own distinct brand.

As the Scottish Bus Group prepared for privatisation, Citylink franchises were no longer exclusive to the SBG subsidiaries. Private companies such as Rapsons Coaches of Inverness, Henry Crawford Coaches of Neilston, West Coast Motors of Campbeltown, Skye-Ways and Park's of Hamilton were awarded Citylink contracts and provided vehicles of their own for this work. Also seen using a Citylink livery but with the distinctive Ulsterman lettering, Ulsterbus provided coaches for services between Derry or Belfast to Birmingham and London via towns in Dumfries and Galloway. This route was also operated by Dodds of Troon and Western Scottish.

Citylink itself was privatised in August 1990, operating under the Clansman Travel & Leisure holding company after being purchased by its management and employees in a management buyout. As the Scottish Bus Group broke up, the number of private operators working Citylink contracts increased. Park's, West Coast Motors and Rapsons were now major contributors, while the former SBG companies now owned by Stagecoach (Fife Scottish, Western Scottish, Bluebird Buses) began operating their own Stagecoach Express network.

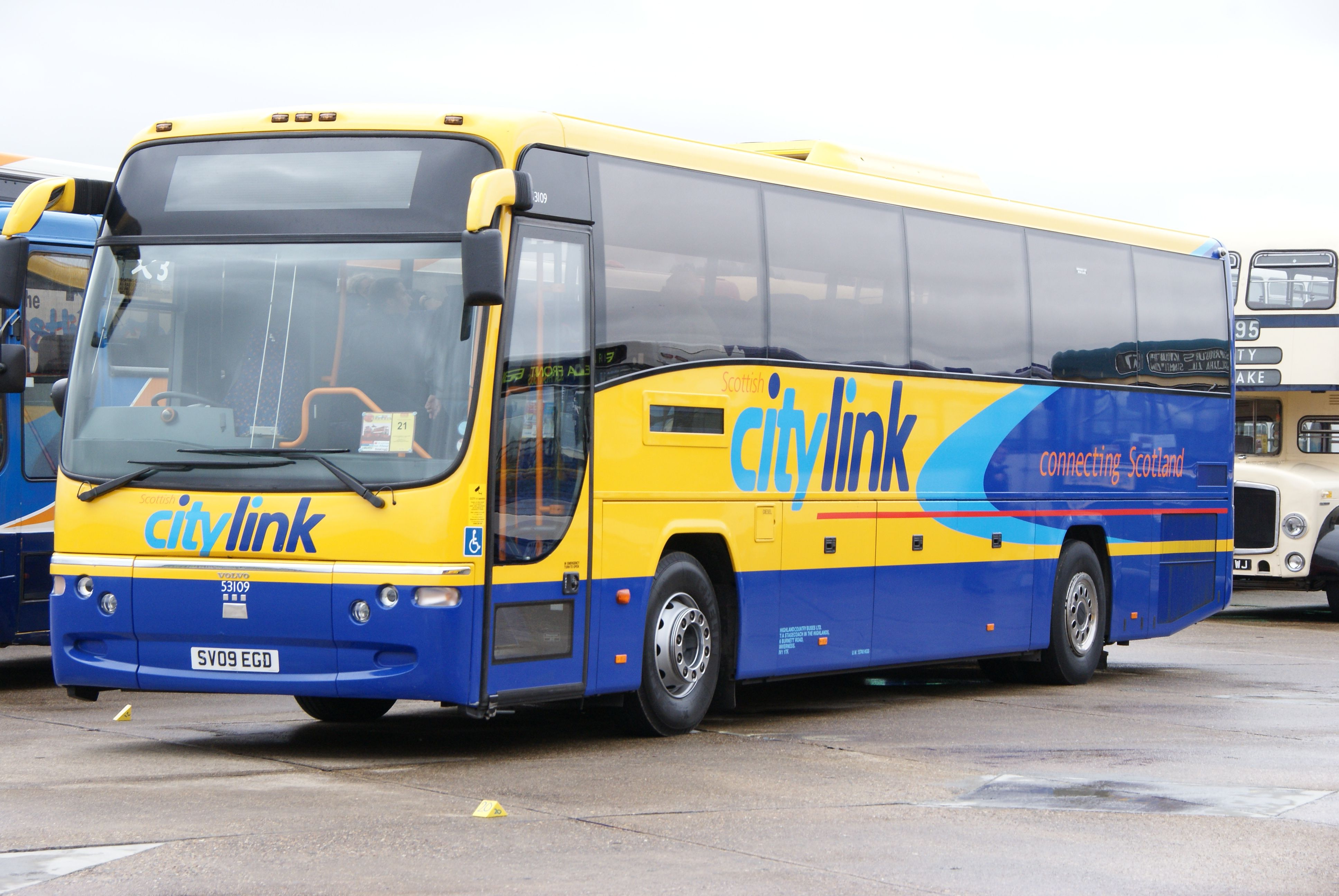
Plaxton Panther bodied Volvo B12B in September 2010

In 1993 Scottish Citylink was sold to National Express. At that time, cross border services to England were replaced by National Express services, leaving Citylink with Scottish domestic services, and co-ordinated timetabling and ticketing was introduced between the two operators. During this period, Citylink took a stake in West Coast Motors, purchased Skye-Ways Coaches and also Highland Country Buses, which was an offshoot of Highland Scottish.

With the privatisation of British Rail, in 1997 National Express won the ScotRail franchise. The Mergers & Monopolies Commission ruled this would give National Express a monopoly on long-distance services in Scotland and ordered the sale of Scottish Citylink. Scottish Citylink was subsequently sold to Metroline, the London-based subsidiary of ComfortDelGro, for £10.3 million in August 1998.

In 2002, the company began trading in the Republic of Ireland, acquiring Cummer Commercials, which operated on the Dublin to Galway route (and also traded as CityLink Express). The route has since been rebranded to the yellow-blue Citylink livery (although without the "Scottish" prefix) and has expanded to provide services from Galway to Shannon.

Ownership of Scottish Citylink was transferred from Metroline plc to Bradell plc, another subsidiary of ComfortDelGro, on 31 December 2004. Following Stagecoach's launch of Megabus and acquisition of the Motorvator brand in 2003 and 2004 respectively, Stagecoach and CostaDelGro agreed for Scottish Citylink to become a joint venture on 12 September 2005. In return for 35% of the company, Stagecoach transferred rights to operate select Megabus and Motorvator routes in Scotland to Scottish Citylink and sub-contracted as an operator, while ComfortDelGro maintained a majority 65% stake.

Following Stagecoach's takeover by a DWS-managed investment fund, it agreed to sell its Megabus retail platform and customer service business as well as the Falcon South-West brand running between Plymouth and Bristol Airport to Scottish Citylink. In return, its shareholding increased to 37.5%, with ComfortDelGro decreasing theirs to 62.5%. As part of an original plan to merge with rival intercity coach operator National Express, Stagecoach had agreed to sell its shareholding to ComfortDelGro to satisfy Competition & Markets Authority demands, however this deal fell through.

== Present ==
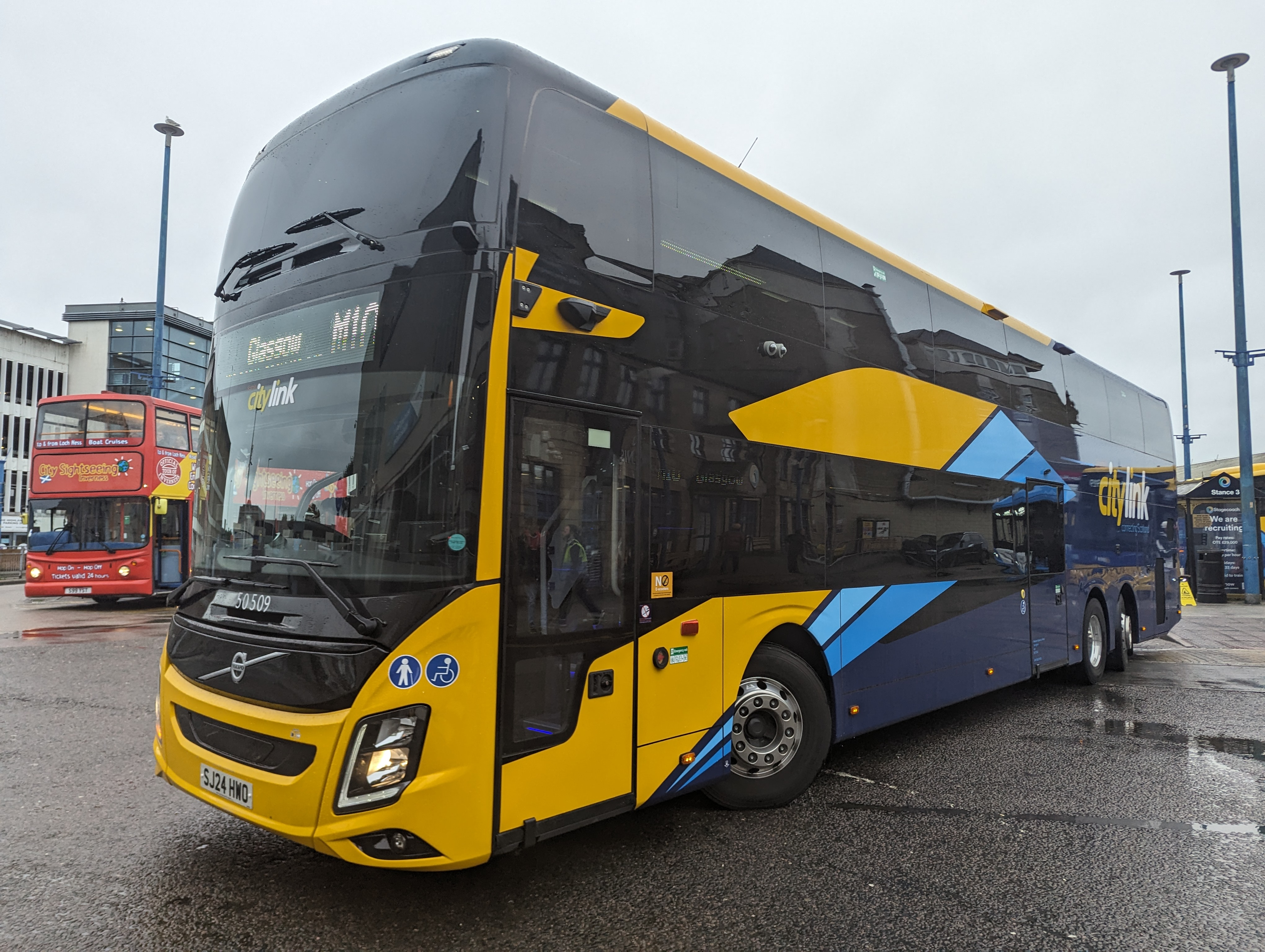
Volvo 9700DD bodied Volvo B13RLE at Inverness bus station on the M10 service to Glasgow in May 2024

The company's current head office is at Buchanan bus station in Glasgow, where many of its services start and terminate. Citylink itself does not operate or own buses in its own right, although one owned and operated by Stagecoach West Scotland carries CityLink accreditation to satisfy licensing conditions. The two-tone blue and yellow colour scheme is still used, though its application and style have changed over the years.

From 2004, the operating companies faced heavy competition from Megabus and Motorvator, both subsidiaries of Stagecoach. In September 2005 ComfortDelGro and Stagecoach agreed to a joint venture to provide express coach services in Scotland, ending the competition between the two operators. Under the terms of the agreement, Stagecoach gained a 35% shareholding in Scottish Citylink and in return granted certain rights to the Megabus and Motorvator brands in Scotland.

Despite being a minority shareholder, Stagecoach appeared to have assumed operational control. Stagecoach staff replaced much of the former Citylink management, while Stagecoach's Scottish subsidiaries began operating many of the routes formerly operated by subcontractors displaced from Citylink work. Citylink service numbers, timetables and routes were also sacrificed in favour of Megabus where the two brands overlapped.

In March 2006 the Competition Commission launched an investigation and ruled that the joint venture substantially reduced competition and that evidence suggested it led to higher fares on some routes. Stagecoach immediately criticised the ruling, stating that a period of further consultation would cause uncertainty among passengers and leave vital services in limbo, while jeopardising Scotland's intercity coach network and its ability to compete with both train and car Criticism of the Competition Commission's draft findings grew in Scotland and the joint venture received support from across the political spectrum in the Scottish Parliament In early 2008, certain routes, which were at the time already contacted out to Park's, were divested to comply with the ruling.

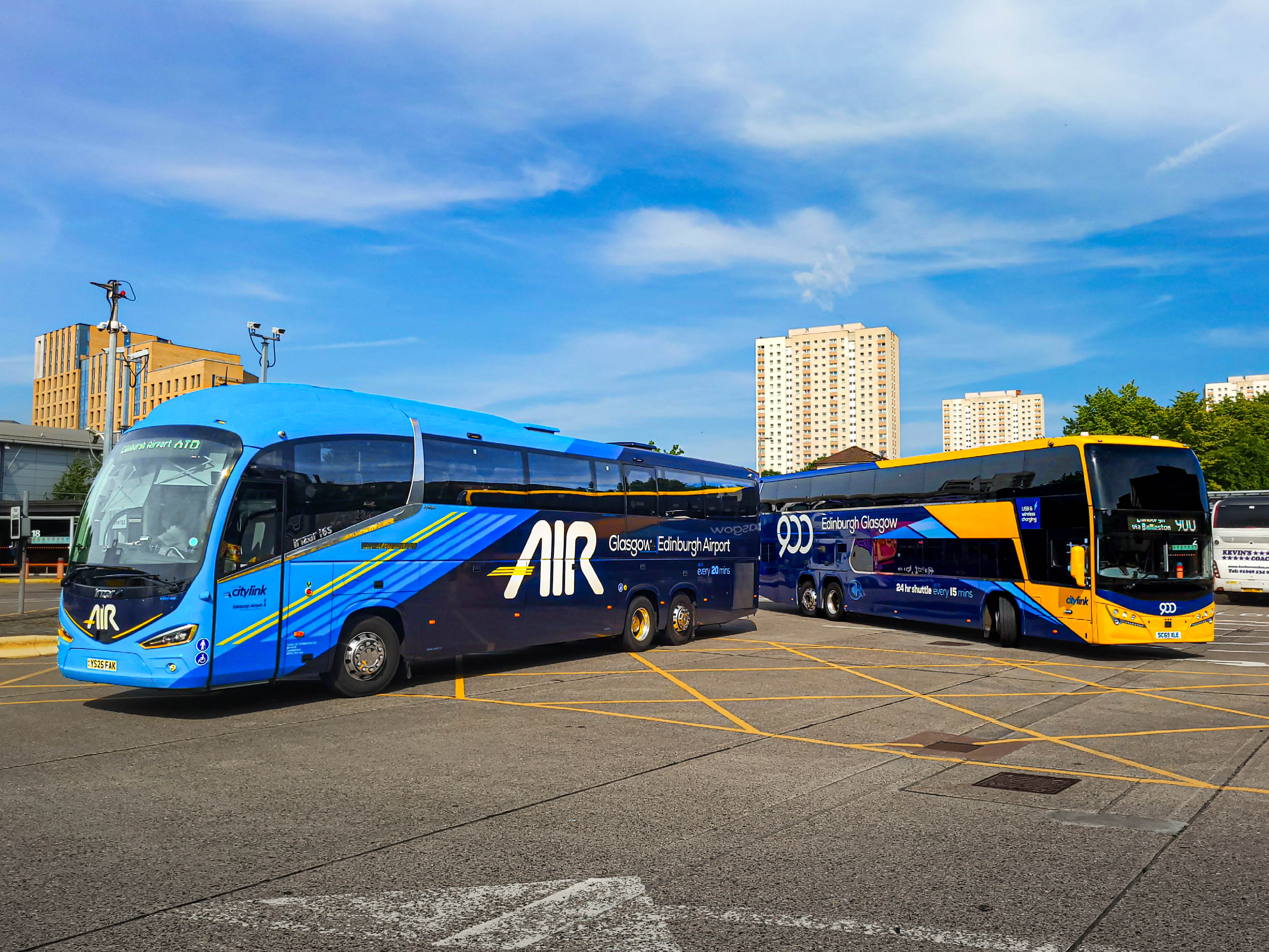
Scottish Citylink AIR & 900 route-branded coaches at Buchanan Bus Station, Glasgow.

Today many of the services are operated by Stagecoach subsidiaries Stagecoach East Scotland, Stagecoach Highlands and Stagecoach West Scotland. Some services are operated by Edinburgh Coach Lines, Shiel Buses and West Coast Motors.

In May 2023, West Coast Motors became the first operator on the Citylink network to operate mirrorless coaches. The company introduced six brand new DAF-powered Irizar i6s tri-axle coaches on routes to Fort William, Skye, and Campbeltown.

In February 2024, Scottish Citylink launched its own app. In December 2024,Scottish Citylink purchased new Transmach ticket machines. This allowed the use of QR codes for the first time and eliminated the requirement for paper passenger manifests.

== Routes and Operators ==
As of October 2026, Scottish Citylink operates the following routes.

Route number	Start point	via	End point	Notes
618	Glasgow	Carlisle	Blackpool	Mon & Fri Summer only
900	Edinburgh	Harthill, Maxim Park and/or Easterhouse	Glasgow	24 hour service. Certain journeys serve Edinburgh Airport and/or Deer Park, Livingston
902	Edinburgh Airport	Broxburn, Livingston, Harthill, Chapelhall, Airdrie, Coatbridge	Glasgow	
903	Edinburgh	Bathgate, Easterhouse, Glasgow City Centre, SEC, Scotstoun, Yoker, Renfrew Bridge, Renfrew	Glasgow Airport	Some services begin/terminate at Blantyre towards Glasgow Airport
909	Edinburgh	Edinburgh Airport, Bo'ness, Grangemouth, Stirling	Stirling University	Some services begin/terminate at Dunblane
913	Edinburgh	Halbeath P&R, Kinross P&R, Perth Broxden P&R, Crieff, St Fillans, Lix Toll, Tyndrum, Glen Coe	Fort William	Summer only, connects with 977 service at Tyndrum
914	Glasgow	Loch Lomond, Tyndrum, Glen Coe	Fort William	
915	Glasgow	Glasgow Airport, Loch Lomond, Tyndrum, Glen Coe, Fort William, Spean Bridge, Invergarry, Dornie, Kyle of Lochalsh, Portree	Uig	
912	Edinburgh	Halbeath P&R, Kinross P&R, Perth Broxden P&R, Pitlochry, Aviemore, Inverness, Drumnadrochit, Dornie, Kyle of Lochalsh		Starts 17 May 2025
917	Inverness	Drumnadrochit, Urquhart Castle, Dornie, Kyle of Lochalsh	Portree	
918	Oban	Benderloch, Appin, Duror	Fort William	Operated by West Coast Motors. Tickets available through Citylink.
919	Inverness	Drumnadrochit, Urquhart Castle, Fort Augustus, Invergarry, Spean Bridge	Fort William	
500	Fort William	Corpach, Glenfinnan, Arisaig	Mallaig	Operated by Shiel Buses. Tickets available through Citylink.
923	Glasgow	Ayr, Cairnryan (Stena Line Terminal)	Stranraer	Connects with Stena Line ferry to Belfast, buses towards Stranraer display 'Belfast' on the destination display.
926	Glasgow	Loch Lomond, Arrochar, Inveraray, Lochgilphead, Ardrishaig, Tarbert, Kennacraig	Campbeltown	Certain services operate via Glasgow Airport
961	Inverness	Garve	Ullapool	Connects with CalMac ferry to Stornoway.
975	Glasgow	Loch Lomond, Tyndrum, Dalmally	Oban	
976	Glasgow	Loch Lomond, Arrochar, Inveraray, Dalmally	Oban	
977	Glasgow	Glasgow Airport, Loch Lomond, Tyndrum, Dalmally	Oban	Summer only, connects with 913 service at Tyndrum
978	Oban	Dalmally, Tyndrum, Lix Toll, Lochearnhead, Doune, Stirling, Grangemouth, Edinburgh Airport	Edinburgh	
AIR	Edinburgh Airport	Harthill, Maxim Park	Glasgow	
M6	Glasgow	Cumbernauld, Falkirk, Edinburgh Airport, Perth, Dundee	Aberdeen	
M8	Glasgow	Cumbernauld, Stirling, Bridge of Allan, Dunblane, Auchterarder, Perth Broxden P&R, Perth, Inchture	Dundee	Certain journeys operated by Parks of Hamilton.
M9	Glasgow	Perth Broxden P&R, Dundee	Aberdeen	Certain journeys operate via Cumbernauld, Stirling, Perth City Centre and/or Forfar. Certain journeys operated by Parks of Hamilton.
M10	Glasgow	Perth Broxden P&R, Pitlochry, Aviemore	Inverness	
M90	Edinburgh	Halbeath P&R, Kinross P&R, Perth Broxden P&R, Pitlochry, Dalwhinnie, Aviemore	Inverness	Certain journeys operate via and/or terminate at Perth Bus Station.
M91	Edinburgh	Halbeath P&R, Kinross P&R, Perth Broxden P&R, Perth, Luncarty, Birnam, Ballinluig, Pitlochry, Blair Atholl, House of Bruar, Dalwhinnie, Newtonmore, Kingussie, Kincraig, Aviemore, Tomatin	Inverness	Operated by Parks of Hamilton.
M92	Edinburgh	Halbeath P&R, Kinross P&R, Dundee	Aberdeen	Certain journeys operate via Edinburgh Airport, Perth Broxden P&R and/or Forfar.
M96	Aberdeen	Huntly, Elgin, Nairn	Inverness	Operated by Stagecoach Bluebird.Tickets available through Citylink.

A variety of companies operate services on behalf of Scottish Citylink. The main operators are;

- Stagecoach
- Parks of Hamilton
- West Coast Motors
- Shiel Buses
- Edinburgh Coach Lines
- Ulsterbus

Some smaller private operators also operate duplicate and additional journeys, as well as standby rolls at major interchanges. These include Ratho Coaches, Simpsons of Rosehearty, Hairy Haggis Coaches of Bathgate, McLean's of Airdrie, Fishers Tours of Dundee (which is now closed since 2025), King Coaches (First Aberdeen), D&E Coaches & Central Coaches of Aberdeen.

== Citylink Gold ==
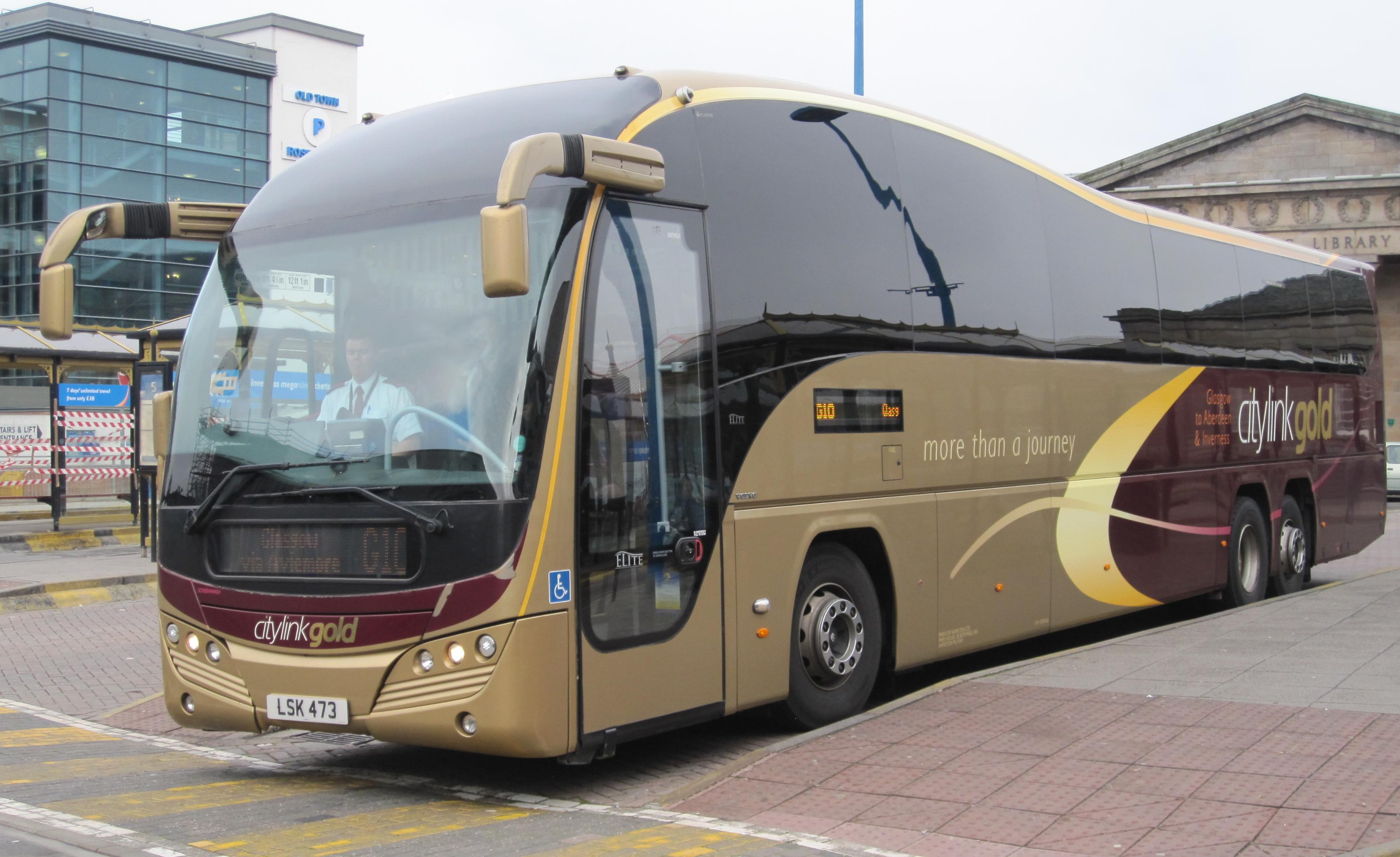
Citylink Gold Plaxton Elite bodied Volvo B13RT at Inverness bus station in October 2013

In 2010, Citylink launched the "Gold" brand for services between Glasgow and Aberdeen or Inverness. The Citylink Gold brand is similar to the Stagecoach Gold brand used by Stagecoach bus subsidiaries, and offers a more luxurious service with leather seats, free wi-fi and extra services aboard. The service is also intended to provide quicker journeys than the regular bus routes which may service significant numbers of smaller towns and settlements along their routes, though may stop at those towns or settlements deemed to be important to serve. With Citylink Gold, passengers are offered free tea, coffee, cold drinks and snacks on the coach. As of May 2019, five return services per day in each direction on routes from Glasgow to Aberdeen and four return services from Glasgow to Inverness, additionally, three Edinburgh to Inverness return services and also four Edinburgh to Aberdeen return services, all now designated as Citylink Gold. Fares have remained the same with Super Singles available on the routes as they were whilst under standard Citylink branding. The Citylink Gold services are as follows:

- G9 Glasgow – Aberdeen
- G10 Glasgow – Aviemore – Inverness
- G90 Edinburgh – Perth – Pitlochry – Aviemore – Inverness
- G92 Edinburgh – Halbeath – Dundee – Aberdeen

The Gold service was withdrawn in March 2020 and replaced with the "6 Cities" brand in collaboration with Megabus.

== Stansted Citylink ==
On 11 December 2015, a St Pancras railway station to Stansted Airport service commenced under the Stansted Citylink banner. The service ceased operations nearly two years later on 28 October 2017.
