= Kelvin Scottish =

Bus operating subsidiary

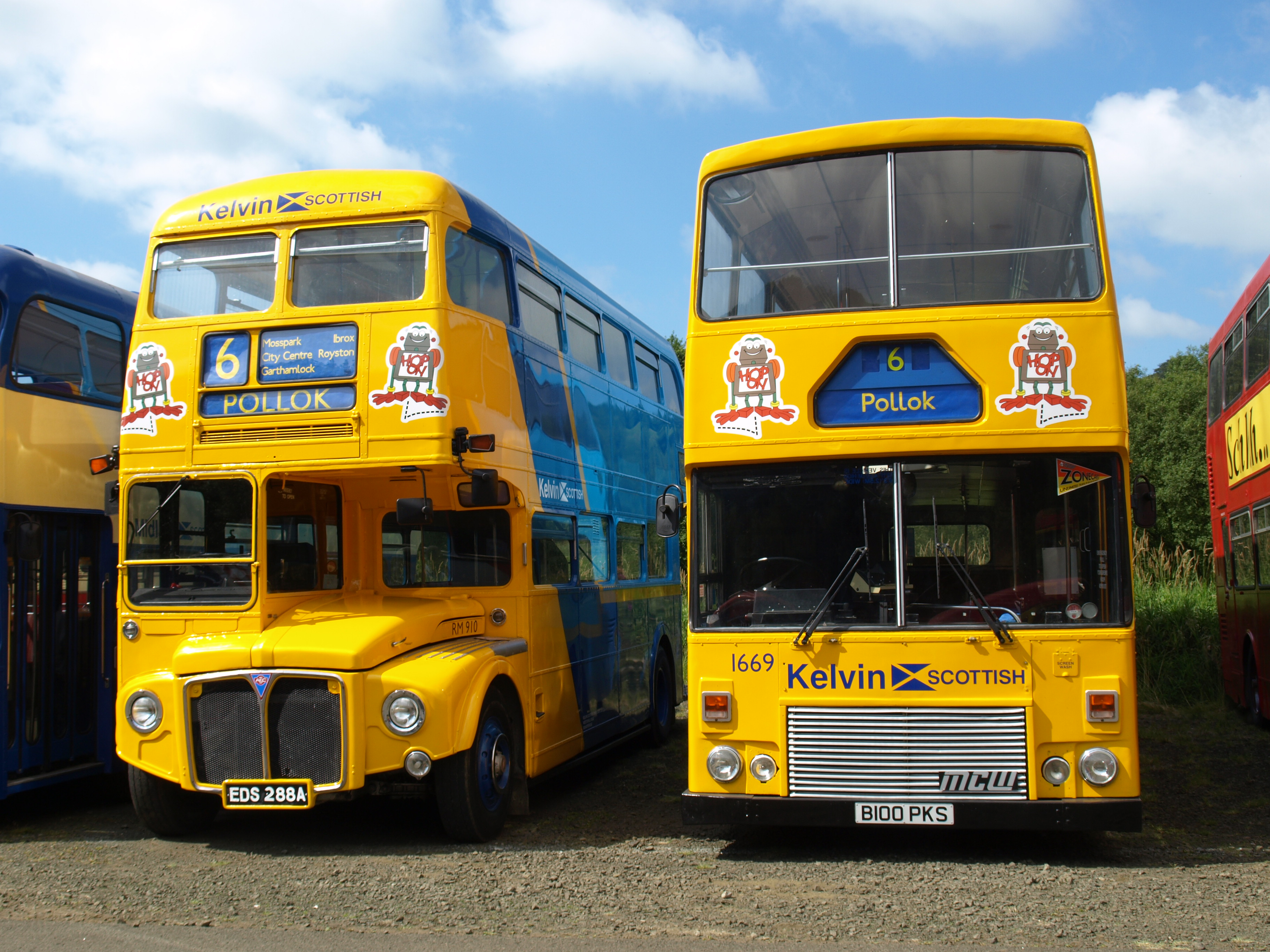
- Parent: Scottish Bus Group
- Founded: 1985
- Defunct: 1989
- Headquarters: Bishopbriggs
- Service area: East Dunbartonshire; West Dunbartonshire; North Lanarkshire; Glasgow
- Service type: Buses
- Fleet: 380 vehicles

Kelvin Scottish Omnibuses Ltd was a bus operating subsidiary of the Scottish Transport Group based in Bishopbriggs, Strathclyde, Scotland. It was formed in March 1985 from parts of Walter Alexander & Sons (Midland) Ltd and Central SMT, initially with six depots and a varied fleet of 381 vehicles.

The company expanded its operations in Glasgow prior to bus deregulation in 1986. New services were introduced in competition with Strathclyde Buses, many using AEC Routemaster double-deckers operated by conductors. Kelvin suffered from vehicle maintenance problems, and on two occasions was forced to hire vehicles from other companies to ensure operation of all its routes. After Kelvin lost money in 1987, the depot at Milngavie was closed and many routes withdrawn.

In July 1989 Kelvin was merged with Central Scottish to form Kelvin Central Buses. This company was sold to its employees on privatisation, before being taken over by Strathclyde Buses. It is now part of First Glasgow.

== Operation ==
Operating from its head office in Bishopbriggs and depots in Old Kilpatrick, Milngavie, Kirkintilloch, Kilsyth, Stepps and Cumbernauld, Kelvin Scottish had an operating area bounded by Loch Lomond to the west, Cumbernauld to the east, the Campsie Fells to the north and the River Clyde to the south. Kelvin was the largest operator in Dunbartonshire and north east Glasgow, and was responsible for urban, rural and interurban services. Its operating area had previously been served by W. Alexander & Sons (Midland), Central SMT and Scottish Omnibuses (whose Baillieston depot had closed a few months earlier in 1985, with its vehicles and operations having transferred to Alexander (Midland) at Stepps).

== History ==
Kelvin was created by the Scottish Bus Group (SBG) as a limited company wholly owned by the group in March 1985 in preparation for bus deregulation the following year, and began operation three months later. It was the largest of the four new companies created by the SBG in 1985, with an initial fleet of 381 vehicles, of which almost 300 were sourced from the former Alexander (Midland) fleet.

In early 1986, maintenance problems saw a number of vehicles banned from use by vehicle examiners from the Ministry of Transport. The company was forced to hire eight vehicles from other companies to keep services running; they remained in the fleet for four weeks while the regular vehicles were repaired. Similar issues resurfaced in February 1987, when twelve vehicles were hired for three weeks.

Deregulation presented both challenges and opportunities for Kelvin Scottish. During the regulated era, bus operators were protected from competition but could not change their routes without the approval of the licensing authority, and rival operators could object to applications. Historically, Glasgow Corporation had sought to prevent Scottish Bus Group services from penetrating into the middle of the city centre, partly to avoid congestion in the busiest streets but also as a means of bolstering their own tramway revenue. When Kelvin Scottish was formed, the former Alexander (Midland) and Scottish Omnibuses routes from north and east of the city terminated at Buchanan bus station on the northern edge of the city centre, whilst the former Central SMT routes from the west used Anderston bus station on the western extremity of the city centre. Passengers wishing to travel further into the city centre had to either walk or change to a Strathclyde Buses service. Deregulation allowed services to be extended further into the city centre, which would make services more convenient for passengers. On the other hand, a significant proportion of Kelvin's route network served the city's suburbs and peripheral estates and had been protected from competition from Strathclyde Buses due to the arbitrary company boundaries which regulation had created. As the city had expanded outward, Glasgow Corporation had not been allowed to extend its own services to serve these new estates as they were deemed to be SBG 'territory'. These busy and profitable urban routes were an important part of Kelvin's business, but with deregulation Strathclyde Buses would be able to extend their existing city services out to serve these areas, which would cause a serious loss of revenue for Kelvin. The inherited route network was therefore extensively reorganised in an effort to retain as many of the suburban passengers as possible whilst gaining new passengers within the city.

Although deregulation itself took place in October 1986, Kelvin received permission to introduce its new routes from 31 August. Many of the routes serving the suburbs and peripheral estates were linked together to create new cross-city routes instead of terminating in the city centre, with some of these being operated by former London Transport AEC Routemasters. The elderly Routemasters were faster than other buses because instead of passengers paying the driver on entry the fares were collected by a conductor whilst on the move, and the much shorter dwell time at bus stops gave Kelvin a competitive advantage over Strathclyde Buses' slower one-person-operated services. Some cross-city routes were operated jointly with Clydeside Scottish, and a number of new services were started on city routes which had not hitherto been served by the Scottish Bus Group. Another competitive tactic was the introduction of minibus services in the north of Glasgow, providing services into city centre at a much higher frequency than would have been viable using full-sized buses. In response Strathclyde Buses extended many of its city services not just into the peripheral parts of the city traditionally served by Kelvin, but also beyond the city boundary and deep into SBG territory, including the towns of Clydebank, Milngavie, Kirkintilloch and Cumbernauld.

Immediately after deregulation the 'bus war' between SBG and Strathclyde Buses, together with some independent operators such as Magic Bus, saw a major increase in the number of buses serving the city centre. However the situation was not sustainable as there were not enough passengers to make so many competing services viable, and ultimately Strathclyde Buses prevailed. In 1987 Kelvin made a reported loss of £3 million, leading to the closure of the depot at Milngavie. Many of the competing routes introduced in 1986 were withdrawn in July 1987, and 70 vehicles were taken out of service, including some Routemasters and the majority of the new minibuses. By early 1988 the fleet had been reduced by more than a third, and Kilsyth depot also closed in 1988 as an economy measure.

In July 1989, it was announced that SBG was to be privatised. In an effort to make Kelvin Scottish more attractive to prospective buyers, Kelvin was merged with the more profitable Central Scottish to form Kelvin Central Buses Ltd. Upon the merger, Kelvin Scottish ceased trading as a stand-alone subsidiary. However, the merger involved harmonising conditions of service for employees, and whereas Kelvin had already had to impose new terms and conditions on its staff as a result of its financial problems, the changes were extremely unpopular with Central employees. Following the dismissal of four shop stewards a prolonged strike by 700 of the companies' drivers took place during 1989, which further weakened the finances of the Kelvin Central company and brought about further service cuts and the closure of the former Central depots at East Kilbride and Wishaw.

== Subsequent history ==
As part of the privatisation of Scottish Bus Group, Kelvin Central Buses was sold to its employees in February 1991 in a management buyout. In 1994, Kelvin Central was taken over by Strathclyde Buses, which was itself bought out by FirstGroup two years later. Kelvin Central was renamed to First Glasgow (No.2) Ltd. in May 1998, with a red livery adopted. Its operations are now part of First Glasgow.

In 1995-96 the depots at Stepps, Kirkintilloch and Old Kilpatrick all closed as the operation of routes into the city were consolidated at the former Strathclyde Buses facilities and most of the outlying services were surrendered to independent operators. Cumbernauld depot was also closed by FirstGroup in 2013, but it was subsequently purchased by Stagecoach and reopened in 2016 to replace Stagecoach Glasgow's Blochairn depot.

== Branding and promotions ==
The company initially adopted a simple two-tone blue livery with a logo incorporating the Flag of Scotland and the words "Scottish" and "Kelvin"; a more striking livery consisting of two lighter shades of blue and yellow applied diagonally was introduced in September 1985. This was revised in early 1988 to yellow and light blue with a dark blue diagonal stripe. Following the merger in 1989 Kelvin Central Buses adopted the former Central Scottish 'Lanarkshire Bus' red and cream livery.

As a result of increased competition in Dunbartonshire following deregulation, Kelvin decided to introduce additional fleetnames to its vehicles to establish local identities. From April 1987 onwards Dumbarton BUS appeared on vehicles operating in Dumbarton and Loch Lomondside. In October Kirkie BUS was introduced onto Kirkintilloch-based vehicles and Cumbernauld's Buses onto vehicles stationed in that town.

In 1988 a new fares scheme, the Glasgow Gold Card, was introduced, offering weekly travel on all SBG routes in the city. A Kelvin AEC Routemaster bus was painted in a gold livery to advertise the ticket, and remained in the livery until withdrawal by Kelvin Central in 1991.

== Fleet ==
The fleet acquired by Kelvin at its formation was very mixed, reflecting the different vehicle policies of its predecessor companies. Of the 381 vehicles in the initial fleet, 135 were double-deck, mostly Daimler and Leyland Fleetlines and MCW Metrobuses, together with twelve Dennis Dominators and eight Leyland Olympians. Of the single-deckers, the most numerous were 153 Leyland Leopards, while other types were the Leyland National, Leyland Tiger and Seddon Pennine 7. This mix of vehicles included various types which Kelvin's management did not consider suitable for the firm's predominantly urban operations, and vehicle swaps were arranged with several other Scottish Bus Group subsidiaries. In exchange for more Leyland Nationals with (relatively) wide doors and low floor heights, Kelvin disposed of some of its Leyland Leopard and Tiger service buses with higher floors and narrow doorways, along with coaches and dual-purpose vehicles that were more suited to longer-distance routes.

A fleet of secondhand AEC Routemaster buses were purchased from London Transport in 1986 to launch the new services in competition with Strathclyde Buses. The Routemasters proved popular with both passengers and staff, and although some were disposed of following the 1987 service cuts forty of the type continued to operate into the 1990s under successor company Kelvin Central, which was one of the last operators of the type in regular service in Scotland.

Although the original fleet did not include any minibuses, forty-three new Mercedes-Benz L608D vehicles were introduced from September 1986 for the high-frequency service in central and northern Glasgow; but this did not prove profitable and was converted to full-size operation a year later, with many of the minibuses transferred to other SBG subsidiaries. Full-sized buses purchased new in 1986-87 comprised a solitary Leyland Lynx (the only one of its type in the Scottish Bus Group), ten MCW Metrobus dual-purpose double deckers for Cumbernauld to Glasgow express services and four Leyland Tiger coaches for Scottish Citylink work. Six rare Leyland-DAB Lion dual-purpose double-deckers were also ordered for delivery in 1987, but owing to the large cut in Kelvin's peak vehicle requirement their purchase was cancelled and they were instead bought by Clydeside Scottish.
