= Scottish Bus Group =

Scottish business

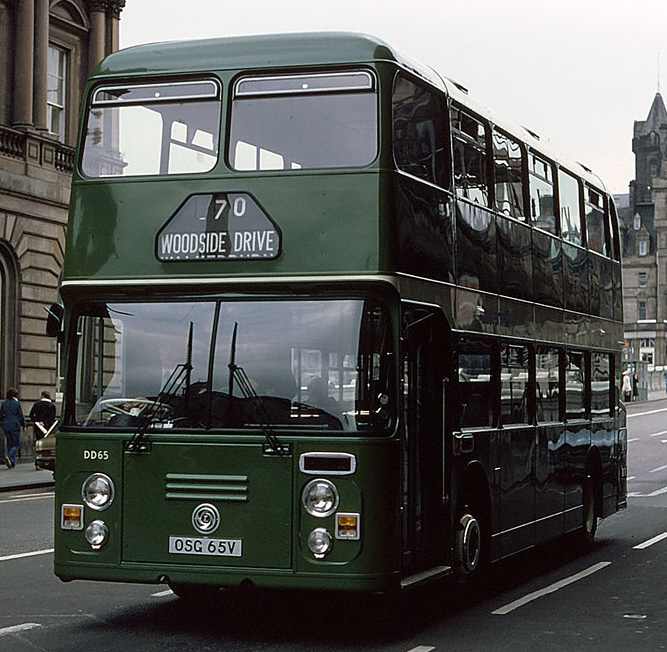
- Eastern Scottish Eastern Coach Works bodied Leyland Fleetline in September 1979
- Parent: Scottish Transport Group
- Founded: 1961
- Ceased operation: 1991
- Service area: Scotland
- Service type: Bus operator
- Fleet: 4,700 (January 1969)

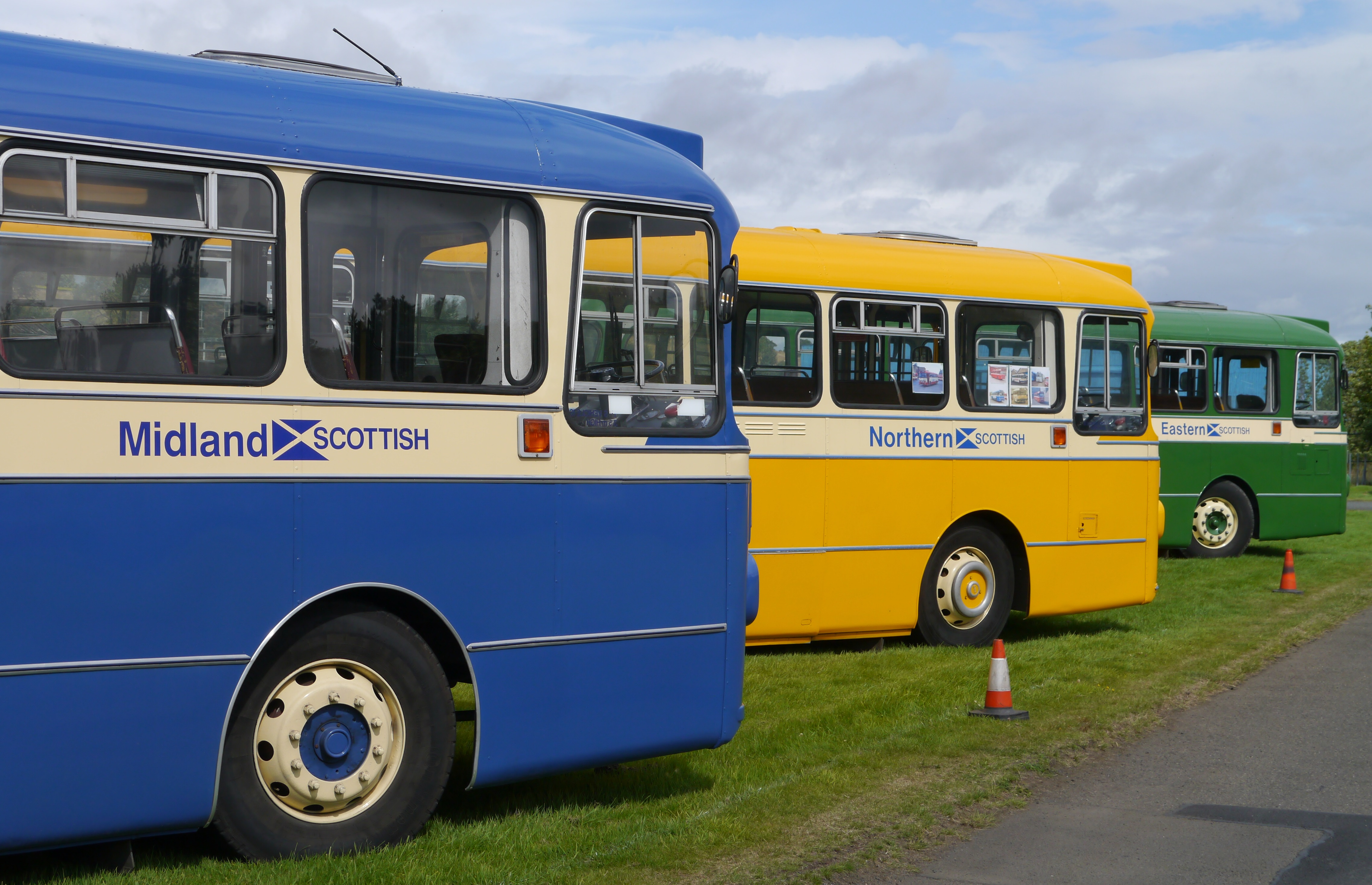
Coaches showing the unified "Midland Scottish" (blue), "Northern Scottish" (yellow) and "Eastern Scottish" (green) livery and branding styles introduced in the late 1970s.

The Scottish Bus Group (SBG) was a state-owned group of bus operators covering the whole of mainland Scotland.

The origin of the grouping was the operators owned by and including the Scottish Motor Traction company, which were transferred to Scottish Omnibuses after nationalisation in 1948 under control of the British Transport Commission. Highland Omnibuses was added to the group in 1952.

A new holding company, Scottish Omnibuses Group (Holdings) was formed in 1961, and this was renamed Scottish Bus Group in 1963. Meanwhile, the group had come under control of the Transport Holding Company in 1962 when the British Transport Commission was wound up. It went on to become part of the Scottish Transport Group on 1 January 1969 along with David MacBrayne. At the time it operated 4,700 buses.

== Member companies ==
- Central S.M.T. Company Ltd. (branded as Central Scottish from 1985)
- Highland Omnibuses Ltd.(branded as Highland Scottish from 1985)
- Scottish Omnibuses Ltd. (branded as Eastern Scottish from 1964)
- W. Alexander & Sons (Fife) Ltd. (Fife) (branded as Fife Scottish from 1985)
- W. Alexander & Sons (Midland) Ltd. (branded as Midland Scottish from 1985)
- W. Alexander & Sons (Northern) Ltd. (branded as Northern Scottish from 1985)
- Western S.M.T. Company Ltd. (branded as Western Scottish from 1985)

In 1970, SBG took over all the routes of David MacBrayne.

In 1985, SBG was restructured as follows in preparation for deregulation:

- Central Scottish Omnibuses Ltd.
- Clydeside Scottish Omnibuses Ltd.
- Eastern Scottish Omnibuses Ltd.
- Fife Scottish Omnibuses Ltd.
- Highland Scottish Omnibuses Ltd.
- Kelvin Scottish Omnibuses Ltd.
- Lowland Scottish Omnibuses Ltd.
- Midland Scottish Omnibuses Ltd.
- Northern Scottish Omnibuses Ltd.
- SBG Engineering Ltd.
- Scottish Citylink Coaches Ltd.
- Strathtay Scottish Omnibuses Ltd.
- Western Scottish Omnibuses Ltd.

In May 1988, it was decided to privatise the operating companies with this occurring in 1990/1991. Central Scottish and Kelvin Scottish were merged as Kelvin Central Buses, while Clydeside Scottish was merged into Western Scottish so as to provide a healthier prospect for potential buyers, both companies ended up being sold as separate entities.

SBG Engineering had been formed to operate the central repair workshops inherited from six of the original seven operating subsidiaries (Alexander (Northern) not having had a separate engineering works). The company undertook heavy overhauls, refurbishment and accident repairs on behalf of the operating subsidiaries, and also offered these services commercially to other operators. Latterly it also owned a small fleet of rental buses. The Larbert works was transferred to Midland Scottish in 1988 and the rest of the company was dissolved in March 1990 as a prelude to privatisation. Edinburgh and Motherwell works were closed, while Inverness, Kilmarnock and Kirkcaldy works were transferred to Highland Scottish, Western Scottish and Fife Scottish respectively

The holding company, Scottish Bus Group Limited, was dissolved in 2006.
