= Highland Scottish =

Scottish bus operator

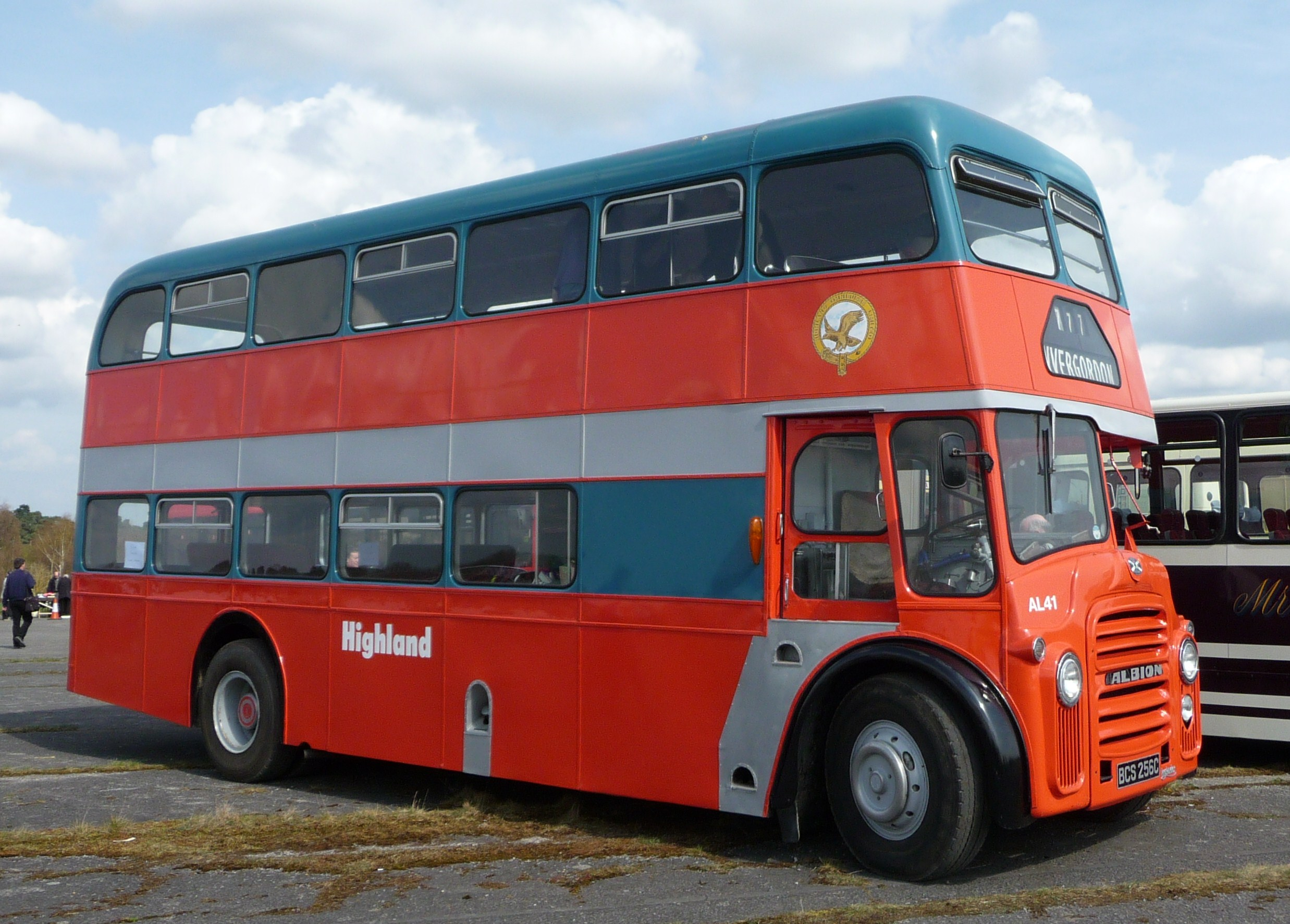
A preserved Highland Scottish Albion Lowlander

Highland Scottish Omnibuses Ltd was formed as a bus operating subsidiary of the Scottish Transport Group in June 1985 from Highland Omnibuses Ltd, and operated until October 1995 when the company was split into two - Highland Bus & Coach and Highland Country Buses. The companies have since remerged and operate today as Highland Country Buses. It is now Stagecoach Highlands.

== Background ==
From its head office in Seafield Road, Inverness, Highland Scottish operated over the massive geographical, but sparsely populated, area of the Highland region of north west Scotland.

Highland Scottish was the largest operator in north west Scotland and was responsible for urban, rural and interurban services in and around the towns of Inverness, Aviemore, Nairn, Tain, Portree, Wick, Thurso and Fort William, with depots located in these towns. Services extended to Oban in the south, and Highland also operated coaches on long distance Scottish Citylink work, linking Inverness and the north west to Glasgow, Edinburgh, Aberdeen and points in England.

Highland Scottish only operated services on the mainland. Services in the Inner and Outer Hebrides, Orkney and Shetland were operated by local independent operators.

On 16 May 2008, it was announced that the Stagecoach Group would purchase Rapson's Coaches operations of Highland Country Buses and Orkney Coaches Ltd. The sale was completed in June 2008, adding over 200 buses to the Stagecoach fleet.

== History ==
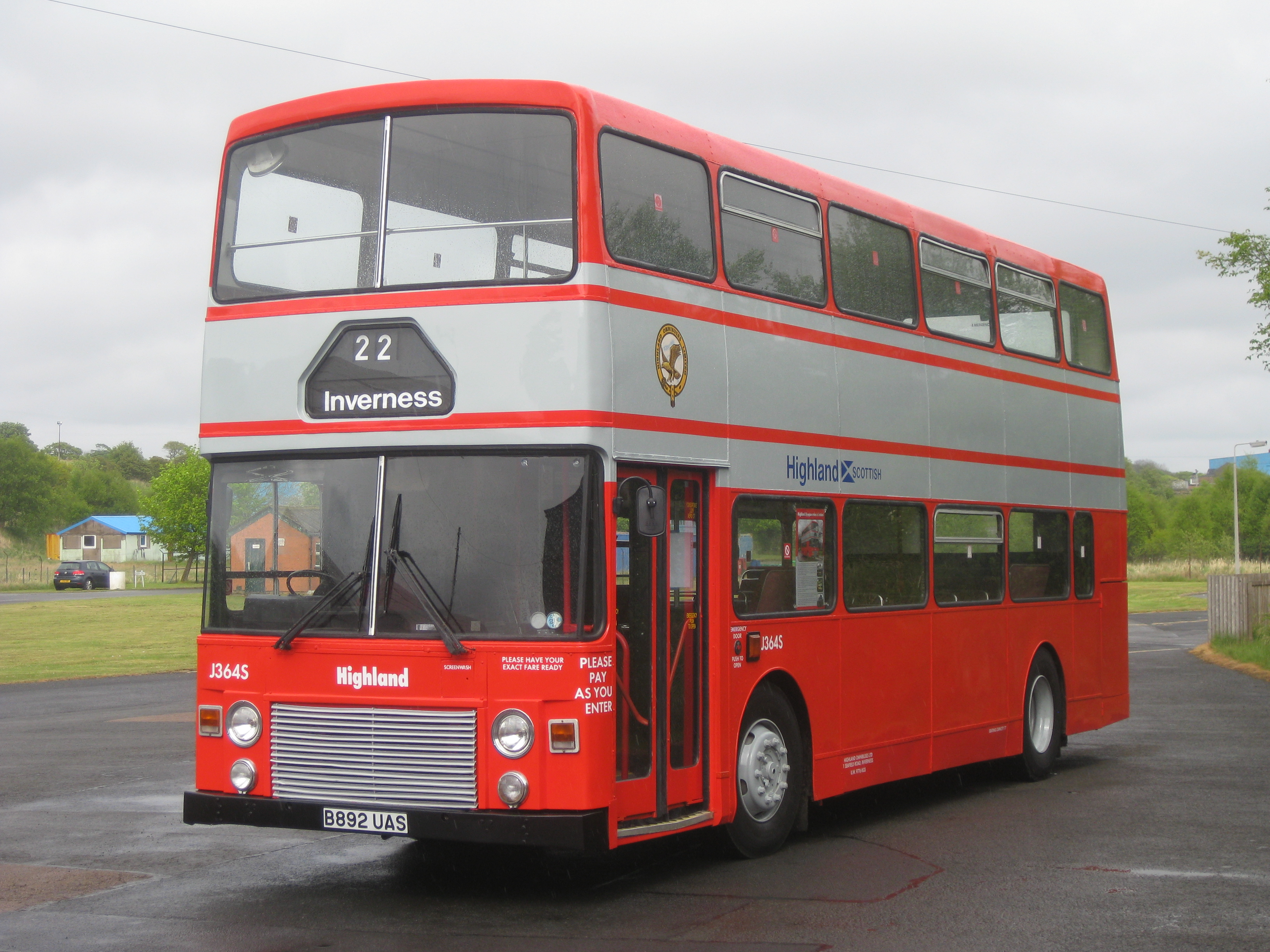
A preserved Highland Scottish Leyland Olympian

Highland Scottish can be traced back to 1952 when Highland Omnibuses was created when Highland Transport, Macrae & Dick and Alexanders Town Services in Inverness were joined together. In the reorganisation of the Scottish Bus Group, in 1985, to prepare for deregulation and privatisation, the company was renamed Highland Scottish Omnibuses Ltd. Unlike many of the original SBG subsidiaries, Highland's operating area remained largely unchanged. No additional territory was gained, but Oban was transferred to Midland Scottish. The red and grey livery used by Highland Omnibuses was retained for the fleet.

Initially, upon deregulation, Highland continued to enjoy the monopoly position across much of its operating area. Competition started around Fort William with the arrival of a new company, Gaelic Bus, owned by Alexander MacConnacher, Brecklet, Ballachulish. However, it was the competition in the biggest town in the Highland Scottish network that was to prove controversial.

Highland Scottish was the sole operator in Inverness and provided all bus services in and around the town. However, in May 1988, a group of ex-Highland drivers formed Inverness Traction Ltd, operating a fleet of leased minibuses and operating in parallel to Highland's Inverness network. Highland's response to the competition was to cut fare levels well below the competition and increasing bus frequencies levels by 60%. Both companies suffered acute financial losses during the competition period, which ended when Inverness Traction went into receivership in April 1989.

The services operated by Inverness Traction, and the minibus leases, were immediately taken up by an Aberdeen-based coach operator, Alexanders (North East) Ltd. However, the intense competition continued and Alexanders also fell into receivership in November 1989. After a brief interval, the assets and services of Inverness Traction were purchased by the Stagecoach Group, resulting in Highland scaling down the level of service against the new operator. Soon after, Stagecoach would purchase the Inverness and Tain operations of Highland Scottish and become the dominant operator of Inverness area services.

In August 1991, Highland Scottish was sold to a consortium made up of Rapson's Coaches, a coach operator based near Inverness, and Clansman Travel and Leisure, the holding company for Scottish Citylink, which had recently been purchased from the Scottish Bus Group through a management and employee buyout, for £800,000. In March 1993, ownership of Highland Scottish passed wholly to Rapson's. However, in October 1995, the company was split in two, with Rapson's retaining the eastern services under Highland Bus & Coach Ltd, with the remainder passed to a new company, Highland Country Buses Ltd. Highland Scottish Omnibuses at that time ceased to exist as a whole concern.

Highland Scottish remains as the trading name of Inverness bus station.

== Successor companies ==
Highland Country buses adopted a starkly different livery to the traditional red by going for a two-tone blue livery, with a large St Andrew's Cross in the centre of its 'Highland Country' logo. In January 1996 Highland Country Buses was bought by National Express for £1.8m. Highland Bus & Coach, being the smaller of the two operators, continued to operate with the image its predecessor adopted. The two companies continued to exist under separate ownership until August 1998 when Rapson's bought Highland Country Buses back from National Express for £4m - £2.2m more than Rapson's originally sold the company for. Highland Country Buses is now a wholly owned subsidiary of Rapson's Coaches, and covers the operating area that Highland Scottish had on privatisation. The company has adopted a 'corporate look', sharing the two-tone blue with silver trim livery that Rapson's Coaches used, with the addition of the large golden eagle logo at the rear of the vehicle. While regular bus services trade as Highland Country, longer distance, express and private contract work operate under the Rapson's name. In March 2005, Rapson's completed its take over of the Orkney Islands bus market with the acquisition of four separate bus companies on the islands, including the largest, James D. Peace & Shalder Coaches. The Orcadian operation trades as Orkney Coaches and remains a separate subsidiary to Highland. All operations are now part of the Stagecoach Group.

== See also ==
- List of bus operators of the United Kingdom
