= Central Scottish =

Scottish bus operating company

Central Scottish Omnibuses Ltd was a bus operating subsidiary of the Scottish Transport Group formed in June 1985 from Central SMT, and operated until July 1989 when it was merged with Kelvin Scottish to form Kelvin Central Buses.

== Operation ==
From its head office in Traction House, Motherwell, Central Scottish had an operating area covering the whole of Lanarkshire, bounded by Glasgow to the west, Airdrie to the north, Strathaven to the south and Shotts to the east.

Central was the largest operator in central Scotland and was responsible for local and interurban services in the towns of East Kilbride, Airdrie, Motherwell, Wishaw and Hamilton. Depots were also located in these towns.

Central Scottish also provided coaches for Scottish Citylink work, mainly from Glasgow and central Scotland to other points in Scotland.

== History ==
Scottish Motor Traction (SMT) was founded in Edinburgh in 1905, and expanded rapidly. After World War I, this expansion included the acquisition of bus companies operating in other parts of Scotland. In 1928 SMT was purchased by the London, Midland & Scottish Railway (LMS) and the London & North Eastern Railway, and became the parent company for railway-owned bus operations in Scotland. Central SMT was a product of this series of acquisitions and mergers.

In 1926 the Glasgow General Omnibus and Motor Services Ltd. was formed. This company, which traded as the 'Glasgow Omnibus Company' (GOC) developed a network of bus services radiating out from Glasgow into Lanarkshire, as well as an isolated group of services along the north bank of the River Clyde to western Dunbartonshire. In 1930, GOC was purchased by the LMS. In the same year, the LMS. also purchased two further major Lanarkshire bus firms, Stewart and McDonald of Carluke, and JW & R Torrance of Hamilton. Several smaller firms were subsequently purchased and absorbed by these companies.

In 1932, control of the LMS' bus interests in Scotland was vested in the SMT Group. The three Lanarkshire firms were merged into one new company, named the Central SMT Company Ltd. At the same time, the SMT Group purchased the Lanarkshire Traction Company Ltd., of Motherwell. Lanarkshire Traction, which had originally been a tramway operator, became a subsidiary of Central SMT. The head office of both companies was the former Lanarkshire Traction premises at Traction House, Motherwell. Throughout the 1930s, Central purchased and absorbed numerous smaller companies, notable amongst which were Baillie Brothers of Dumbarton and Clydebank Motors of Clydebank. These two firms were acquired in 1936, which strengthened the company's position in western Dunbartonshire.

Nationalisation of the railways in 1948 made the state the major shareholder in the SMT group of companies, and the group was itself fully nationalised in 1949. At that time, some of the group's smaller subsidiaries were wound up, including Lanarkshire Traction, which was fully absorbed by Central SMT. By this time, Central was firmly established as the dominant bus operator in Lanarkshire and western Dunbartonshire. This dominant position was furthered by the takeover of John Laurie and Company of Hamilton in 1961. During this period, Central was consistently the most profitable company in the Scottish Bus Group. From the late 1970s, the trading name of the company became 'Central Scottish'.

== Deregulation and the formation of Central Scottish Omnibuses ==
In preparation for deregulation of the bus industry in 1986, and the eventual break up and privatisation of the group, the Scottish Bus Group restructured its subsidiary companies in 1985. As part of this, Central SMT was renamed Central Scottish Omnibuses. The Dunbartonshire and north Glasgow operations became part of a new company, Kelvin Scottish Omnibuses Ltd., but Central gained the former Eastern Scottish operations in the Monklands area of Lanarkshire.

On deregulation Central, together with fellow SBG subsidiaries Clydeside Scottish and Kelvin Scottish, launched a revised network of services within the city of Glasgow in direct competition with the city operator, Strathclyde Buses. A high profile, high frequency cross city service, together with a number of minibus services were started, though Strathclyde Buses retaliated by extending their own network deep into Lanarkshire. Whereas Strathclyde Buses services into East Kilbride and beyond proved popular at Central's expense, Central's city services failed to gain popularity and often ran empty.

In the face of growing competition, it was announced that Central Scottish would be merged with Kelvin Scottish in an attempt to make the larger company more attractive to potential buyers. However, the planned merger was deeply unpopular with Central's staff, as flexible rostering agreements, fully in place with Kelvin, had not yet been implemented at Central. This resulted in a disastrous strike in early 1989, and the company's network was paralysed for weeks on end. While Central's buses remained in their depots, Strathclyde Buses and a number of independent operators stepped in and took over much of the company's route network. By summer 1989, the dispute had ended, and in a vain attempt to win back customers, Central embarked on a major rebranding exercise. The Central Scottish trading name and the deep red and cream livery the vehicles wore gave way to a number of new local identities. Vehicles in Airdrie received a dark blue and grey colour scheme branded as Monklands Bus, East Kilbride vehicles gained a dark green and cream livery with EK Chieftain fleetnames, leaving vehicles in the remaining depots gaining a more vibrant red and cream livery, branded as Lanarkshire Bus. The Central Scottish identity was buried with the strike action, and the company was renamed Kelvin Central Buses in preparation for the merger. However, a significant retrenchment of the company's operations followed.

In July 1989, the merger between the two companies was fully enacted, and Central Scottish ceased trading as an independent concern. Kelvin Central Buses was later privatised by sale to its employees, who later sold the firm to Strathclyde Buses, before it in turn was purchased by First Glasgow. However, many of the former Central routes have been surrendered to independent operators. The last remaining former Central garage, Airbles in Motherwell, closed in 2007.

== Depots and works ==
Central SMT and Central Scottish operated from the following depots:

- Airbles depot, Motherwell (opened 1962, closed by First Glasgow 2007 when replaced by a new facility in Blantyre);
- Burnbank depot, Hamilton (closed 1962, replaced by Airbles)
- Carluke depot (closed in 1976)
- Clarkston depot, Airdrie (ex Scottish Omnibuses in 1985, closed by First Glasgow);
- Clydesdale depot, Hamilton (closed April 1988)
- East Kilbride (original small depot replaced by a new depot in 1956, once SBG's most profitable depot, but closed by Kelvin Central Buses in December 1990);
- Gavinburn depot, Old Kilpatrick (opened 1936 to replace various small outstations, passed to Kelvin Scottish 1985, closed by Kelvin Central Buses May 1996)
- Harthill depot (closed in 1962 as part of a minor re-organisation of services between Central SMT and Scottish Omnibuses);
- Muirkirk depot (a small outstation of Carluke, closed in the 1970s)
- Traction House, Motherwell (replaced as depot by neighbouring Airbles in 1962, but retained as head office and central works. Closed by Kelvin Central Buses);
- Wishaw (closed by Kelvin Central Buses December 1990)

== The fleet ==
At its formation in 1932, Central SMT inherited a varied collection of vehicles. However, Leyland quickly became the preferred supplier for new buses. Although there were also some Albions, new buses purchased in the 1930s mainly comprised Leyland Lion, Tiger and Titan models, including a number of secondhand Titans. During World War II, when Leylands were not available, the fleet received a rare (for Scotland) Bristol K, as well as the ubiquitous utility Guy Arabs and Daimler CWs.

Between the end of the war and the early 1960s, Central overwhelmingly favoured double deckers. Some pre-war Leyland Tigers were rebodied as such in the late 1940s (notably including some 3-axle Tiger TS7T chassis which were rebuilt to 2-axle Titan TD4 specification). New Leyland Titans continued to be bought until 1960, but the first Bristol Lodekkas arrived in 1955 and soon became the preferred choice, the last new examples being delivered in 1967. Other double deckers bought in this period were a solitary AEC Regent in 1946, some Guy Arab IIIs in 1951–52, and Albion Lowlanders in 1962–63. The takeover of Laurie of Hamilton brought an assortment of Leyland Titans (including former London Transport RTLs), and a rebodied Guy Arab, but most notable were a pair of early Leyland Atlanteans. These were the first rear-engined double deckers to operate for the Scottish Bus Group.

Central tried various types, of rear engined double deckers, but found that none were to their satisfaction, and double deckers declined as a proportion of the fleet. The Atlanteans were sold in 1969, and a prototype Bristol VRX, operated from 1966, was returned to the manufacturer when a batch of 20 Bristol VRTs arrived, also in 1969. The VRT was not popular in Scottish Bus Group fleets, and all were sold to the National Bus Company in exchange for late-model Lodekkas in the early 1970s. A batch of 35 Daimler Fleetlines was delivered in 1971, but these were exchanged for single deck Leyland Leopards from other SBG companies in 1975. However, Volvo Ailsa B55s (30 purchased in 1978–79) and Dennis Dominators (51 in 1978–83) eventually found favour. When Central inherited Scottish Omnibuses' Airdrie operations in 1985, the Fleetlines and Leyland Olympians based there were not wanted by Central and were retained by Eastern Scottish. However, the last double deckers purchased by Central were in fact 10 Leyland Olympians, delivered in 1986.

Relatively few single deckers were purchased in the 1940s and 1950s. There were Leyland Tigers and Guy Arab IIIs in the late 1940s/early 1950s, followed by some Guy Arab UFs. The first Leyland Leopards first arrived in 1961, but a milestone was the delivery of the first batch of Leopard PSU3 models in 1964. With 53 seats, a standee Leopard had almost as many seats as an early-postwar double decker, and they quickly became the standard Central SMT bus. By 1983 some 400 Leopards had been purchased new, as well as a number of secondhand examples from within the SBG. After the Leopards, Central standardised on the Leyland Tiger, with 83 buses delivered between 1982 and 1987. There were also 45 Leyland Nationals in 1978-81 and 15 Dennis Dorchesters in 1983–84. Additional Leyland Nationals and some Seddon Pennine 7s were inherited with Airdrie depot.

A small dedicated coach fleet was maintained intermittently. Between 1955 until 1978 Bedfords with Duple coachwork were bought (along with five Albion Vikings in 1966, which were quickly transferred to Highland Omnibuses). The last Bedfords were sold in the early '80s, and for a time there were no coaches. However, in 1984 a secondhand Leyland Tiger coach and a former Western SMT Seddon Pennine 7 which had been fitted with a wheelchair lift arrived, and five of the Dennis Dorchesters delivered that year were to coach specification. A second Leyland Tiger coach was inherited from Scottish Omnibuses' Airdrie fleet, and some of the Airdrie Seddons also had coach bodywork. Two Volvo B10Ms were acquired from Newton of Dingwall in 1985, and 10 new Tigers coaches were bought in 1986–87.

A few minibuses were operated from the early 1970s onwards. These were successively Bedford VAS, Ford A-series and Leyland Cubs. In 1986–87, a fleet of 31 Dodge S56s were purchased for competitive services in the south of Glasgow.

Even within the Scottish Bus Group, Central had a reputation for conservatism in its vehicle specifications. Examples of this included:

- the specification of cutaway rear entrances on some of the underfloor-engined Guy Arab UFs, when front or central entrances were far more common for such buses;
- the continued purchase of PD1 model Leyland Titans after most other operators had switched to the more advanced PD2, and later of PD2 models when other SBG subsidiaries had gone over to the larger PD3 model;
- the early disposal of successive models of rear-engined double-deckers in the 1960s and 1970s;
- continuing to specify manual synchromesh gearboxes on its Leyland Leopards until 1979, by which time automatic gearboxes were the norm across most of the UK bus industry.
