= Scottish Omnibuses =

Defunct bus operator in Scotland

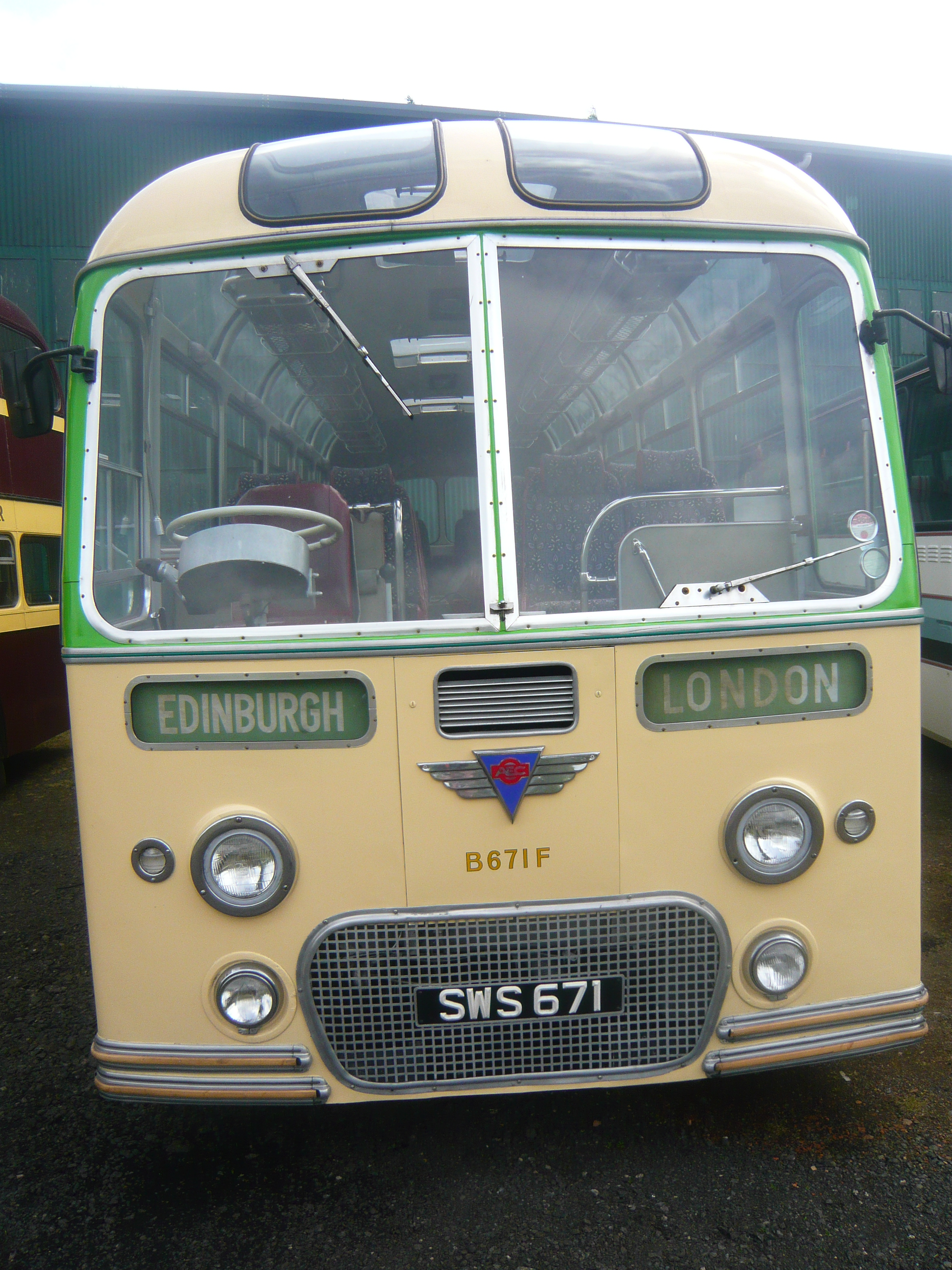
A Scottish Omnibuses express coach preserved in the Scottish Vintage Bus Museum

Scottish Omnibuses Ltd. (SOL) was a company set up by the British Transport Commission on 4 April 1949 to take over the bus and coach operations of Scottish Motor Traction (SMT) and its subsidiaries under the nationalisation provisions of the Transport Act 1947. SMT itself remained in private hands, continuing its motor sales, service and insurance businesses. SOL took over the holding of SMT's former subsidiary companies, while those buses and coaches it operated directly continued to use the SMT brand until the early 1960s, when, after a brief flirtation with "Scottish", the fleet name "Eastern Scottish" was adopted.

In 1961 the holding function of SOL was transferred to a new company Scottish Omnibuses Group (Holdings) Ltd, which, following the demise of the British Transport Commission, came under the control of the state-owned Transport Holding Company the following year. It was renamed as Scottish Bus Group Ltd. in 1963, and became part of the Scottish Transport Group in 1969 following the addition of ferry services.

SOL itself remained as a bus and coach operator in south-east Scotland, trading as Eastern Scottish, until reorganisation of the group in 1985, when it was split into Eastern Scottish Omnibuses Ltd. and Lowland Scottish Omnibuses Ltd. Following privatisation these were eventually re-united in 1999 under the banner of First Edinburgh.
