= John Ord (police officer) =

Scottish police man, folk song collector, antiquarian

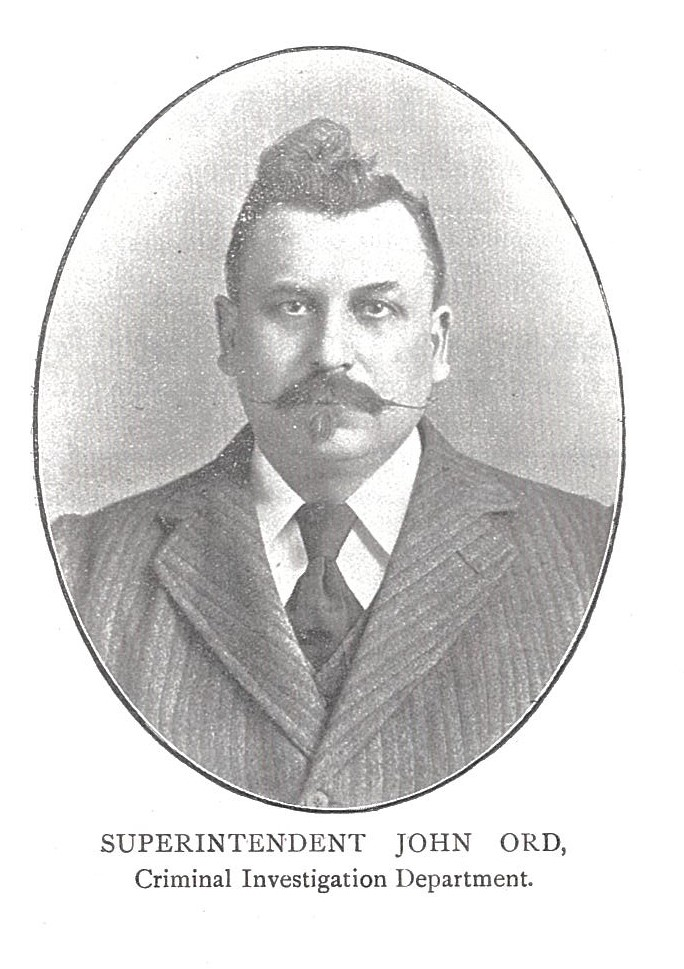
- Born: 1861; King Edward, Aberdeenshire
- Died: 1928 (aged 66–67); Glasgow
- Occupation: Police Officer
- Employer: Glasgow Police
- Known for: Antiquarianism

John Ord (1861 - 1928) was a police officer, antiquarian and folk song collector from Glasgow.

== Family and life ==
John Ord was born in King Edward, Aberdeenshire, the son of a farm labourer. He travelled to Glasgow and became a probationary constable in Glasgow Police in 1880.

== Police career ==
His first posting was St Rollox division. In 1888 he was promoted to the post of sergeant, and then detective officer, in 1891. He was eventually appointed as the Superintendent of the Southern Division of the Glasgow Police Force.

He was involved in the investigation of the 1908 murder case against Oscar Slater, which resulted in a miscarriage of justice.

He received the King’s Police Medal in 1914. He retired from the force in 1925.

== Collector ==
Ord was interested in history and collected folk-songs and ballads.

== Old Glasgow Club ==
The Old Glasgow Club, a male only club, was formed in 1900 to preserve the history of the city of Glasgow.

In 1908, Ord, who was a member, proposed that ladies be admitted to the membership of the club. The motion was carried by 30 votes to 22.

Dreda Boyd, who was introduced to the club by her uncle Sir John Stirling-Maxwell, was one of the first three lady members, alongside Helen C. Girvan and Mrs Mason.

== Glasgow Police Museum ==
Ord founded the first Glasgow Police Museum, initially in the Casualty Surgeon's waiting room in the Central Police Office. It then moved to the South Police Office, Oxford Street, and then 21 St. Andrew's Street until it was absorbed into the Strathclyde Police Museum. The Glasgow Police Museum now replaces it.

== Family ==
Ord's brother was Hugh Ord, the curator of the People's Palace, Glasgow.

Ord's daughter was Agnes McLaren Lockhart, the first female president of the Old Glasgow Club.

== Publications ==
- Ord, John. (1906) Origin and history of the Glasgow police force (Glasgow: [Aird & Coghill Ltd.?]) [paper delivered to the Old Glasgow Club on 20th March, 1906, in the Court Hall of the Old Central Police Office, Albion Street, to commemorate the removal of the Police Headquarters to the new premises in St. Andrew's Square]
- Ord, John. (1910) The wastage of youth (Glasgow: Aird & Coghill Ltd.) [paper delivered to the Educational Institute of Scotland, on 18th February, 1910, in the Hall of the Royal Philosophical Society, 2017 Bath Street, Glasgow]
- Ord, John. (1912) History of the Burgh of Calton (Glasgow: Aird & Coghill Ltd.)
- Ord, John. (1919) The detention and punishment of crime past and present
- Ord, John. (1919) The story of the Barony of Gorbals
- Members of the Glasgow Ballad Club. (1920) Ballads and folk-songs of the Clyde valley (Glasgow: John Smith & Son)
- Ord, John. (1922) Some local superstitions (Glasgow: Aird & Coghill Ltd.) [read before the Old Glasgow Club, 15th December, 1921]
- Some (additional) Glasgow songs and song writers : a lecture given to the members of the Old Glasgow Club on 14th April, 1927
- Fenton, Alexander, introduction. (1990) Ord's Bothy Songs and Ballads of Aberdeen, Banff and Moray, Angus and the Mearns (Edinburgh: John Donald Publishers Ltd)
