= Strathclyde Buses =

Bus operator in Glasgow and West Scotland

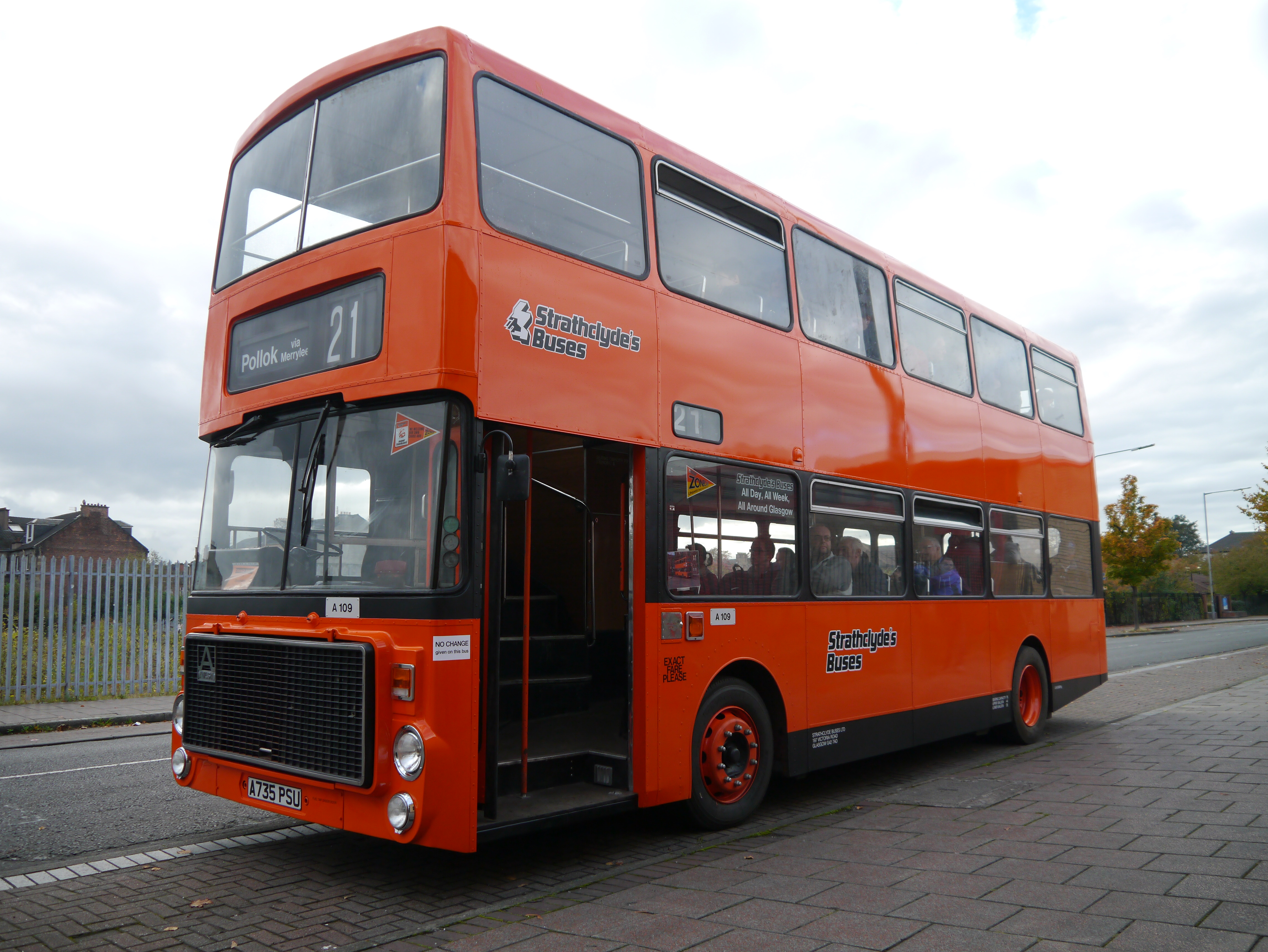
- Preserved Alexander bodied Volvo Ailsa B55 in Govan in October 2014
- Founded: October 1986; 39 years ago
- Defunct: May 1996; 29 years ago
- Headquarters: Larkfield, Victoria Road, Glasgow
- Service area: Strathclyde
- Service type: Bus
- Depots: 4
- Fleet: 740 (October 1986)

Strathclyde Buses was a bus operator running services in Glasgow and west-central Scotland. The company commenced operations in October 1986 as an 'arm's-length' successor to the Strathclyde Regional Council-owned Strathclyde Passenger Transport Executive (Strathclyde PTE). In 1996, Strathclyde Buses was taken over by FirstBus, and the company trades today as First Glasgow.

== History ==
=== Formation ===
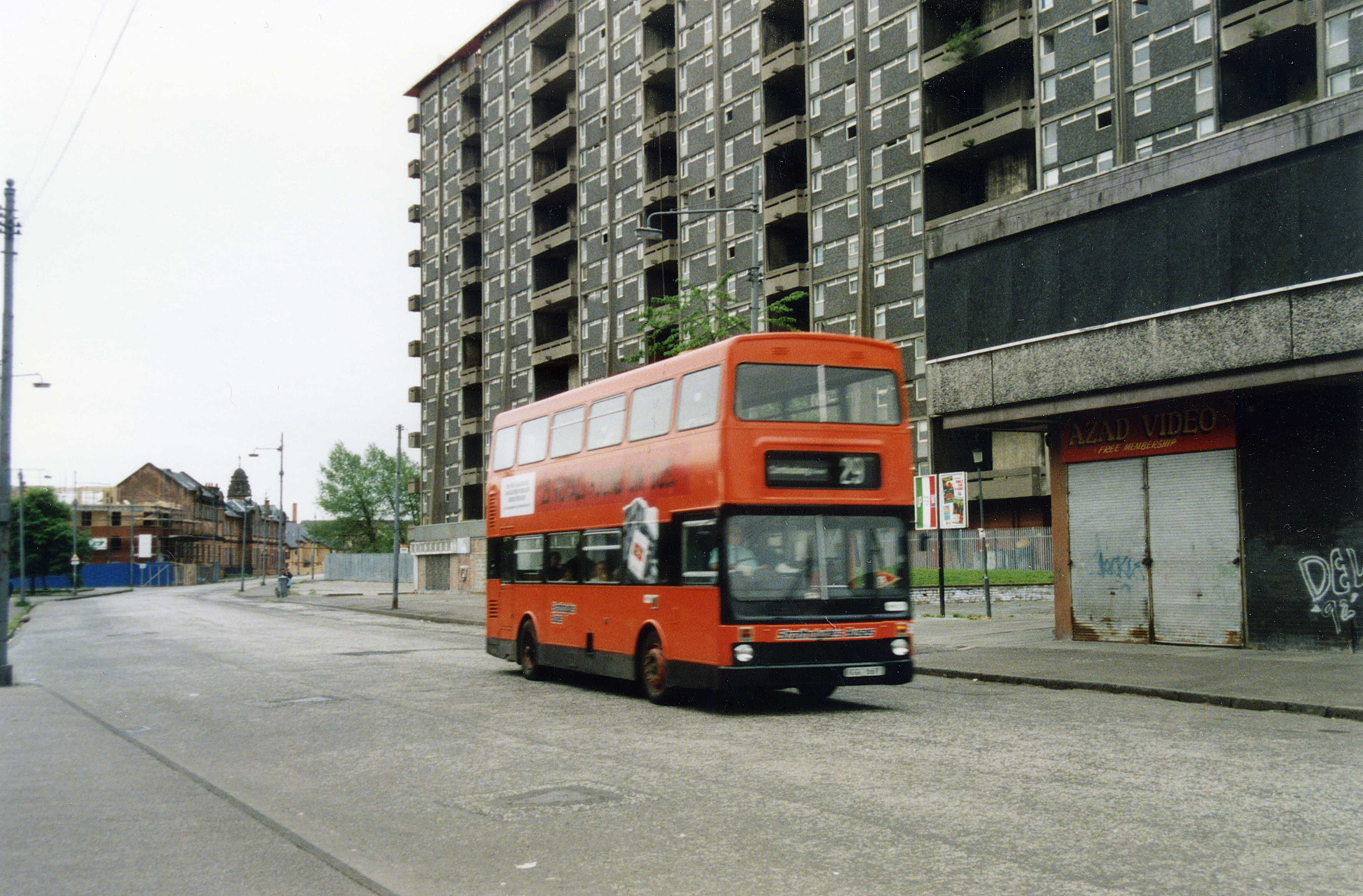
MCW Metrobus passing the Queen Elizabeth Flats in 1993

Strathclyde Buses was created in October 1986 as an 'arm's-length' successor of the council-owned Strathclyde PTE, inheriting most of its fleet of nearly 800 vehicles from the former PTE. A black and orange livery introduced by the PTE in 1983 was used on the majority of the company's buses; single-deck vehicles, which made up less than 1% of the fleet, were painted in a similar livery which also included white.

At its creation, the company operated from four garages in Larkfield, which also served as the company's headquarters, Possilpark, Parkhead and Knightswood. Garages at Gartcraig and Newlands had been closed in July 1986 by SPTE with a loss of around 200 jobs, and in total, up to 600 jobs had been lost at the PTE in preparation for the deregulation of bus services on 26 October 1986.

Prior to the creation of Strathclyde Buses and the onset of deregulation, Strathclyde PTE brought its deregulated network to the market in August 1986, running services to areas served by surrounding Scottish Bus Group (SBG) units, Central Scottish, Clydeside Scottish and Kelvin Scottish, including East Kilbride, Cumbernauld, Balloch and Johnstone. In retaliation, the SBG units began operating services duplicating Strathclyde's own using fleets of AEC Routemasters and minibuses, sparking an early bus war and causing heavy traffic congestion throughout Glasgow city centre. Following a public inquiry held by the Scottish Traffic Commissioner into particularly heavy bus congestion on 11 October, no action was taken against either operator to reduce traffic levels in Glasgow city centre.

=== Management buyout ===
On 18 May 1992, sixty buses and coaches were destroyed in an overnight fire at Strathclyde's Larkfield depot and headquarters. Services were affected for two days, with the destroyed buses and coaches replaced initially by vehicles hired in from operators such as Grampian Regional Transport, Tayside Regional Transport, Western Scottish, Busways Travel Services and Nottingham City Transport, as well as vehicles sourced from Strathclyde's three other garages, before these were replaced by 52 new Alexander bodied Leyland Olympians, the last of the type built at Leyland Bus factory in Workington.

After a previous deal negotiated between a Strathclyde Buses management-employee team and the council had been rejected by Secretary of State for Scotland Ian Lang, a revised deal presented the following November the company saw Strathclyde Buses sold to a £30.6 million (equivalent to £65,853,000 in 2025) management-employee buy-out by Strathclyde Regional Council, beating competing bids from Stagecoach Holdings and forming a holding company named SB Holdings (SBH). A low-cost operation named GCT was set up following the buyout in 1993, using older Strathclyde Buses vehicles in a new livery of green and yellow, followed in October 1994 by the takeover of former SBG subsidiary Kelvin Central Buses (KCB), formed from the former Kelvin Scottish and Central Scottish operations. KCB, who had purchased Stagecoach's Glasgow Magicbus operation in April 1992 as the latter prepared to bid for Strathclyde Buses, was retained as a separate operating subsidiary of SB Holdings.

=== Sale to FirstBus ===
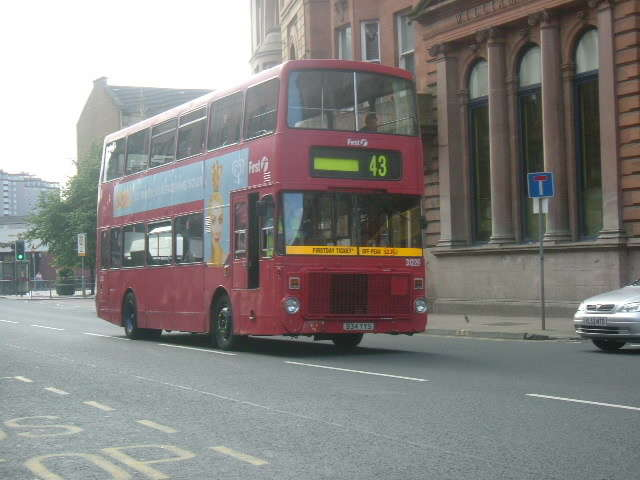
First Glasgow Alexander bodied Volvo Ailsa B55 in Bridgeton in 2005

In December 1994, Stagecoach Holdings bought 21.7% of the shares in SB Holdings and a place on the company board, a deal worth £8.3 million (equivalent to £17,513,000 in 2025) that also saw a fleet of 18 Alexander PS type bodied Volvo B10Ms acquired from Stagecoach's Western Scottish operations. However, a subsequent investigation by the Monopolies and Mergers Commission (MMC) concluded that Stagecoach should divest the stake and give up their board seat, ruling that its ownership of both Western Scottish and SB Holdings would give Stagecoach an overly dominant market share of Glasgow's bus network. Stagecoach intended to appeal the ruling, but before this could take place, an offer to purchase SB Holdings was made by FirstBus.

SB Holdings, which by now owned 1,300 vehicles and employed over 2,000 staff members, was bought by FirstBus in May 1996 for £110 million (equivalent to £220,796,000 in 2025), making FirstBus the largest bus operating company in the United Kingdom. This takeover was reviewed by the MMC due to concerns that FirstBus would have a monopoly of services in Glasgow, but was eventually cleared in the summer of 1998 after the introduction of additional competing services by Stagecoach. Strathclyde Buses had been renamed to First Glasgow earlier in the year.

== Fleet ==
Upon its creation from Strathclyde PTE in October 1986, Strathclyde Buses operated a fleet of 740 buses and coaches. Strathclyde Buses relied heavily on the Alexander bodied Leyland Atlantean bus, having inherited over 400 at its creation, as well as the Volvo Ailsa B55, of which over 150 were operated.

Between 1988 and 1989, the company took delivery of 95 Volvo Citybuses with Alexander bodywork, as well as 25 MCW Metrobuses, the latter of which were caught amid Metro Cammell Weymann's bankruptcy proceedings. A small single-deck fleet was also operated, with a fleet of 90 MCW Metrorider minibuses inherited from Strathclyde PTE branded 'Wee Happy Buses' for use in suburban Glasgow, as well as three rare Caetano-bodied Volvo B10Ms.
