= First Glasgow =

Bus operator in Greater Glasgow, Scotland

First Greater Glasgow

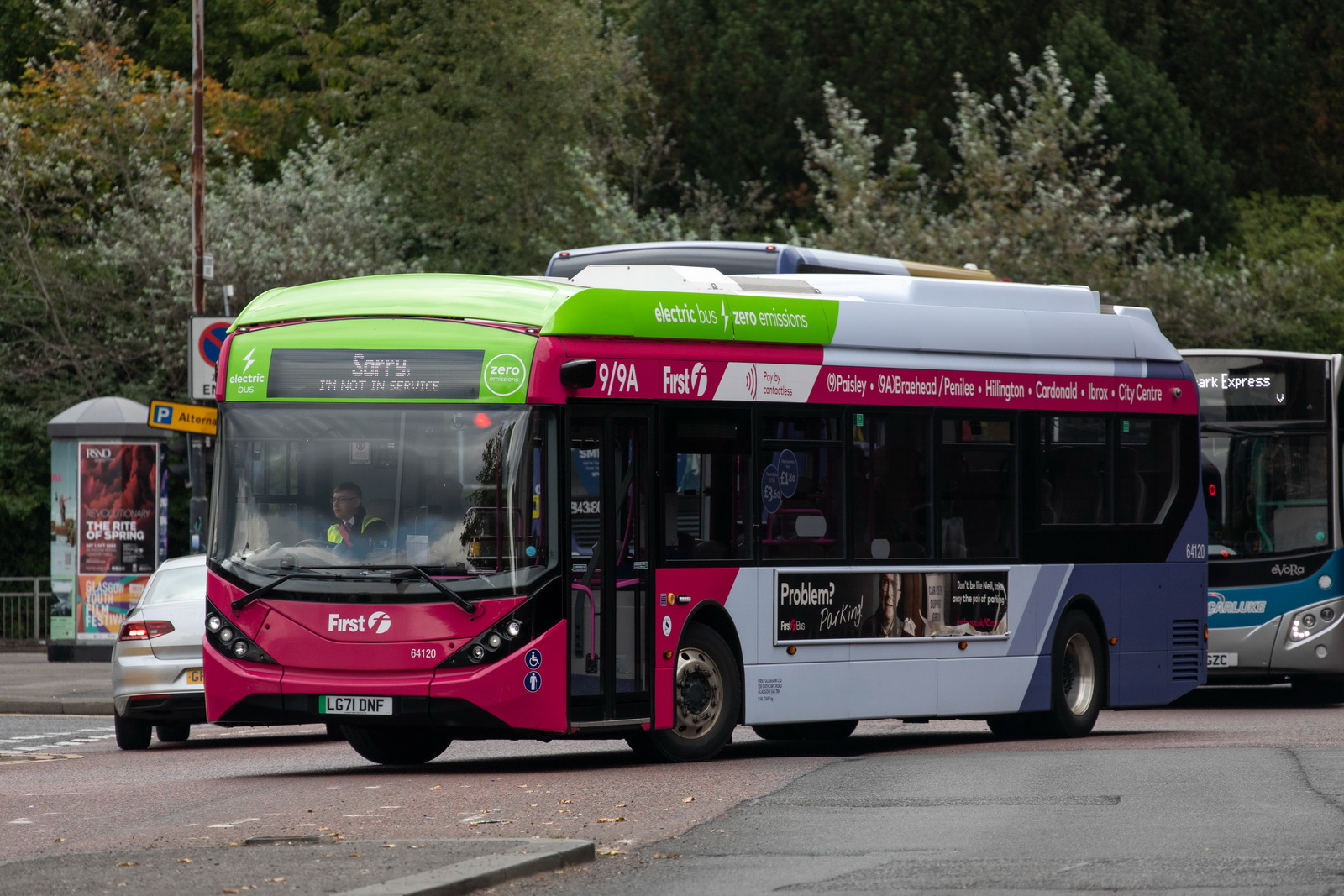
- BYD Alexander Dennis Enviro200EV in Glasgow city centre in September 2022
- Parent: FirstGroup
- Founded: May 1996
- Headquarters: Glasgow
- Locale: Greater Glasgow
- Service area: Glasgow; Blantyre; Scotstoun; Overtown; Dumbarton
- Service type: Bus services
- Routes: 85
- Fleet: 690 (July 2025)
- Fuel type: Diesel, Electric
- Website: firstbus.co.uk/greater-glasgow

First Glasgow is the largest bus company serving the Greater Glasgow area in Scotland. It is a subsidiary of FirstGroup. The company operates within the area covered by the Strathclyde Partnership for Transport, a public body responsible for helping to co-ordinate public transport services in the Greater Glasgow area.

== History ==
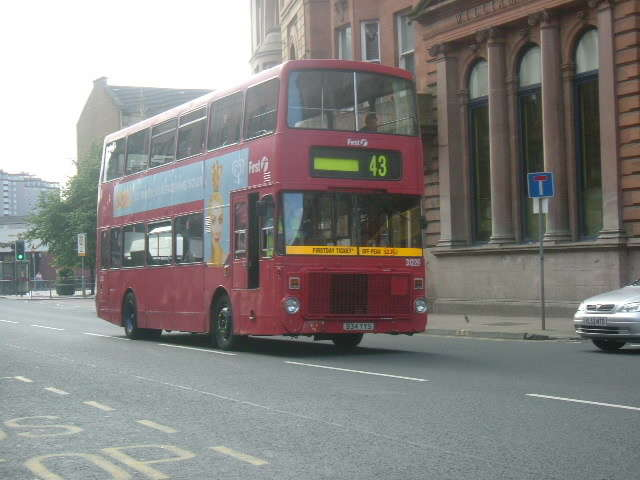
A First Glasgow Volvo Ailsa B55 in Bridgeton in 2005

First Glasgow was created through FirstGroup's buyout of Strathclyde Buses (created from the former Greater Glasgow Passenger Transport Executive bus fleet, formerly the municipal Glasgow Corporation Transport), which had itself recently bought out the former Kelvin Central Buses (an amalgamation of Kelvin Scottish and Central Scottish, owned by the state-owned Scottish Bus Group).

First Glasgow has two operator's licences:

- First Glasgow (No. 1) Limited – the former Strathclyde Buses licence
- First Glasgow (No. 2) Limited – the former Kelvin Central Buses licence

Buses carry legal signwriting for First Glasgow Limited, despite this having been a dormant company since at least 2008.

== Services ==
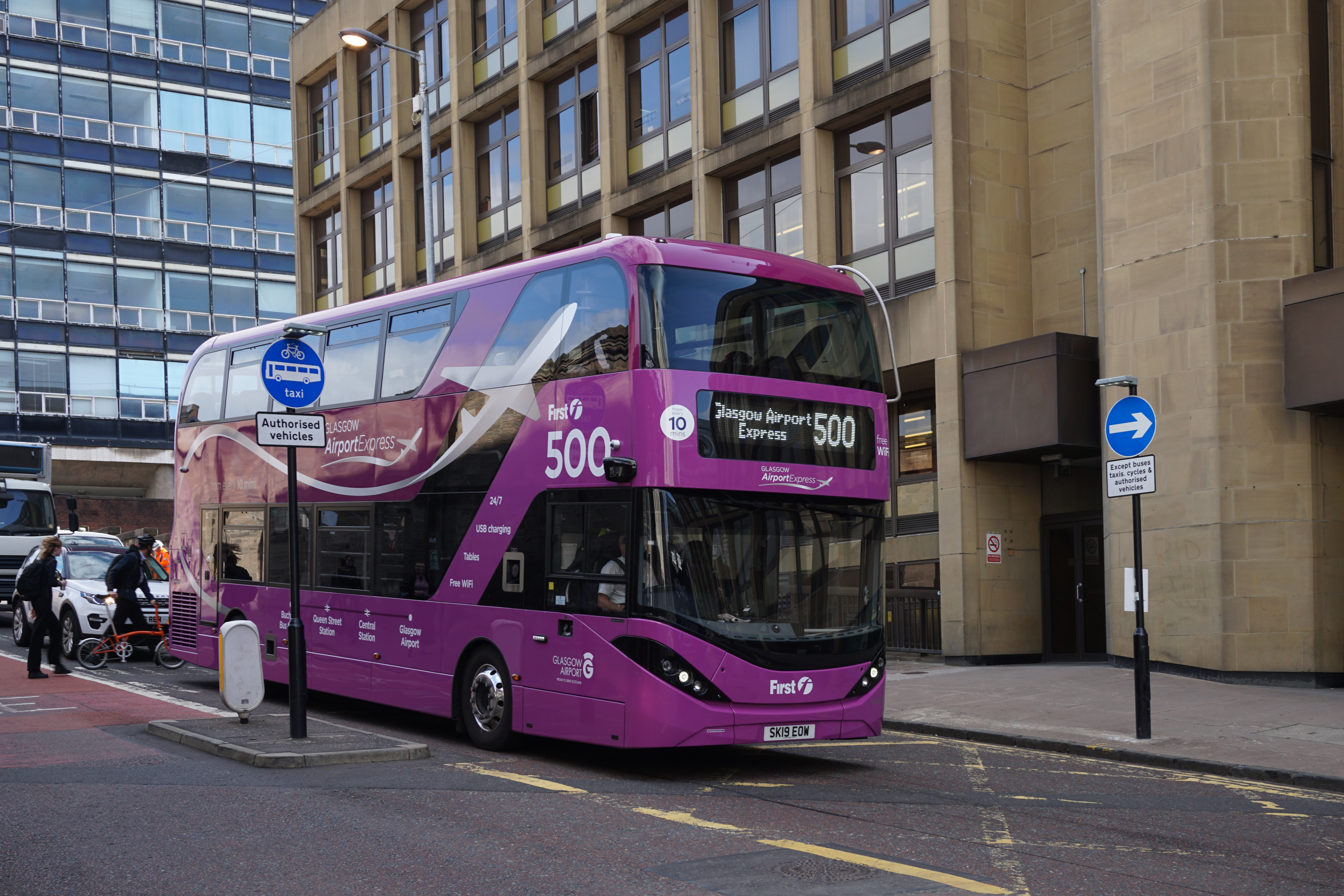
Airport Express Alexander Dennis Enviro400 City in 2019

First Glasgow mainly run services in Greater Glasgow and Lanarkshire areas of Strathclyde. However, some services also run outside of these areas. It was one of the first bus operators to introduce an "overground", a colour-coded set of bus routes with route branding on the bus exteriors and timetables. As of 2006, route branding has been removed from buses but remained on timetables until mid 2008.

First Glasgow reintroduced route branding in the form of SimpliCITY in May 2013 as a way to improve bus services in Glasgow, after a period of taking consultation from residents of Glasgow about the planned route changes. Buses were installed with free Wi-Fi and were branded with SimpliCITY logos, while routes were simplified in order to make more frequent journeys in and out of the city centre.

== Fleet ==
As of July 2025, First Glasgow operates a fleet of over 690 buses on over 84 routes, a majority of these buses being built by either Alexander Dennis or Wrightbus.

A Low Emission Zone (LEZ) covering Glasgow city centre was introduced on 31 December 2018; the first phase of this applying solely to local service buses. In October and November 2018, to comply with the new emission standards, First Glasgow placed into service a first batch of Alexander Dennis Enviro400 MMCs onto route 75, followed by an order for a further 53 Enviro400 MMCs, 10 Enviro400 Cities for the Glasgow Airport Express service, and 12 Enviro200 MMCs for delivery in 2019, partly funded by Transport Scotland's Scottish Green Bus Fund.

Battery electric buses first entered service with First Glasgow in the form of two BYD Alexander Dennis Enviro200EV single-deck buses in January 2020, purchased with funding from SP Energy Networks for service on route M3. 22 more Enviro200EVs were later delivered to Caledonia depot in November 2021, which were used as shuttle buses for the 2021 United Nations Climate Change Conference being held in the city, followed by a repeat order for 50 more in September 2022. Orders were also made for 91 BYD Alexander Dennis Enviro400EV double-decker buses alongside 35 more Enviro200EVs in March 2021, the first of which began to enter service from December 2021, and 50 Enviro200EVs began to be delivered to Scotstoun depot from June 2023.

First Glasgow aims to be an entirely zero-emission company by 2035, with over 30% of the fleet's buses being electric, and the vast majority of the remaining diesel buses being LEZ compliant. The company's Caledonia depot is the largest electric vehicle charging station in the United Kingdom, currently capable of charging 150 electric buses at once, with infrastructure work currently underway to expand this to a total of 350 charging points. 27 dual-head charging units are also situated at Scotstoun depot.

Thirty Enviro200EVs were temporarily withdrawn by First Glasgow in January 2025 in order to resolve "structural failures", with diesel and electric buses being loaned in from across the FirstGroup to replace the fleet. The majority of these were repaired and had reentered service by March 2025, although a number of the loaned buses stayed in the fleet.

== Depots ==
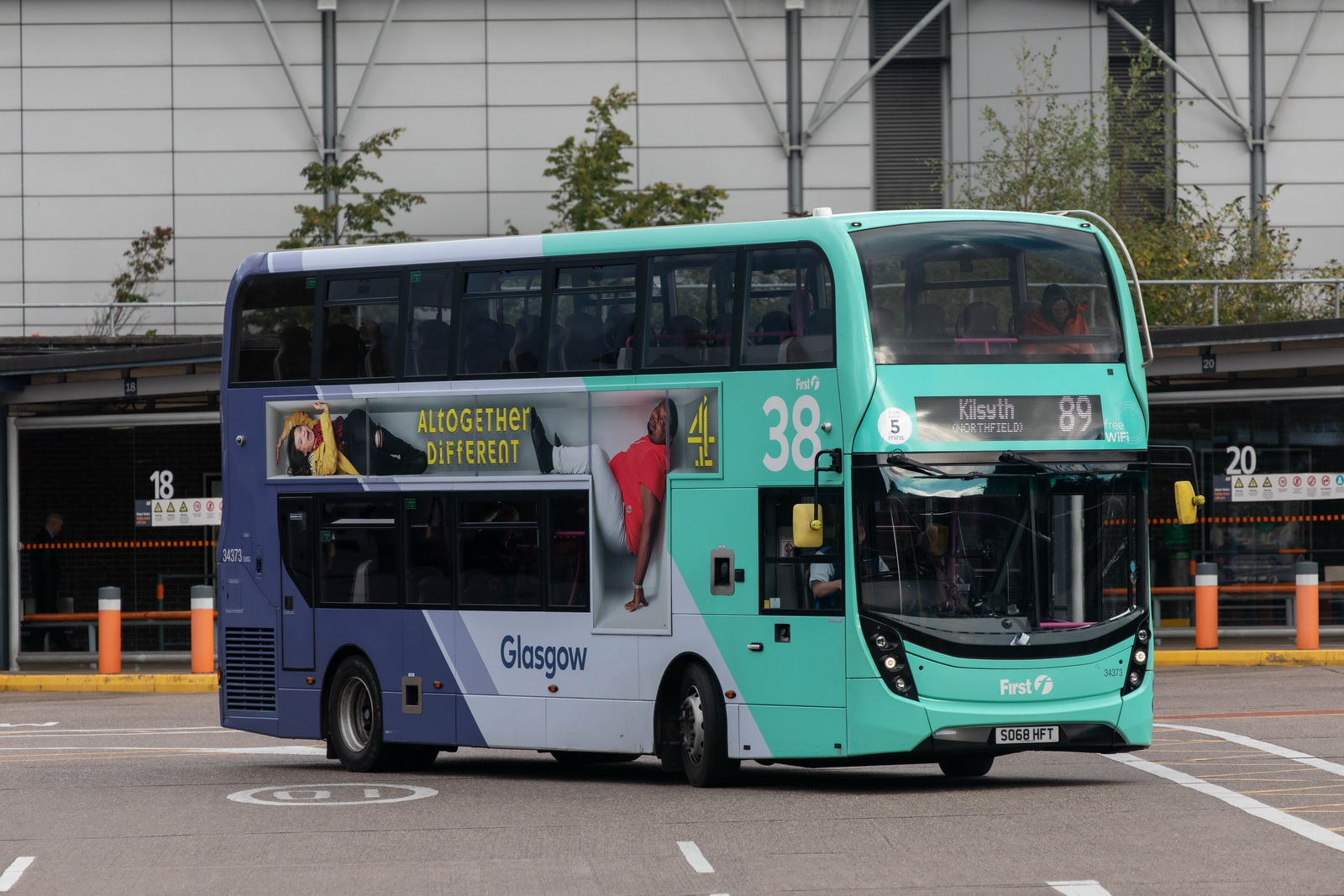
Alexander Dennis Enviro400 MMC at Buchanan bus station in September 2022

First Glasgow currently operates out of five depots:

- Caledonia (100 Cathcart Road)
- Dumbarton (Birch Road)
- Scotstoun (1075 South Street)
- Blantyre (5 Glasgow Road)
- Overtown (Castlehill Road)

In May 2013, the Cumbernauld depot closed with staff, buses and services transferred to Larkfield, Parkhead and Blantyre depots.

The Larkfield depot in Glasgow's Govanhill closed on 18 October 2014, with all staff, buses and services moving to a new purpose-built facility on the site of the former Gushetfaulds railfreight terminal on nearby Cathcart Road. The new depot and head office, known as Caledonia Depot, opened on 14 October 2014. It was officially opened by First Minister of Scotland Nicola Sturgeon on 12 December that year.

In January 2016, the Parkhead depot closed after 93 years of operation, and services and drivers transferred to the new Caledonia Depot on Cathcart Road.

== Fares ==
First Glasgow operates an "exact fare" payment policy which was also used by predecessors Trans Clyde and Strathclyde Buses. In 2022, First Glasgow introduced a contactless card payment system known as Tap On Tap Off which is compatible with Apple Pay, Google Pay and Samsung Pay as well as contactless payment cards. Customers can also buy various tickets such as 5 single journeys, 10 single journeys, day, weekly, monthly through First's official app.

First Glasgow is also a partner in Glasgow Tripper, an unlimited day pass which can also be used on McGill's, Stagecoach within the Glasgow area, Glasgow Citybus and Whitelaw's.
