= M3 Milton–City Centre =

Bus route in Glasgow, Scotland

M3

Overview
- Operator: First Glasgow
- Status: Operating

Route
- Start: Milton
- Via: Glasgow city centre
- End: Cowcaddens subway station

Route M3 is a bus route in Glasgow, Scotland. It runs from Milton to the city centre via Springburn and Stobhill Hospital. It is operated commercially by First Glasgow.

== History ==
The service was formerly numbered 3. In October 2015, the frequency of the route was reduced to hourly.

In January 2020, the route began being operated by electric buses. Two Alexander Dennis Enviro200EV-bodied BYD buses were deployed on the route.
