= Old Glasgow Club =

Historical society in Glasgow

The Old Glasgow Club is a club that began in Glasgow in 1900. It was formed to preserve the history of the city.

== Activities ==
The first meeting of the club took place on 17 December 1900 in the Atheneum, Glasgow. It followed an advertisement having been placed in The Evening Citizen and Glasgow Herald asking for people to form a society to discuss and share information about the history of Glasgow. At the first meeting, Mr Charles Taylor read a paper on "The passing of Old Glasgow".

The constitution stated that the object of the club was "‘to form a centre of Glasgow gentlemen for the purpose of hearing papers, reminiscences and notes on Old Glasgow Life, and to record these for permanent preservation"

The club collected books and papers relating to Glasgow's past. A librarian was elected in 1903 to look after the collection, and a list of the books was published in the yearly transactions.

Many artefacts were donated by the club to the City of Glasgow. They form the nucleus of the collections of Glasgow Museums relating to the city of Glasgow.

== Publications ==
The first annual edition of the Transactions was published in August 1904. The transactions consist of the records of the business of the club, summaries of papers given to the club, lists of membership, property inventories and reports from office bearers.

== Notable members ==
Female members were first admitted in 1908.

- Stephen Adam (stained glass designer)
- Francis Thornton Barrett
- William Bilsland
- Dreda Boyd, first female member of the Old Glasgow Club
- Agnes McLaren Lockhart, elected first lady president in 1933.
- John Keppie
- John Ord
- William Smeal
