= Kelvin Central Buses =

Bus operator in Dunbartonshire and Lanarkshire, Scotland

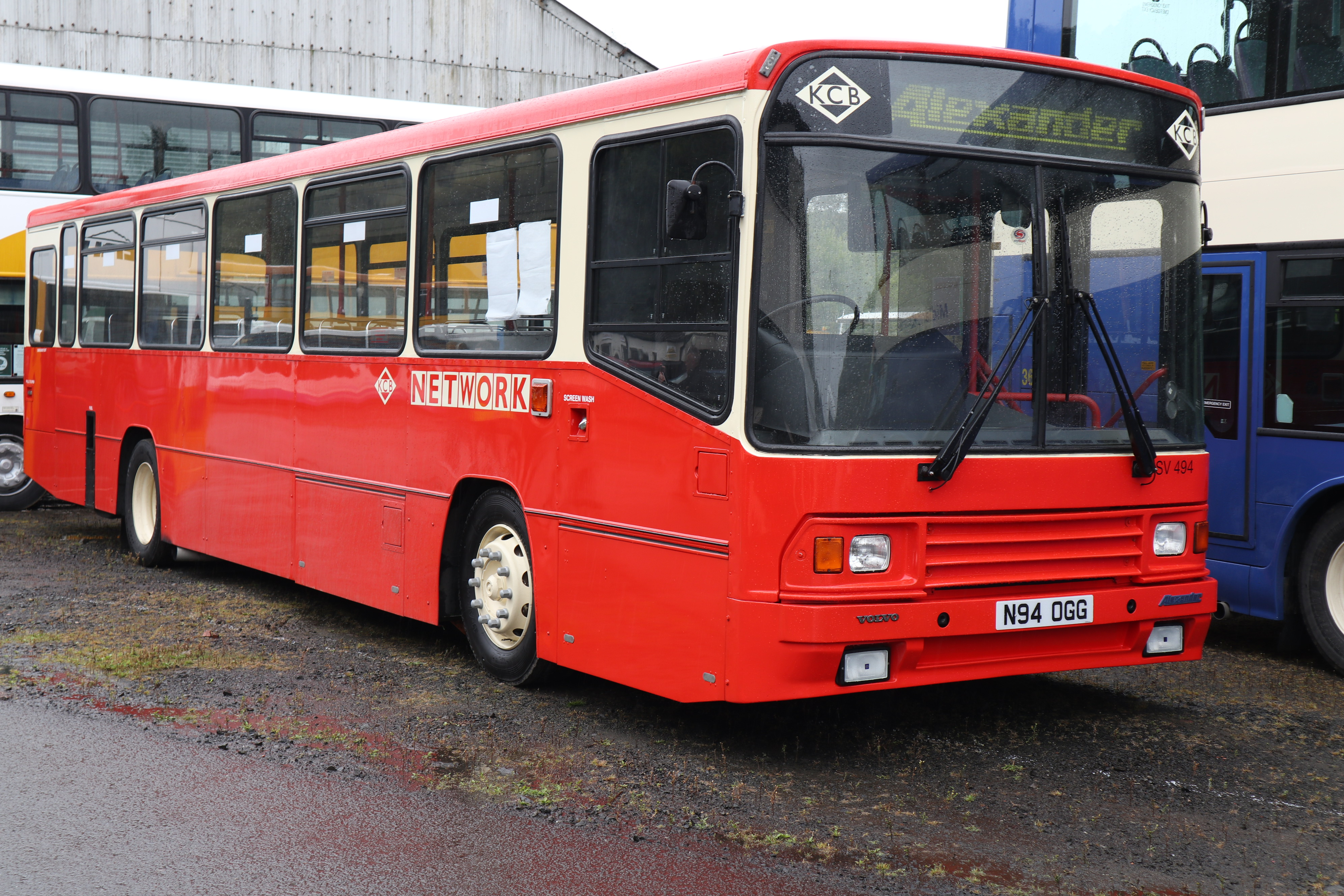
- Preserved Alexander PS bodied Volvo B10M at the Scottish Vintage Bus Museum in August 2021
- Parent: Scottish Bus Group (1989–1991); Management (1991–1994); SB Holdings (1994–1998)
- Founded: March 1989; 37 years ago
- Defunct: 29 May 1998; 28 years ago
- Headquarters: Motherwell, North Lanarkshire, Scotland (until 1995); Glasgow, Scotland (from 1995)
- Service area: Dunbartonshire; Lanarkshire
- Service type: Bus operator
- Depots: 6
- Fleet: 492 (February 1991)

Kelvin Central Buses was a bus operator in Scotland. Formed as a subsidiary of the Scottish Bus Group in July 1989 from the merger of Kelvin Scottish and Central Scottish, it was sold in a management buyout and in July 1998, became part of First Glasgow.

== History ==
In March 1989, Central Scottish's legal name was changed in preparation for its July 1989 merger with Kelvin Scottish to Kelvin Central Buses (KCB), as part of wider preparations for the privatisation of the Scottish Bus Group. Kelvin Central had a difficult beginning with ongoing industrial action caused by the sacking of four Central Scottish shop stewards for "gross misconduct"; in May, Kelvin Central's management sued the Transport and General Workers' Union for damages and threatened to sack 800 striking workers. Following an agreement by the management to reinstate three of the four shop stewards and implement a revised work roster, the dispute was resolved, however, a number of new operators had stepped in to take on Kelvin Central's abandoned services.

Whereas Kelvin had been one of the more successful of the Scottish Bus Group subsidiaries, Central was financially weakened, suffered from heavy competition and burdened with a large debt. In a report from Transport Advisory Services, Kelvin Central Buses placed last out of 123 operators for profitability in 1989-1990, taking a –23.9% negative pre-tax return on turnover. As such, Kelvin Central relied on second hand purchases until it became profitable, closed its garages in East Kilbride and Wishaw with the loss of 160 jobs, and ceased to operate Scottish Citylink services in 1990 due to the profit margin being deemed insufficient. As part of the privatisation of the Scottish Bus Group, Kelvin Central was offered for sale in July 1990. The only bid lodged was for a management buyout, with Kelvin Central's workers voting to accept a pay cut, reduced bonuses, higher working hours and individual payments of £300 (equivalent to £1,000 in 2025) to support the bid, resulting in Kelvin Central being successfully being sold to its management and employees in February 1991.

Many of the smaller independent operators that competed heavily with Kelvin Central, such as John Morrow Services of Clydebank, were purchased, paving the way for the company to become the dominant operator once again in much of Lanarkshire. Stagecoach Holdings' Magic Bus operation in Glasgow was also purchased in 1992, bringing Kelvin Central into the city's Castlemilk and Easterhouse housing schemes and also giving Kelvin Central the right to use the Magic Bus name, and the company slowly returned to profitability, buying its first new buses in 1993; Alexander Strider bodied Volvo B10Bs, Alexander Dash bodied Volvo B6s, and Alexander Royale bodied Volvo Olympians.

In September 1994, former Glasgow passenger transport executive operator Strathclyde Buses announced that it was planning to bid £11 million (equivalent to £23,210,000 in 2025) to buy Kelvin Central Buses. Talks on a deal to merge the two companies took place during October, with Strathclyde Buses agreeing to purchase 75% of shares in Kelvin Central, and the sale was completed on 22 October 1994, with Kelvin Central Buses becoming a subsidiary of SB Holdings Ltd.

At that time, Stagecoach Western Scottish were poised to launch a network of Glasgow city services under the Stagecoach Glasgow brand, competing directly with services operated by both Strathclyde Buses and Kelvin Central. Weeks before these new services were due to commence, Stagecoach acquired a 20% stake in SB Holdings in November 1994 for £8.3 million (equivalent to £17,513,000 in 2025), averting a potential 'bus war' in the city, granting Stagecoach a seat on the SB Holdings board, and seeing 18 Alexander PS bodied Volvo B10Ms sold to SB Holdings. However, the Monopolies and Mergers Commission found the Stagecoach stake in the combined company to be against the public interest, ruling that its ownership of both Western Scottish and SB Holdings would give Stagecoach an overly dominant market share of Glasgow's bus network, and ordered Stagecoach Holdings to divest its 20% share in the firm and give up its seat on the SB Holdings board in May 1995.

The ownership issue was not to be resolved until June 1996, when FirstBus purchased SB Holdings, including Stagecoach's 20% shareholding, for £96 million (equivalent to £192,694,000 in 2025). A new all-over red livery was adopted for the combined company, and the KCB Network trading name was replaced with Kelvin, and later First Kelvin. In 1998, Kelvin Central Buses was rebranded as First Glasgow after the sale was approved, with Kelvin Central Buses Ltd renamed to First Glasgow (No.2) Ltd.

== Operations ==
On the formation of the Kelvin Central, from its head office in Traction House, Motherwell, Kelvin Central had an operating area stretching from Loch Lomond in the west, the Campsie Fells in the north, Shotts to the east and Strathaven to the south. Kelvin Central was the largest operator in Dunbartonshire and Lanarkshire, operating services in the towns of Airdrie, Cumbernauld, Dumbarton, Hamilton and Kirkintilloch, Motherwell as well as in the city of Glasgow.

Depots were located in Old Kilpatrick, Milngavie, Kirkintilloch, Kilsyth, Stepps, Cumbernauld, East Kilbride, Airdrie, Motherwell, Wishaw and Hamilton. However, Wishaw and East Kilbride were closed soon after the merger as part of a cost-cutting exercise following strike action, with services in the East Kilbride largely withdrawn as a result.
