= Lowland Scottish =

Defunct bus company in the UK

Lowland Scottish Omnibuses Ltd was a bus operator in south eastern Scotland and parts of Northern England. The company was formed in 1985 and operated under the identities Lowland Scottish, Lowland and First Lowland / First SMT, until 1999 when the company's operations were combined with the operations of Midland Bluebird in a new company, First Edinburgh Ltd. As of 26 March 2017 these operations were transferred to West Coast Motors (trading as Borders Buses).

== Operation ==
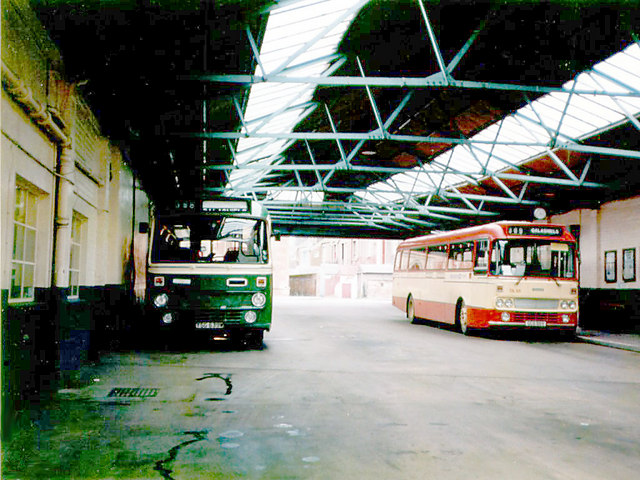
The depot at Kelso, pictured in September 1985.

From its head office in Galashiels, Lowland Scottish operated throughout the Scottish Borders and parts of Lothian in south east Scotland and across the border into Northumberland in north east England, bounded by Edinburgh to the north, Peebles to the west and Berwick-upon-Tweed in the east.

Lowland Scottish operated from depots in the towns of Galashiels, Haddington, Berwick-upon-Tweed, Dunbar, Hawick, Jedburgh, Kelso, North Berwick and Peebles. Principal services linked these towns with Edinburgh and with each other, along with a limited number of urban services in the larger towns and other rural or schools services. The most important route in the Borders was Service 95, linking Edinburgh and Carlisle, branded as the Borders Rail Link bus service.

== History ==
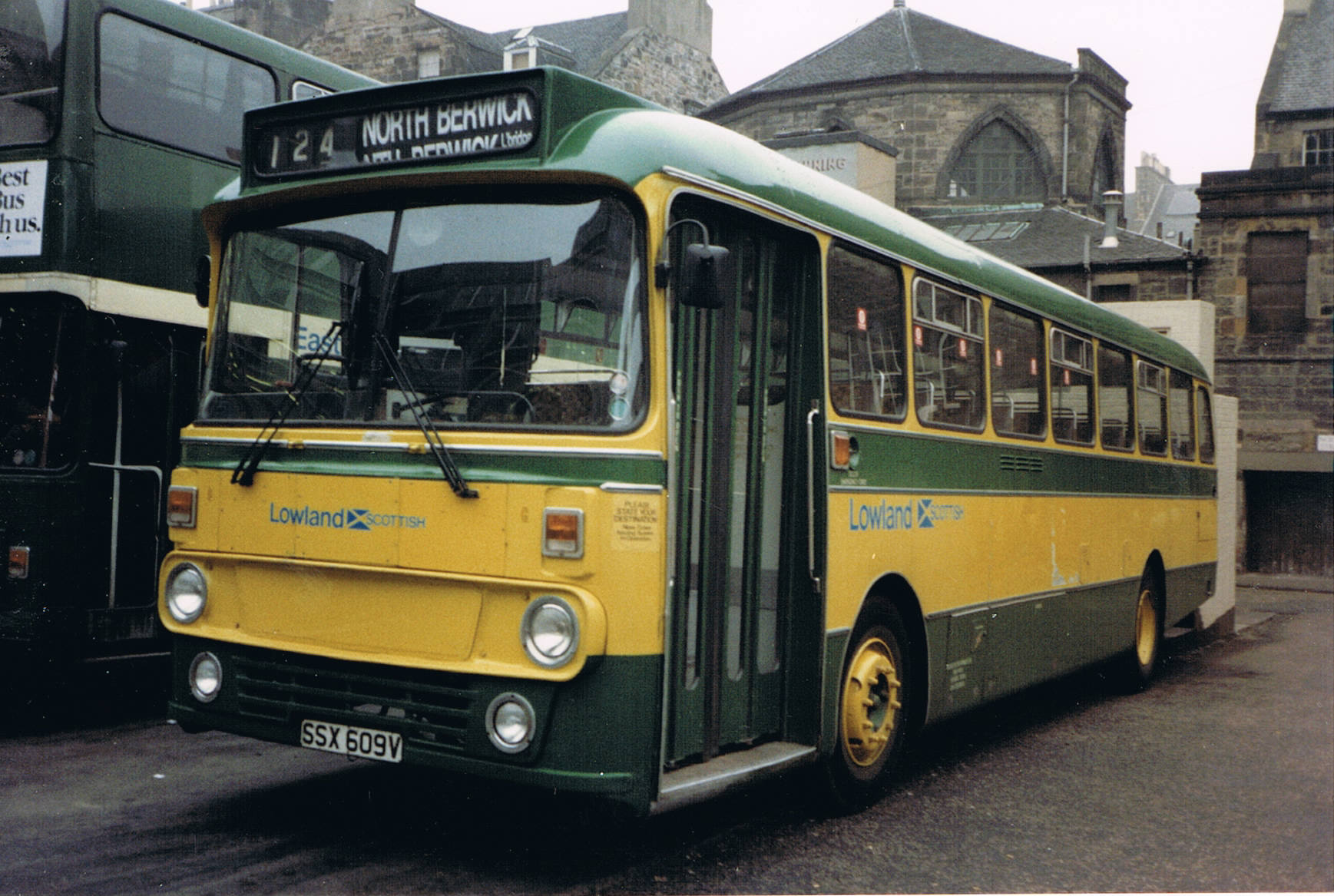
Ex-Eastern Scottish Seddon Pennine 7 609 (SSX 609V), pictured at St Andrew Sq Bus Station, Edinburgh. This bus operated on the company's East Lothian routes.

Lowland Scottish Omnibuses Limited was created in 1985 as part of the reorganisation of the state owned Scottish Bus Group (SBG) in preparation for deregulation of the bus industry in 1986, and eventual privatisation. It inherited the south-eastern depots and operations of Scottish Omnibuses Limited (Eastern Scottish), in the Scottish Borders, eastern East Lothian and Berwick-upon-Tweed. The new company introduced a new livery similar to the green and cream Eastern Scottish colours, but using a brighter green and a more striking yellow.

Upon formation, Lowland initially faced no significant competition, thanks largely to its sparsely populated operating area. Town services within Berwick-upon-Tweed continued to be shared with recently privatised Northumbria Motor Services, with Lowland and Northumbria having adjacent depot buildings fronting a shared bus station. This working relationship had been built up between the companies' predecessors, Scottish Omnibuses (SMT/Eastern Scottish) and United Automobile Services.

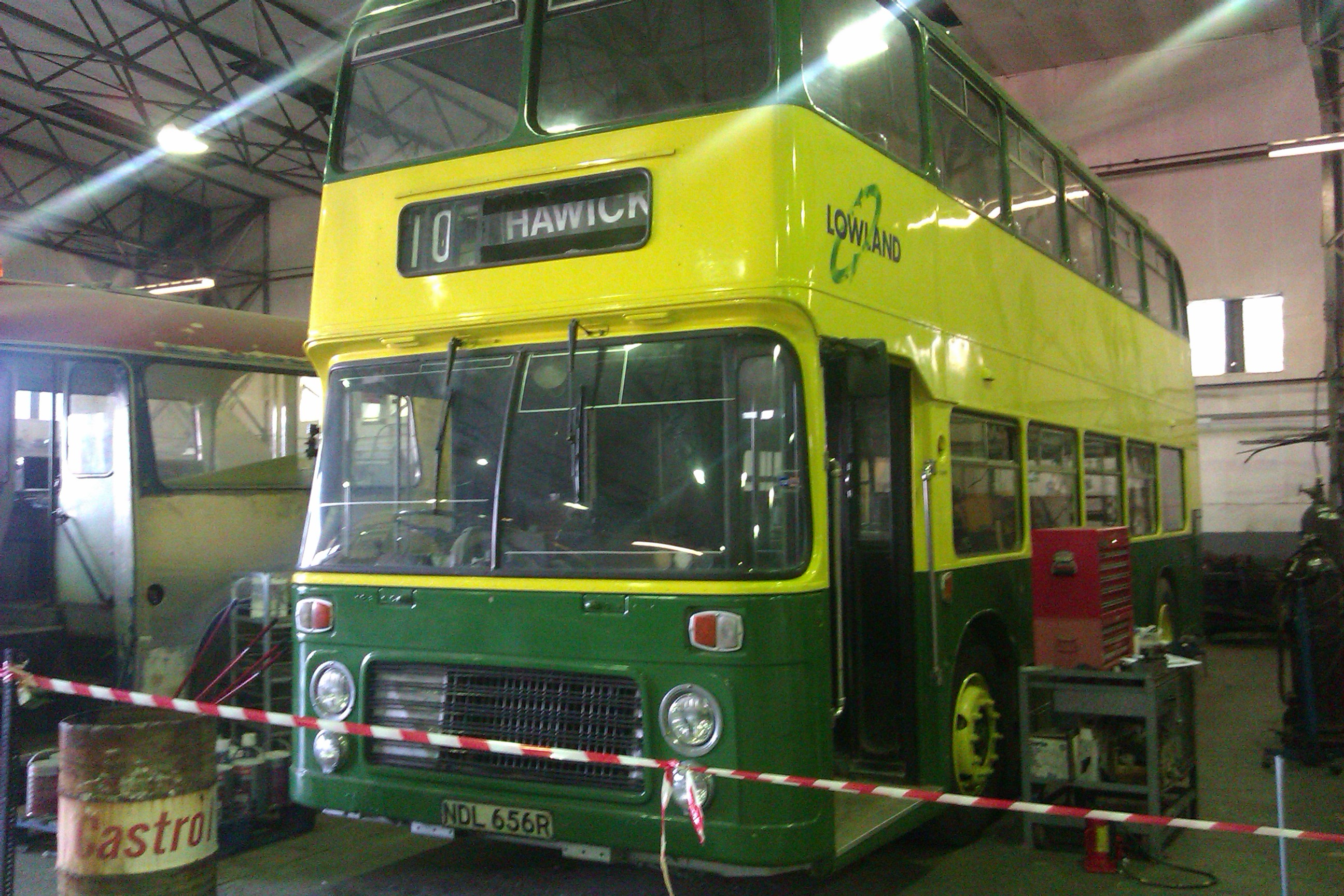
Ex-Southern Vectis Bristol VRT 856 (NDL 656R) was purchased by Lowland in 1991. It is now preserved in the original post-privatisation "Lowland Omnibuses" livery at the Scottish Vintage Bus Museum.

On deregulation, the relationship between Lowland and Northumbria in Berwick-upon-Tweed broke down, and fierce competition ensued between the two operators for several years. The 'bus war' eventually ended in the mid-1990s with Lowland pulling out of Berwick as part of an agreement between First and Cowie Group, by that time owners of Lowland and Northumbria respectively. Arriva, Cowie Group's successor, withdrew from Berwick ten years later, leaving the town routes to a local independent operator, Perryman's Buses.

Lowland Scottish became the first of the SBG subsidiaries to be privatised when in August 1990 the company's management and employees bought the business for £3.1m through their holding company Reiver Ventures Ltd., the word "Scottish" then dropped from the company's legal and trading names at that time. Lowland had been a profitable unit within the SBG thanks largely to the limited competition in its rural territory, though this operating area did not give much scope for expansion. The company therefore sought to develop its coach business and to expand its presence in the more populated Lothians area. In 1991 the bus and coach business of Ian Glass Coaches was acquired, with a depot in Haddington. The depot in Dunbar closed shortly afterwards, as the East Lothian area operations were concentrated on Haddington. Smaller takeovers were of Shanks ('Border Travel') of Galashiels in 1992 and Grieve's Taxis of Hawick in 1993. Diversification included the acquisition of a van hire firm, and development of the PSV/HGV driving school business inherited from Shanks. The company also acquired an interest in Lothian Transit of Newtongrange, a low-cost operator running tendered bus services in the Edinburgh area.

== Demise ==
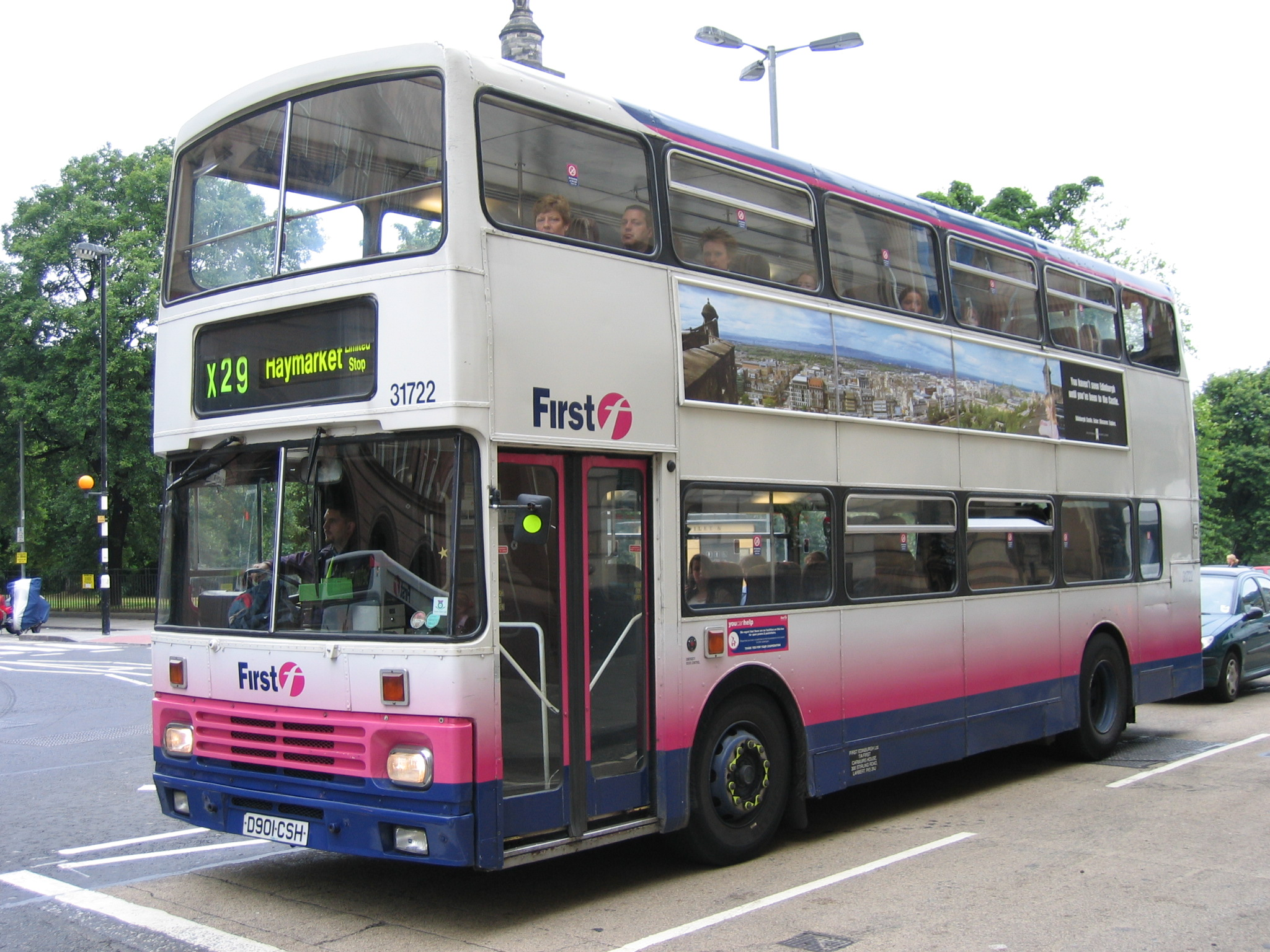
Leyland Olympian (D901 CSH) was purchased new by Lowland Scottish in 1987, where it was allocated to North Berwick sub-depot and given the fleetnumber 901. It is pictured here in First Edinburgh 'Barbie' livery in 2005.

In November 1994, GRT Group (which later became FirstGroup) bought Reiver Ventures for £2.4m. GRT had purchased neighbouring Eastern Scottish (now trading as SMT once more) the previous month, and with its ownership of Midland Bluebird (the old Midland Scottish), GRT operated across a substantial part of central Scotland, from Oban in the west coast to the border with England. Reorganisation of the three companies quickly followed, breaking SMT in two and merging the parts with Midland and Lowland. As a result, Lowland inherited SMT's Dalkeith and Musselburgh depots in 1996. This changed the focus of the company from a rural operator serving the Borders to one dominated by suburban services around Edinburgh, and coincided with the start of a gradual retrenchment in the south which eventually resulted in the closure of all of the Borders depots except Galashiels.

When the 'First' corporate style was introduced, the trading names First Lowland and First SMT were used, the latter being restricted to the former SMT operations around Edinburgh. A final round of reorganisation in 1999 saw Lowland Omnibuses absorbed into Midland Bluebird Ltd and a new company, First Edinburgh Ltd.

Subsequently FirstGroup has divested itself of all its operations in the Borders. Borders Buses now cover virtually all the major routes once run by Lowland, with the exception of those in East Lothian.

== See also ==
- List of bus operators of the United Kingdom
