= First Scotland East =

Bus operator in east and central Scotland

First South East & Central Scotland

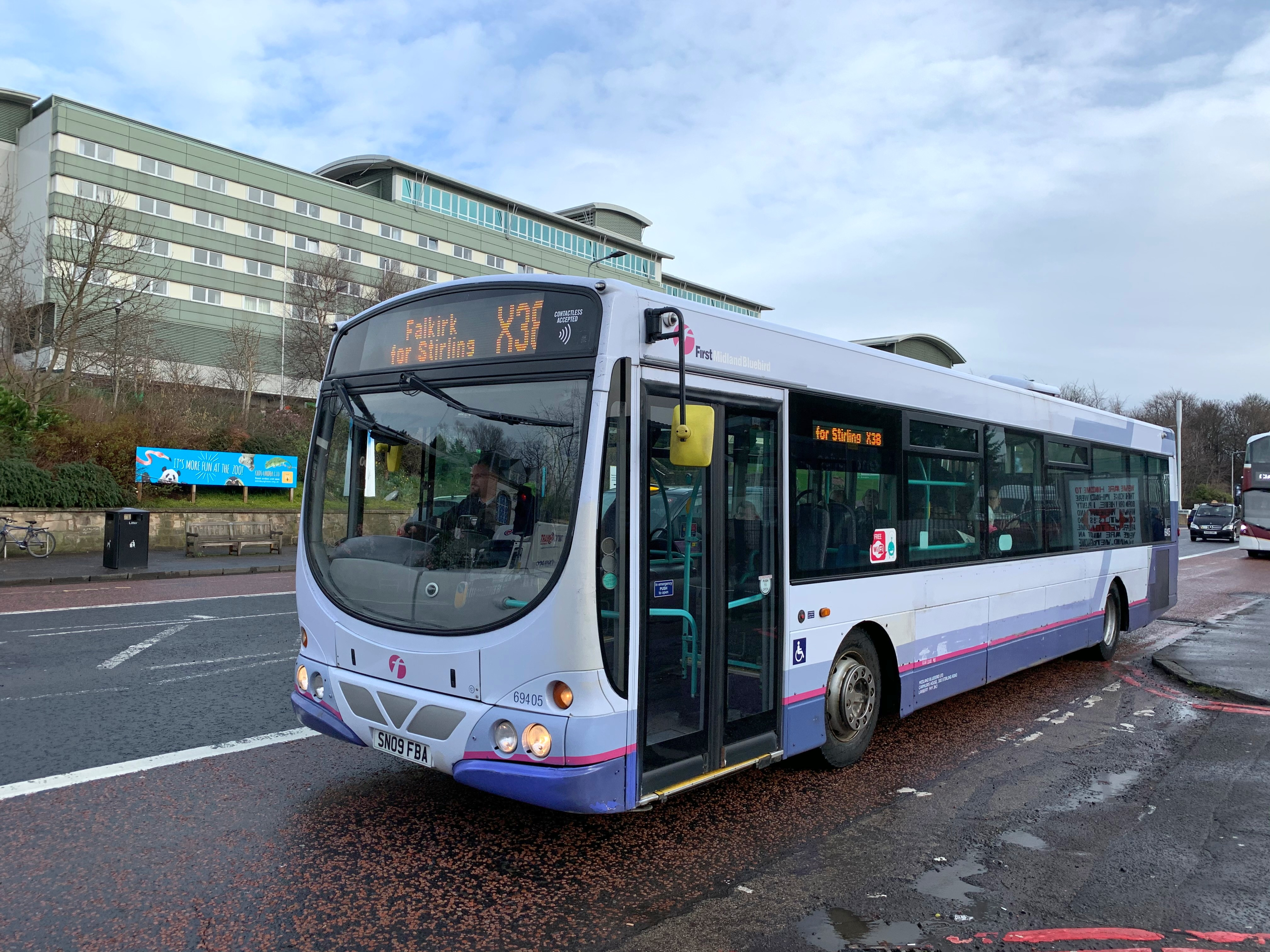
- Parent: FirstGroup
- Founded: 1997; 29 years ago
- Defunct: 19 September 2022; 4 years ago
- Headquarters: Larbert, Scotland, UK
- Service area: City of Edinburgh; City of Glasgow; Clackmannanshire; East Dunbartonshire; East Lothian; Falkirk; Fife; Midlothian; North Lanarkshire; Scottish Borders; Stirling; West Lothian
- Service type: Bus and coach
- Fleet: 257 (September 2022)
- Website: https://www.firstbus.co.uk/south-east-and-central-scotland

First South East & Central Scotland, formerly known as First Scotland East, was an operator of both local and regional bus services in Clackmannanshire, East Dunbartonshire, East Lothian, Falkirk, Fife, Midlothian, North Lanarkshire, Scottish Borders, Stirling and West Lothian, as well as the cities of Edinburgh and Glasgow, Scotland. It was a subsidiary of FirstGroup, which operates bus, rail and tram services across the United Kingdom and Ireland.

First South East and Central Scotland was acquired by McGill's Bus Services in September 2022, with the operation rebranded to McGill's Scotland East.

== History ==
In 1997, the merger of three subsidiaries took place, with Eastern Scottish, Lowland Scottish and Midland Scottish becoming First Edinburgh, which broadly aligns with the original Scottish Motor Traction area. Following the merger, operations were simplified. Some areas, including Midlothian and West Lothian, were formerly served by at least two out of the three subsidiaries. Despite the name, the company served a much larger area, covering much of Central Scotland and the Scottish Borders, as well as Cumbria and Northumberland, England. In 2008, the company was renamed First Scotland East – better reflecting the operating area.

In 1999, some operations were transferred to the company's Larbert depot, with a new corporate livery introduced across the fleet. By 2002, all of the company's operations were controlled by Larbert.

In 2000, the company was split into two, operating as First Edinburgh and First Midland Bluebird.

=== FifeFirst ===
In June 1997, the company launched the FifeFirst brand, in order to compete with Stagecoach Fife, who had recently started competing with First's Glasgow operations. Competition took place, with service 56 from Edinburgh to Dunfermline, Cowdenbeath and Ballingry using a combination of 12 new Wright Axcess-Ultralow bodied Scania L113s alongside examples transferred from Lowland Scottish, Midland Scottish and Rider York, all painted in an allover red livery. A sub-depot was established in Dunfermline, with Westfield providing most of the vehicles used. FifeFirst ceased in July 2000 when the service was axed, with the low-floor buses used being transferred to the Falkirk area.

=== ScotRail ===
In June 2004, the ScotRail franchise was awarded to First, with the services transferring to First ScotRail in October 2004. The Competition Commission placed a number of controls and undertakings, which had an effect on the company's ability to raise fares and alter a selected number of services. In 2009 and 2012, First were released from a number of routes which were controlled.

=== Restructure ===
In June 2012, the company closed their depot in Dalkeith, whilst scaling back Musselburgh-based operations. In November 2012, the company's Linlithgow depot was closed, with operations transferred to Larbert and Livingston depots.

In June 2013, route X38 (from Edinburgh to Falkirk and Stirling) was re-branded as First Bluebird, with buses painted in a dedicated blue livery. Within a year, most of the buses operating in the Forth Valley area were also re-branded as First Bluebird.

First tried to improve passenger growth, with a number of revised networks in Falkirk and West Lothian, during 2012. In January 2015, First withdrew over a dozen bus routes in and around Falkirk, citing that routes had been operating at a "considerable loss" for many years.

In October 2015, the company made a request to the Competition and Markets Authority to review the undertakings given in 2002 following the Monopolies & Mergers Commission's conclusion that the completed acquisition by First of SB Holdings Limited, which took place in 1996, created a merger situation which may be expected to operate against the public interest. As part of the undertakings, the company had a mileage floor which required to them to operate a specific number of miles, regardless of the circumstances. In April 2016, the company was released from the undertakings with all requirements dropped.

In May 2016, the company announced that it would cease operations in East Lothian, with the closure of Musselburgh and North Berwick depots – affecting a total of 88 jobs. In August 2016, staff and operations were transferred to Lothian Buses. (Note: Services in East Lothian are operated under the East Coast Buses brand.)

In 2016, Perryman's Buses (Note: Perryman's Buses now operates as Borders Buses, following acquisition by West Coast Motors.) took over several services from First Scotland East. The company's remaining operations in Scottish Borders, including the depot at Galashiels, as well as outstations at Hawick, Kelso and Peebles, were sold to the company in March 2017. The 2015 reopening of the Borders Railway between Edinburgh and Tweedbank was cited as one of the main reasons for the sale.

In May 2017, the company announced plans to bring "significant improvements" to their services. This resulted in the introduction of 7,000 miles of additional journeys and six vehicles to the network in West Lothian, as well as the reintroduction of a direct link between Bathgate and Gyle Centre via Livingston and Edinburgh Airport.

=== Acquisition by McGill's Bus Services ===
On 6 September 2022, it was announced that First Scotland East had been acquired by McGill's Bus Services. First Scotland East was rebranded McGill's Scotland East, also trading as McGill's Midland Bluebird and McGill's Eastern Scottish. Its four depots, 550 employees and 257 buses, as well as the Bright Bus Tours open top bus operation in Edinburgh, were all transferred under McGill's ownership.

== Controversies ==
=== Edinburgh Bus War ===
Between March 2000 and July 2002, First Scotland East sought to increase their market share of local bus services in and around the city of Edinburgh. As a result, a bus war sparked between FirstGroup and Lothian Buses, with fares cut, additional vehicles drafted in, routes diverted and timetables altered.

Lothian Buses complained to the Office of Fair Trading, claiming that FirstGroup was engaging in anti-competitive behaviour, in an effort to become the dominant operator in Edinburgh. However, it was later ruled by the Office of Fair Trading that FirstGroup's conduct represented "legitimate competition".

Despite this, following the ruling, First Scotland East curtailed their network of services in Edinburgh, bringing an end to the bus war. Heavy losses were made, which resulted in cutbacks in many parts of their operations.

=== Public inquiries ===
First Scotland East had appeared before the Traffic Commissioner on five occasions. Public inquiries were held regarding vehicle maintenance (2004, 2005 & 2008) and timekeeping (2008 & 2010).

In November 2011, a formal warning was issued regarding vehicle maintenance. In August 2012, the company appeared for the fifth time in front of the Traffic Commissioner, due to further issues regarding services in and around Falkirk.

In November 2013, a further hearing took place in front of the Deputy Traffic Commissioner, following an incident in March that year in which a vehicle lost its wheel in Edinburgh.

== Fleet and operations ==
=== Depots ===
The company operated from four depots across the region: Balfron, Bannockburn, Larbert and Livingston.

=== Vehicles ===
As of the company's takeover in September 2022, the First Scotland East fleet consisted of 257 buses. The fleet consisted mainly of diesel-powered single and double-deck buses manufactured by Alexander Dennis, Scania, Volvo and Wrightbus.
