= Scottish Motor Traction =

Scottish bus operator founded in 1905

Scottish Motor Traction (SMT) was a Scottish bus operator founded in 1905 that ran services for most of the 20th century.

== History ==
Scottish Motor Traction (SMT) was founded in Edinburgh in 1905 by William Johnston Thomson. It operated buses in much of central Scotland. Aside from its bus operations, by 1930 SMT had dealerships in Edinburgh selling cars and trucks at 89 Haymarket Terrace and 71 Lothian Road. It also operated an air taxi service using a De Havilland Fox Moth between 18 July and 31 October 1932. For many years it owned Dryburgh Abbey Hotel.

Following legislation that allowed railway companies to invest in bus operators, the London & North Eastern Railway and London, Midland & Scottish Railway took stakes in SMT in 1929. The next year, following its takeover of another operator, SMT started an express coach service from Edinburgh to London. SMT also acquired control of Walter Alexander & Sons bus services and coachbuilding operations, the Alexander family joining the SMT board.

SMT grew partly through the acquisition of smaller companies. Operations were decentralised to local areas, such as Central SMT in Lanarkshire, and Western SMT in south-west Scotland (both with red buses). The east of Scotland services operated as SMT (with green buses). Upon nationalisation of the SMT group's bus and coach services by the Attlee government in 1949, those of SMT itself were transferred to a new British Transport Commission subsidiary, Scottish Omnibuses Ltd. This continued to operate as SMT until the early 1960s, when the fleet name Eastern Scottish was adopted. Activities other than bus operations remained in private hands as SMT Sales & Service Ltd.

Following the demise of the British Transport Commission, SMT's operations became part of the state-owned Scottish Bus Group in 1962; this later became the Scottish Transport Group in 1969 following the addition of ferry services.

The Transport Act 1985 led to the deregulation of UK bus services, followed by privatisation of the bus-operating Scottish Transport Group subsidiaries. Western Scottish (formerly Western SMT) was sold to its local management in 1991, and was bought out by the Stagecoach Group in 1994, which renamed it Stagecoach West Scotland. The ferry services, run as Caledonian MacBrayne, remain owned by the Scottish government.

Following privatisation, Eastern Scottish briefly reverted to its former name SMT. It was bought out by GRT Group in October 1994.

In June 1995 GRT Group and Badgerline merged to create First Bus. Soon after this, SMT was split into two, with operations passing to neighbouring Lowland and Midland Bluebird. The SMT name and livery were initially retained.

In 1999, SMT's former operations, along with those of Lowland and Midland Bluebird, were rebranded as First Edinburgh. These were then sold on in 2022 with the Lowland Operations being sold to West Coast Motors, which rebranded itself as Border Buses. The Midland Bluebird Operations were sold to McGills Group, which rebranded itself as Midland Bluebird by McGills and Eastern Scottish by McGills.

== Publishing activities ==
The company published a monthly magazine from 1927 until 1958. It was called The SMT Magazine until 1936, when it became SMT Magazine & Scottish Country Life until 1954; and then Scotland's Magazine until 1958. Other publications included The SMT Magazine and Scottish Country Life Book of Scottish Golf Courses in 1939; a revised edition came out in 1945. Annuals were published from 1954. Copies of these publications are held by the National Library of Scotland and the British Library. Some issues of SMT Magazine between 1931 and 1946 are held by the Royal Collection Trust.

A copy of the November 1930 issue cost six pennies. It was an upmarket illustrated magazine with a perfect-bound square spine and colour cover. Morrison & Gibb, Tanfield, were the printers. The editor was J. Inglis Ker. The issue ran to 96 quarto pages plus the cover. The subtitle was "A monthly journal for all who travel by road or rail". Alongside the masthead where logos saying "associated with LMS" and "associated with LNER". These two rail companies had shareholdings in the SMT and there were close working relations. The cover of Stirling Castle was by the travel poster artist Frank Newbould.

Contributors included the author and Sissinghurst gardener Vita Sackville West (short story "To be let or sold"); travel writer Lewis Spence (“Early travellers in Scotland”); the Marxist archaeologist Gordon Childe discussing his recent excavation of Skara Brae; the botanist and explorer Captain Frank Kingdon-Ward; E. Hayter Simmonds on film-making at Elstree; Robert T. Skinner on Donaldson’s Hospital in Edinburgh; H.W. Timperley; and the Glasgow writer and antiquarian Dreda Boyd. An article about Ye Old Sheep Head Inn by M. S. Maddan makes use of a frowning face emoticon in the text. Ten pages are devoted to the Scottish Motor Show by George H. Cutbush, editor of the Motor World.

There were 35 pages of advertising, grouped before and after the editorial pages. Advertisers included several pages from the SMT company itself and many motoring companies: such as Albion and Sunbeam motor cars, BP, Dunlop, Goodyear, and omnibus maker T.S. Motors. Other advertisers included the printing block makers John Swain & Son; Neill & Co, pioneers of mechanical typesetting in Edinburgh; Murray’s Edinburgh ales; and the Weekly Scotsman.

The SMT advertising pages promoted the company's Edinburgh dealerships offering: MG sports cars from £185, a £389 Buick, discounts on Chevrolet trucks, and the £350 Marquette “Little Marvel” at its Haymarket Terrace showroom; and £185 Citroen cars and the £950 Minerva at Lothian Road.

== See also ==
- See Scottish Bus Group for the list of prefixes to the "Scottish" branding.
