= Volvo Ailsa B55 =

Front-engined double-decker bus

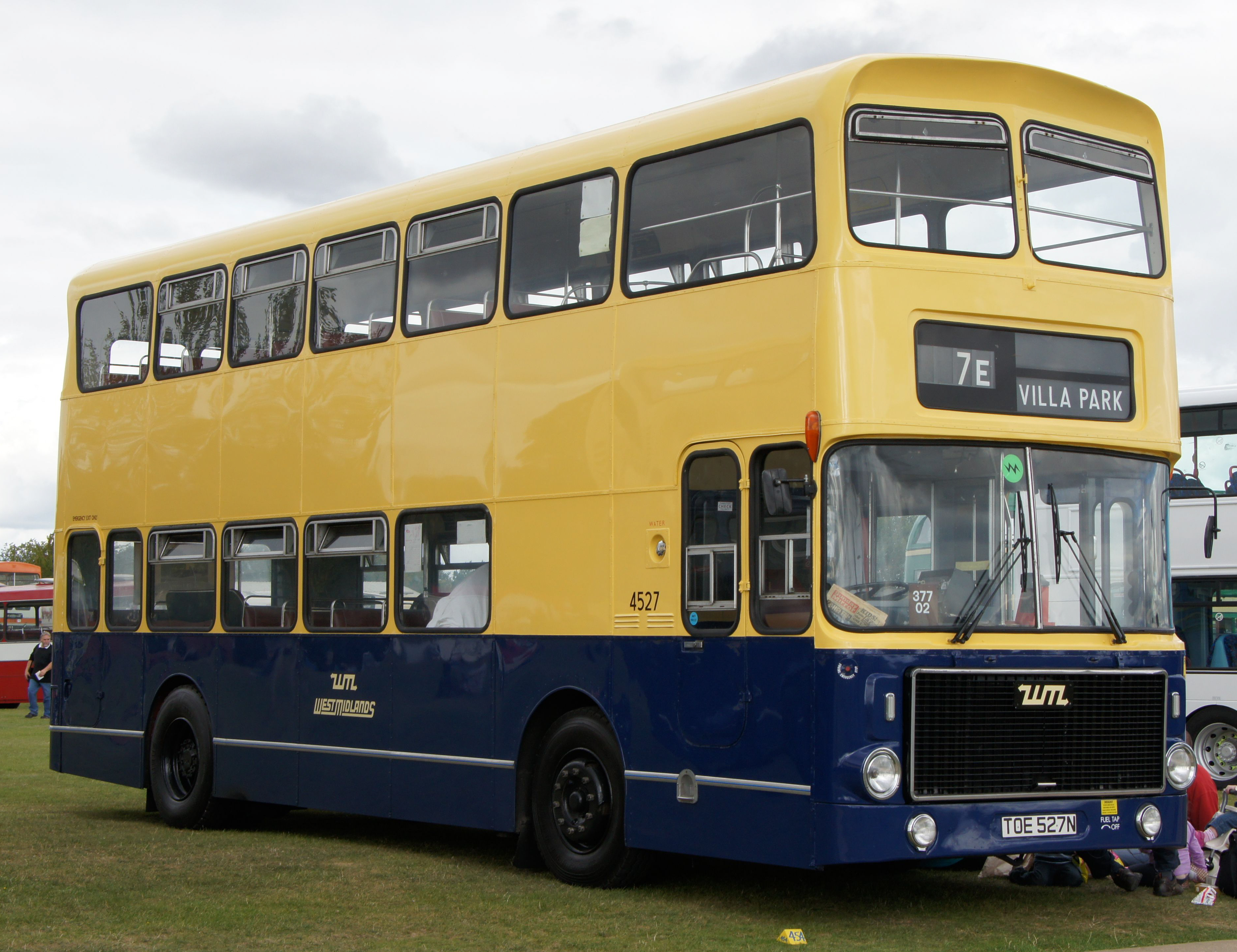
- Preserved West Midlands PTE Alexander AV bodied Volvo B55 at Showbus 2011 in Duxford

Overview
- Manufacturer: Ailsa/Volvo Buses
- Production: 1974–1985
- Assembly: Irvine, North Ayrshire, Scotland

Body and chassis
- Doors: 1 or 2
- Floor type: Step entrance

Powertrain
- Engine: Volvo TD70E/TD70H
- Power output: 186 brake horsepower (139 kW); 193 brake horsepower (144 kW); 201 brake horsepower (150 kW)
- Transmission: SCG 5-speed semi-automatic; Voith D851 automatic

Dimensions
- Length: 2-axle; 9.8–10.2 metres (32 ft 2 in – 33 ft 6 in); 3-axle; 12 metres (39 ft 4 in)
- Width: 2.356 metres (7 ft 8.8 in)
- Curb weight: 16,256 kilograms (35,838 lb)

Chronology
- Successor: Volvo B10M Citybus

The Volvo Ailsa B55 was a front-engined double-decker bus chassis manufactured in Irvine, North Ayrshire by Ailsa, Volvo's British subsidiary, from 1974 until 1985.

== Design ==
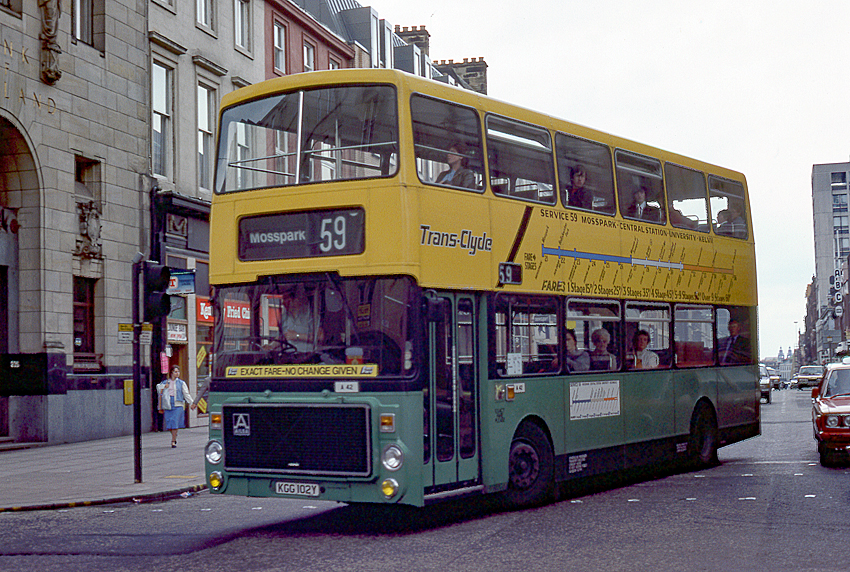
Trans-Clyde Alexander RV bodied Ailsa B55 in Glasgow in May 1984

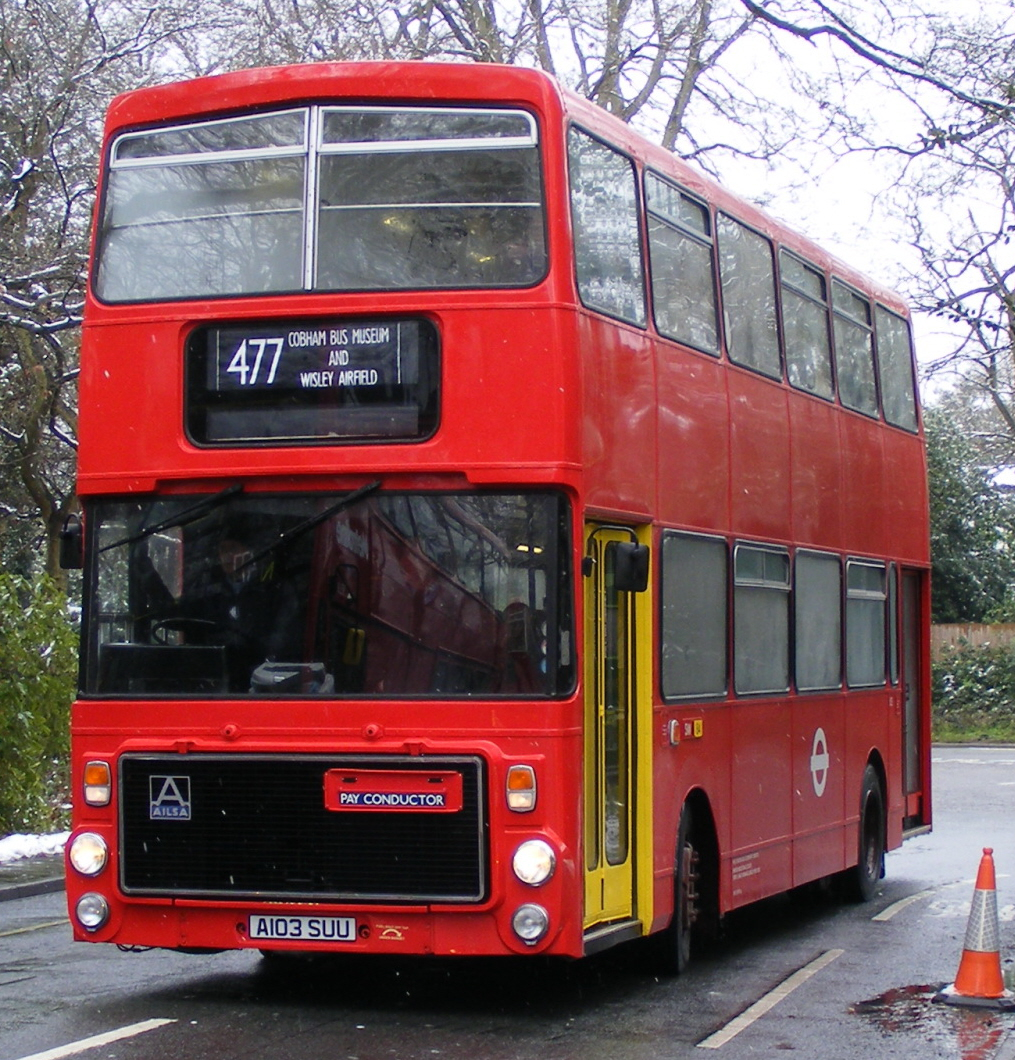
Preserved former London Transport Alexander RV bodied Volvo B55 in April 2008

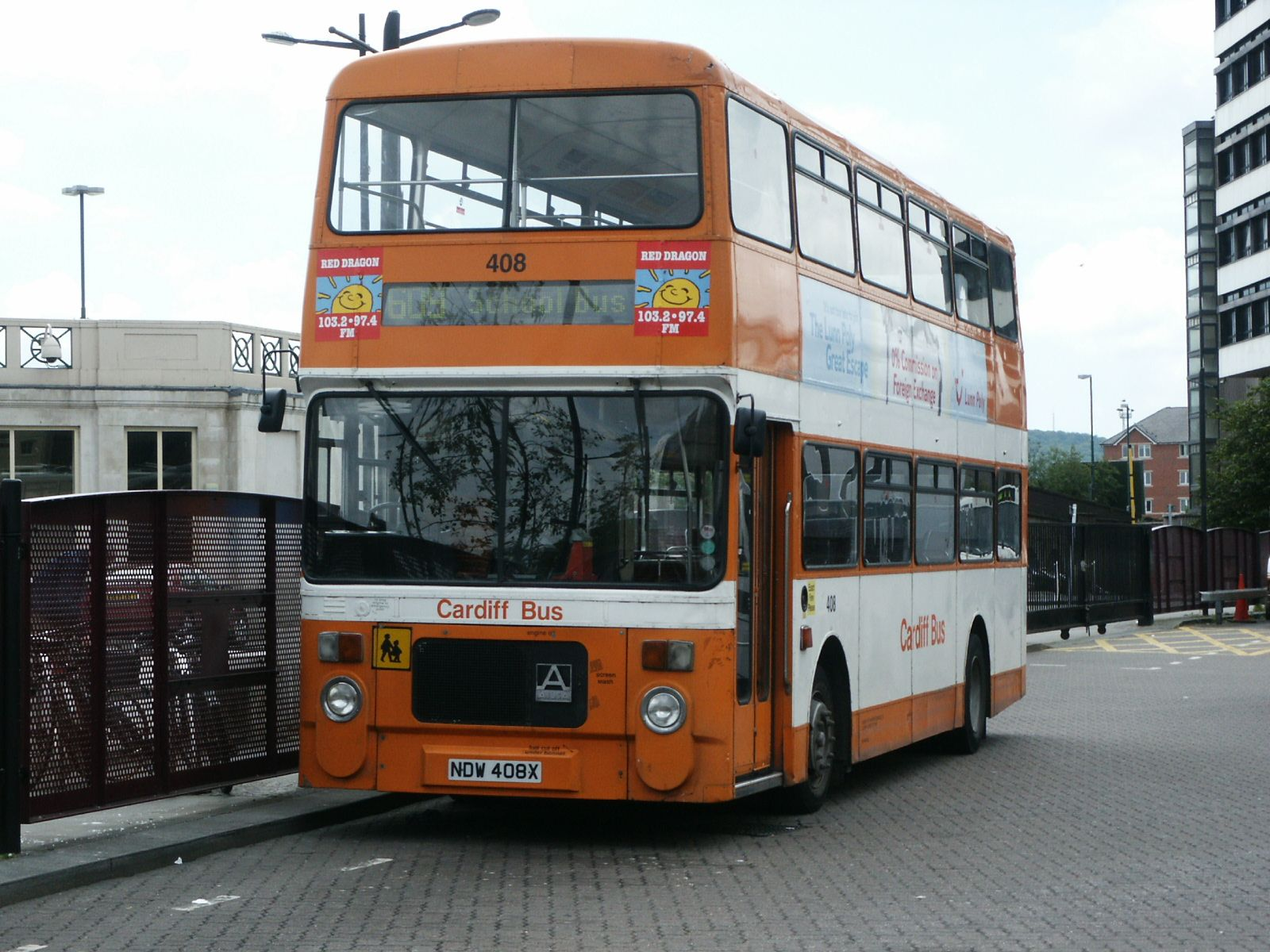
Cardiff Bus Northern Counties bodied Volvo B55 in June 2002

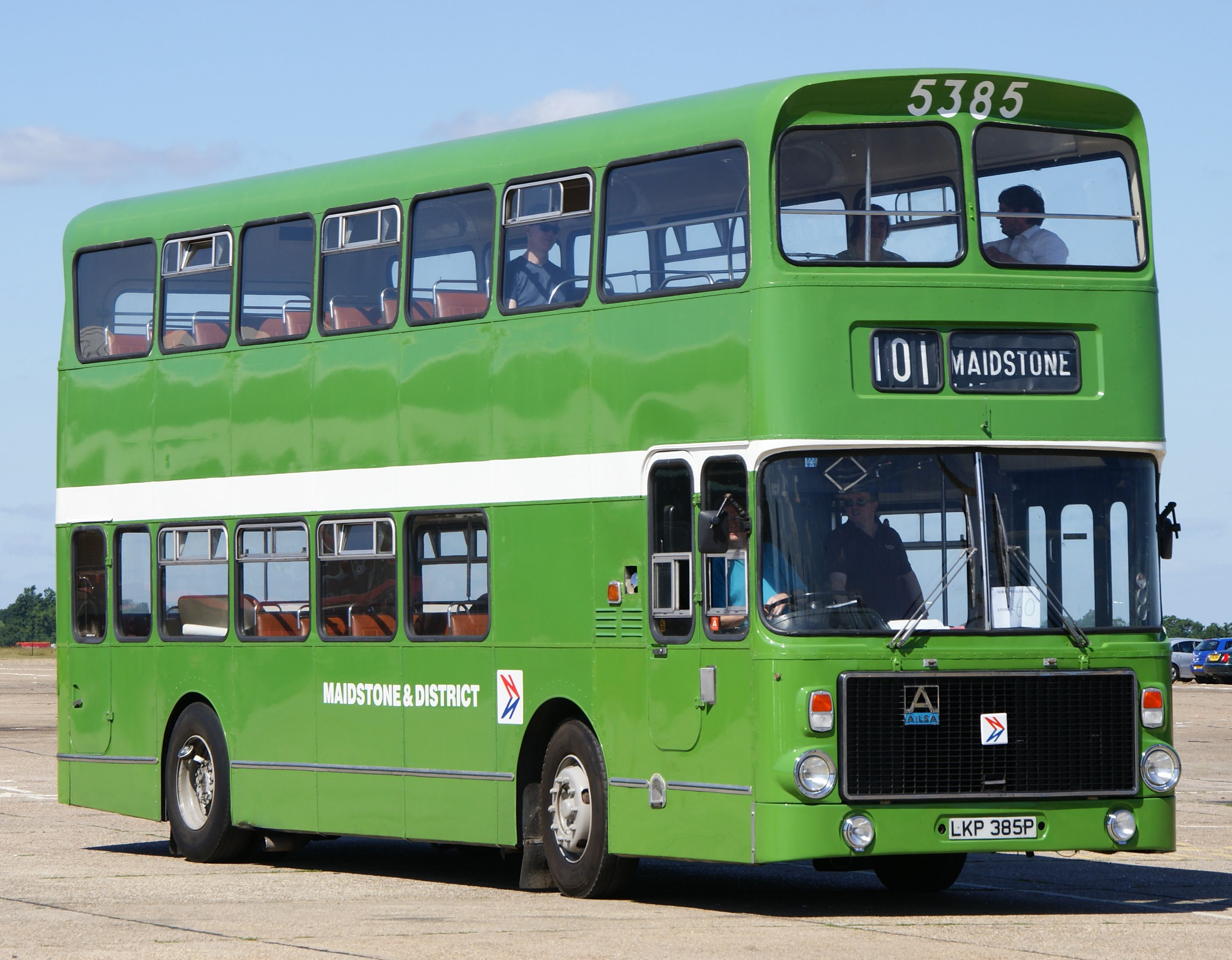
Preserved Maidstone & District Motor Services Alexander AV bodied Volvo B55 in July 2010

In June 1972, Volvo bought a 75% shareholding in Irvine based truck importer Ailsa Trucks Ltd, transforming the company into a subsidiary of Volvo that imported larger numbers of vehicles and kept higher numbers of spare parts in stock. The following August, a new company, Ailsa Bus Ltd, was formed to market imported Volvo buses to operators in the United Kingdom, with development of a front-engined double-decker bodied by Walter Alexander Coachbuilders of Falkirk commencing at Ailsa Bus in 1973.

The Ailsa B55, produced at Ailsa's Irivne facility and debuting at the 1973 Scottish Motor Show, was designed with a front-mounted engine that still allowed a front entrance position suitable for one-person operation, similar in nature to the earlier Guy Wulfrunian. The B55 was fitted with the Volvo TD70 engine, a compact turbocharged unit of 6.7 litres (1.5 imp gal; 1.8 US gal), with a suspension consisting of beam axles and leaf springs. A Self-Changing Gears five-speed semi-automatic gearbox was also used. High-capacity tri-axle and single-deck variants were also offered for the export market, however no examples of the latter were ever produced, and a prototype low height B55, designated B55-20 (instead of the standard B55-10), was built for Derby Borough Transport in 1975.

In 1977, a Mark II Ailsa was launched, with Voith D851 transmission with retarder introduced alongside the Self-Changing Gears transmission. The Mark II was followed in 1980 by the Mark III, with Ailsa badging dropped in favour of Volvo badging, This continued to use the Volvo TD70H turbocharged engine, although it utilised a Volvo F10 truck rear axle with an offset differential in place of the previous hub reduction axle. Air suspension was also made available as an option.

Following the end of production in 1985, the Ailsa B55 was effectively replaced by the mid-engined Volvo B10M Citybus.

== Operators ==
The Ailsa B55 type was particularly popular with the Scottish Bus Group (SBG): of all the constituent divisions, Northern and Lowland were the only ones never to adopt the Ailsa into their fleets. The two most keen SBG subsidiaries were Fife Scottish and Eastern Scottish: Fife purchased 74 Ailsas in total, while Eastern bought 40 examples as new (30 of them the Mk III variant with Alexander RV body) and a further 43 second-hand from other operators. Overall, the SBG received 192 Ailsa deliveries from 1975 to 1984. Beyond the SBG, Strathclyde PTE was a significant buyer of the Ailsa, but not until the introduction of the Mk III. By far the most enthusiastic supporter of the Ailsa, however, was Tayside Regional Council, who bought 161 examples for use on their Dundee city services between 1976 and 1984, with four different body types, Alexander AV and RV, Northern Counties and East Lancs.

The B55 was popular with the passenger transport executives, with significant purchases made by West Midlands and South Yorkshire and to a lesser degree, Merseyside and Tyne & Wear. Other customers included Cardiff Bus, who purchased 36 new with Northern Counties bodywork between 1981 and 1984 as well as acquiring second-hand examples, as well as National Bus Company subsidiary Maidstone & District Motor Services for operational trials against the Bristol VRT and the Scania Metropolitan; the Ailsas proved unpopular there with both passengers and employees, the latter of whom went on strike in the summer of 1976 due to poor ventilation inside the bus, and were withdrawn by 1983. Ayrshire independent operator A1 Service, whose operating area included Ailsa's Irvine factory, also purchased several Ailsa B55s, increasing its fleet, where it could, through the purchase of used vehicles.

As part of its Alternative Vehicle Evaluation programme, London Transport took delivery of three Mark III vehicles in 1984. The programme was intended to evaluate alternative vehicle types for future fleet replacement in London, which, at that time, was purchasing Leyland Titans and MCW Metrobuses. One of these, numbered V3 in the London Transport fleet, was built with an exit door behind the rear axle and a second staircase adjacent. No further orders for new B55s were placed by London Transport, but numerous second-hand examples were purchased from the South Yorkshire and West Midlands PTEs in the late 1980s.

A solitary Ailsa chassis was bodied as a single-deck bus by Marshall for Strathclyde PTE. Later, the same operator created a second single-decker, by converting an Alexander-bodied double-decker, the upper deck of which had been damaged.

In all, just over 1,000 B55s were built, 890 of them being bodied by Walter Alexander. Of the remainder, 64 Ailsas received unusual Van Hool McArdle bodies built in Dublin - 62 buses for the South Yorkshire PTE and two for A1 Service, Ayrshire. Northern Counties bodied some for Derby Corporation and Cardiff Bus, a total of 35 were also bodied by East Lancs Coachbuilders for Tayside, and a small number were also bodied by Marshall for Strathclyde and Derby Corporation.

The last significant number of Ailsas in service in the UK were operated by Cardiff Bus, who maintained 18 of the type in regular service by 2007 following extensive refurbishment. They were withdrawn on 15 December 2007.

=== Exports ===
A number of 2-axle Ailsa B55s were sold overseas. The Indonesian Ministry of Transportation took delivery of 385 Ailsa B55s for use by DAMRI in Jakarta between 1981 and 1985, with both body and chassis assembled in knock-down kit form at local Volvo importer PT lsmac's premises. China Motor Bus in Hong Kong received eight Ailsa B55s between 1975 and 1978, although six of these buses were subsequently destroyed by fire, and one B55 was and another B55 was exported to the Philippines for demonstration use with the Bangkok Mass Transit Authority, later being exported to Singapore as a demonstrator for Singapore Bus Services and eventually sold to an operator in Hong Kong.

In 1981, a 3-axle version, featuring a self-steering rear axle developed from Volvo's F10 and F12 trucks to aid with manoeuvrability, was developed to meet the demand for 3-axle buses in Asia. A total of three 3-axle Ailsa B55s were built for export, with two sold to China Motor Bus as demonstrators and the third exported to Indonesia.
