= Eastern Scottish =

Bus operator in eastern Scotland

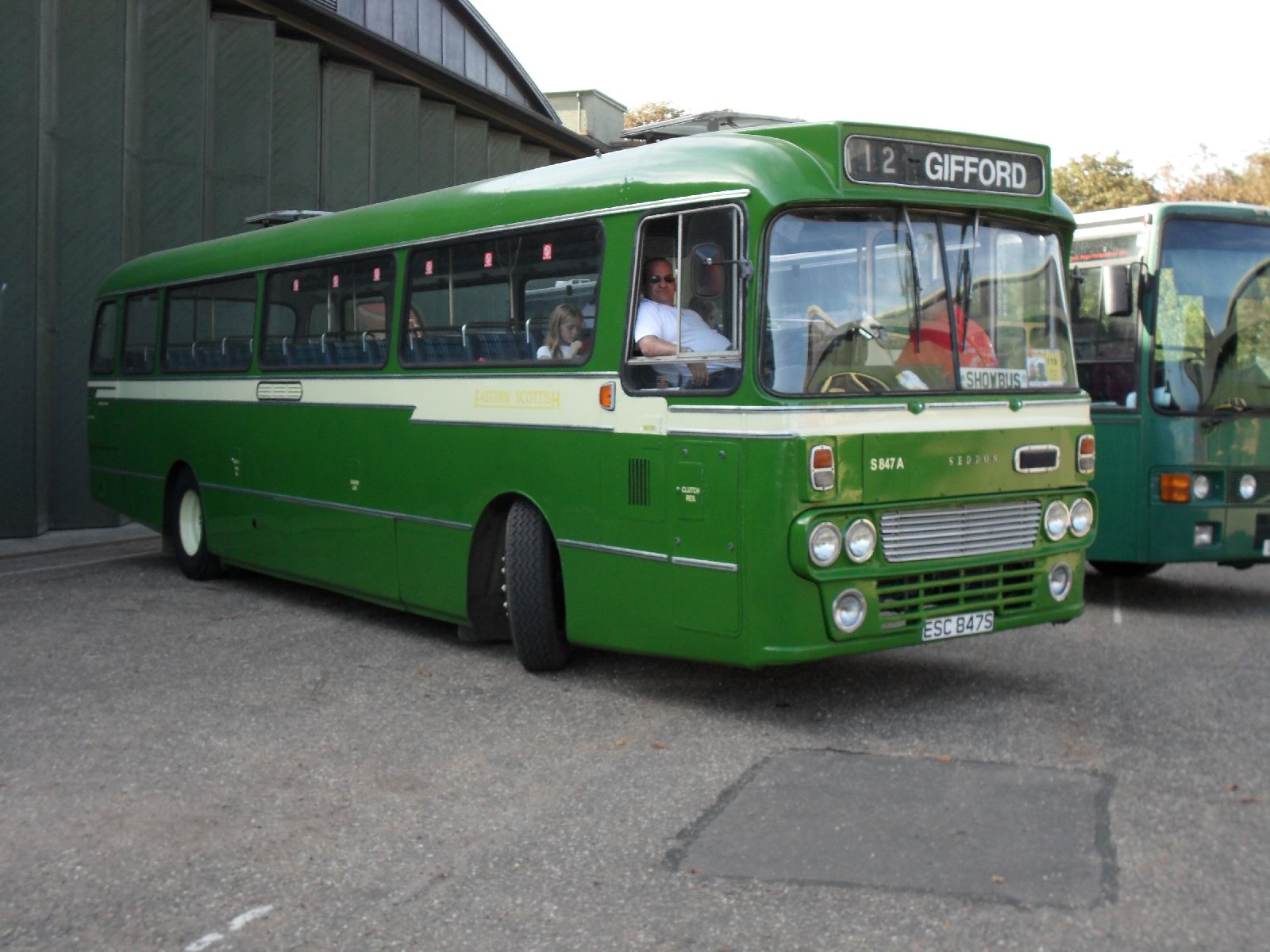
- Preserved Alexander AY bodied Seddon Pennine VII at Showbus 2009
- Parent: Scottish Bus Group (1985–1990); Employee owned (1990–1994); GRT Group/FirstBus (1994–1996)
- Founded: June 1985; 41 years ago
- Ceased operation: 1996; 30 years ago
- Headquarters: Edinburgh, Lothian, Scotland
- Locale: Edinburgh and the Lothians
- Service type: Bus and coach
- Fleet: 370 (October 1994)

Eastern Scottish Omnibuses Ltd. was a bus and coach operator based in Edinburgh, Scotland and a subsidiary of the Scottish Bus Group (formerly SMT Group). Eastern Scottish was formed in June 1985 from the main part of Scottish Omnibuses Ltd., which had itself traded as 'Eastern Scottish' since the 1960s. Following privatisation in 1990 the company traded as 'SMT' reviving the original name of the company (Scottish Motor Traction). It operated until 1994, when it became part of the GRT Group.

== History ==
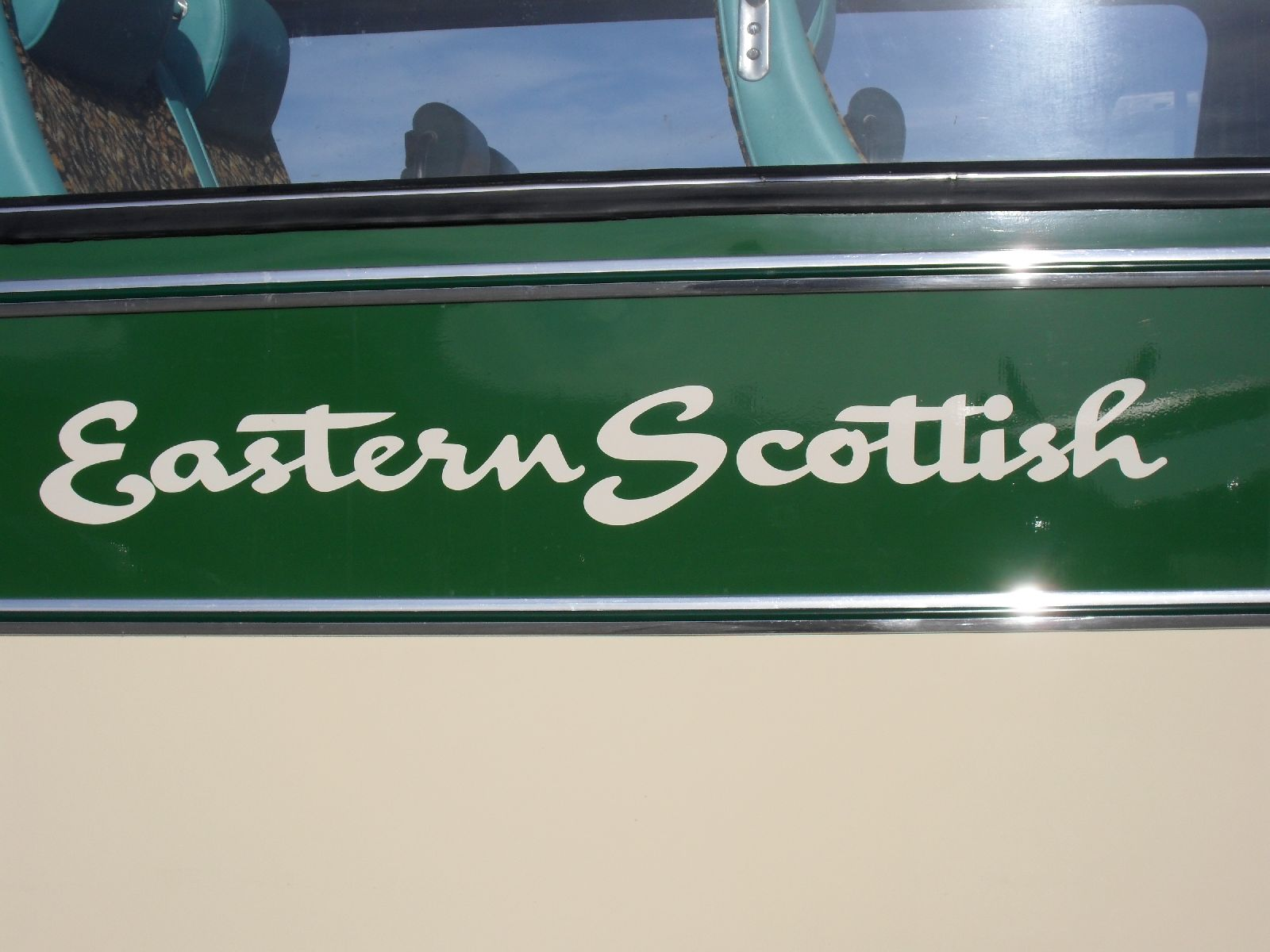
The original 1964 'Eastern Scottish' fleetname on the offside of a preserved Leyland Leopard coach

The Scottish Motor Traction Company Ltd. (trading as "SMT") was formed in 1905, and expanded quickly through a series of takeovers to become the principal bus operator in south east Scotland. By the 1930s, SMT was also the parent company of the SMT Group, whose other subsidiaries operated buses elsewhere in Scotland. In 1949, the SMT Group's bus operations were nationalised by transfer to a new British Transport Commission subsidiary, Scottish Omnibuses Ltd., although the SMT name remained in use until the early 1960s in the east, and was retained even longer in the Western SMT and Central SMT operating units of the Scottish Bus Group. Subsequently, "Scottish Omnibuses", "Scottish", and then "Eastern Scottish" fleetnames were used.

With nationalisation, some rationalisation of SMT Group operations took place. The SMT Company's isolated operations in the Dundee area did not pass to Scottish Omnibuses, but instead passed to sister company W. Alexander & Sons Ltd. In the Edinburgh area, this history resulted in SMT/Eastern Scottish retaining the right to carry passengers within the city boundary (contrast Glasgow where only pickup outward and set-down inward were permitted). The cessation of tramway operation in Edinburgh (which at one time extended through Musselburgh to Port Seton) was accompanied by service reallocations, making Musselburgh exclusive to SMT/Eastern Scottish, and takeover of Gilmerton services by the corporation buses, albeit with competition from Eastern Scottish's Birkenside and some Rosewell services.

In 1958, Lowland Motorways of Glasgow was taken over, with various local services in the east side of the city. Another acquisition in the west of Scottish Omnibuses' territory was Baxter's Bus Service of Airdrie in 1962, with local services in the Airdrie and Coatbridge areas. These purchases significantly increased the company's presence in the Lanarkshire and Glasgow area. The final significant takeover was that of Stark's Motor Service of Dunbar in 1964. Stark's had operated some of its services jointly with Scottish Omnibuses for some years, and a proportion of its fleet was already painted in SMT livery.

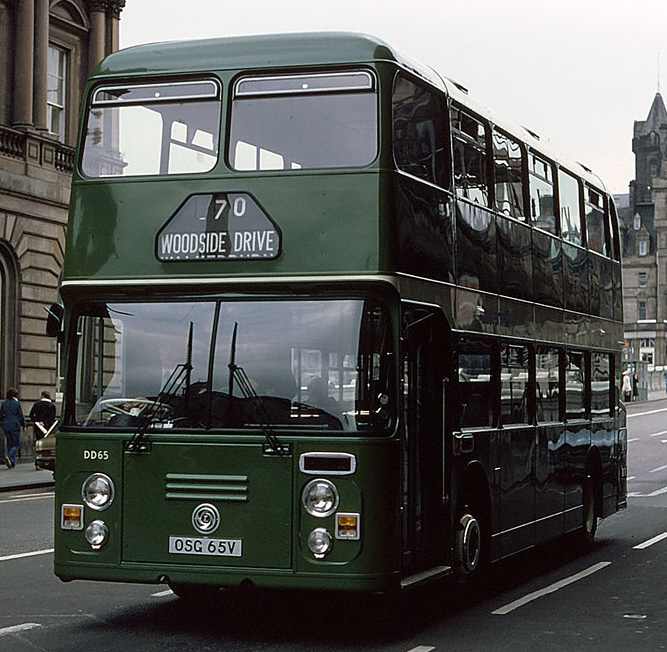
ECW bodied Leyland Fleetline in Edinburgh in September 1979

When the Baxter's business was acquired, adverse public reaction to the repainting of buses into Scottish Omnibuses livery led to a decision to retain the Baxter's identity and blue livery for buses based at Victoria depot and used on town services around Airdrie and Coatbridge. The Stark's livery, a lighter shade of green than that used by Scottish Omnibuses, was retained for buses at Dunbar and North Berwick. Both local identities disappeared in the late 1970s when the SBG's new corporate fleetname style was introduced ("Eastern SCOTTISH", with a saltire logo).

SMT and Scottish Omnibuses had long been a major operator of long-distance coach services, usually in cooperation with English operators such as Grey-Green, Midland Red and Ribble Motor Services, using the Eastern Scottish fleetname and green/cream livery. Dual-purpose coaches were prefixed Z and carried a 50/50 green/cream livery, and tour coaches were prefixed Y and carried a majority cream livery. A marketing feature was the operation of 2 and 3 day tours between London and Edinburgh, available as single or return journeys. This business was supported by a permanent sales office in London, operated by Eastern Scottish-uniformed staff.

A unique black/yellow livery on Bristol REMH vehicles serving Edinburgh-London in the 1970s. Western SMT, with fleetname Western Scottish, paralleled this service from Glasgow, using identical vehicles in a black/white livery. From the mid-1970s Scottish Bus Group policy increasingly saw such services operated with a corporate SBG identity rather than the individual names and liveries of the subsidiary operating companies. Initially, SBG coaches used on express services to London received a special blue and white livery with "SCOTTISH" branding; in the early 1980s most other express services were branded "Scottish Citylink" with a two-tone blue and yellow livery.

Eastern Scottish converted fully to one-person operation in December 1982, with the last seven bus conductors being made redundant at Linlithgow depot after working a service between Edinburgh and Stirling.

=== Deregulation ===
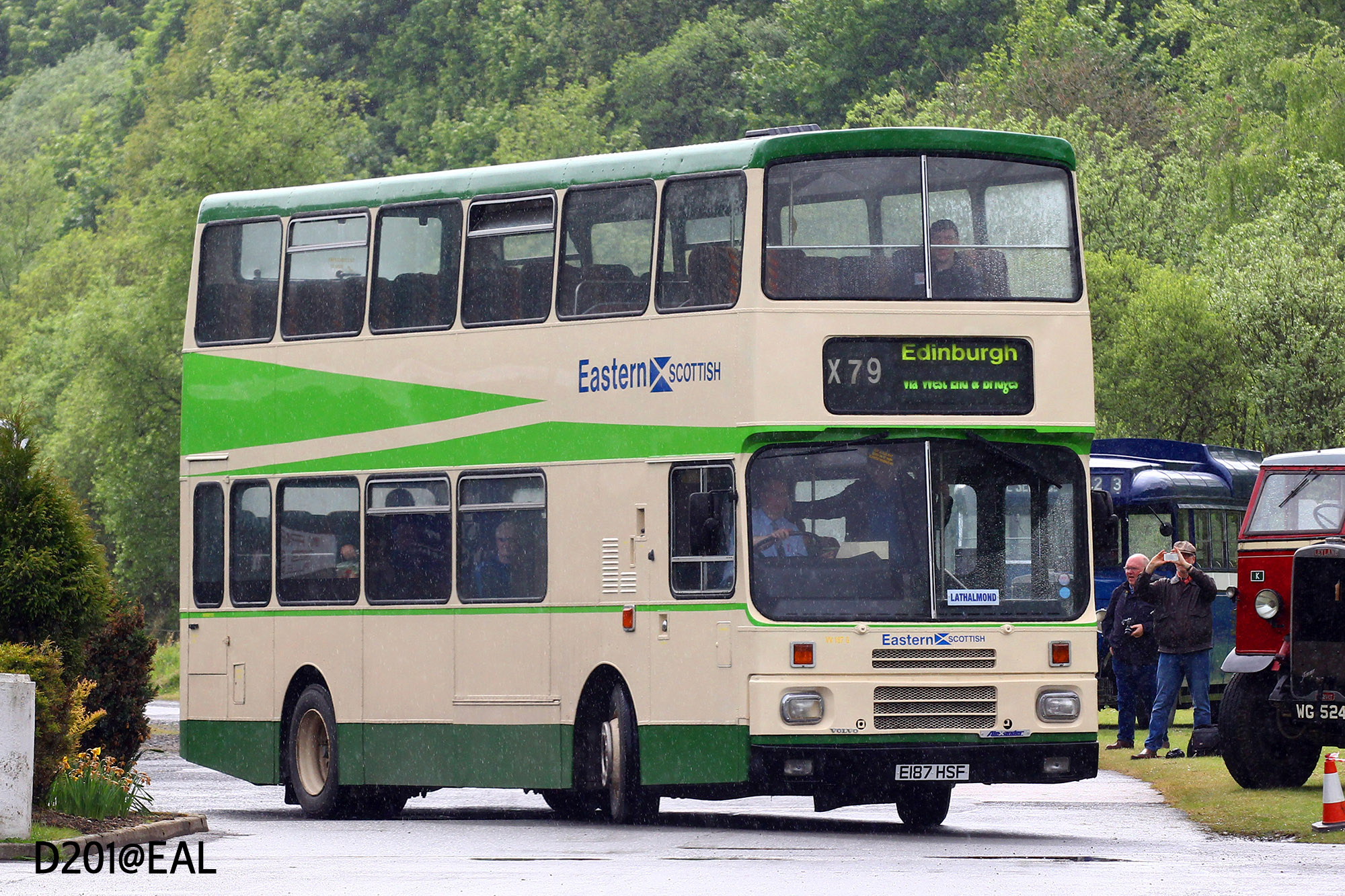
Preserved Alexander bodied Volvo Citybus in deregulation livery at the Scottish Vintage Bus Museum in May 2017

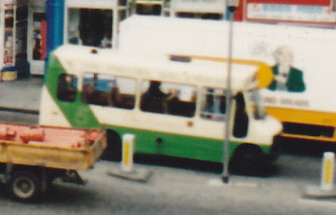
Unidentified Dodge S56 minibus on one of the post-deregulation company's City Sprinter services in Edinburgh in July 1988

In June 1985, in preparation for both bus deregulation in October 1986 and the eventual break-up of the group, the Scottish Bus Group was reorganised. Scottish Omnibuses was heavily affected by this reorganisation:

- Depots in Berwick, Dunbar, Galashiels, Hawick, Jedburgh, Kelso, North Berwick and Peebles passed to a new company, Lowland Scottish
- Airdrie (Clarkston) depot passed to Central Scottish
- Linlithgow depot passed to Midland Scottish
- Baillieston depot was closed, its vehicles and operations transferred briefly to the Stepps depot of Midland Scottish, pending further reorganisation to create Kelvin Scottish
- The licences for express coach services passed to a new separate Scottish Citylink company
- Marine Works passed to another new SBG subsidiary company, SBG Engineering

The remnant of Scottish Omnibuses, consisting of the core of the former company's territory in the Lothians area, was renamed Eastern Scottish Omnibuses Ltd. Upon formation, Eastern Scottish retained the traditional green and cream livery for its fleet and had depots at Bathgate, Dalkeith, Edinburgh, Livingston, Musselburgh and a sub-depot at Biggar, which closed in 1986.

Upon deregulation, Eastern Scottish faced little to no competition outside Edinburgh, despite the operator having a highly urbanised operating area. Within Edinburgh, however, Eastern found itself in conflict with the larger, dominant city operator, Lothian Regional Transport (LRT), for a larger share of the city traffic. In late 1986, Eastern introduced nine new routes within Edinburgh, some of which closely mirrored sections of existing LRT routes. These were numbered C1-C9, the minibuses carried the "City Sprinter" fleet branding. These routes were usually operated using a fleet of 70 Dodge 50 Series minibuses.

LRT retaliated by extending services beyond the city boundary and deeper into Eastern's operating area. Together with the loyalty of the passengers to the operator and legislative actions by Lothian Regional Council, who owned LRT, competitive tactics ensured that Eastern made no significant inroads to the city market. Despite competition between the two operators, "bus wars" that broke out in other cities and towns across Scotland were largely avoided, and Eastern did not persevere with loss-making operations but settled for economy by reducing use of St. Andrew's Bus Station, instead running through Edinburgh city centre to destinations such as Charlotte Square, Haymarket, Clermiston and Silverknowes. Eastern Scottish also connected traditional routes, such as those serving Balerno and Wallyford, end-to-end in order to create new cross-city links, which in some cases competed directly with LRT's own cross-city services.

=== Privatisation ===
Eastern Scottish was one of the most financially successful subsidiaries of the Scottish Bus Group, reporting an operating profit of £1.07 million (equivalent to £2,831,000 in 2025) in 1989. This was due in large part to initiatives such as the City Sprinter minibus scheme, which had quickly expanded into a considerable network of high-frequency routes, as well as the trial use of AEC Routemasters loaned from Clydeside Scottish. In 1990, the company became the fourth SBG subsidiary to be placed up for sale, and in September 1990, the company was sold in a management buyout for £9.5 million (equivalent to £23,492,000 in 2025), making it the most expensive subsidiary in the sell-off.

The company began trading as SMT once again under the SMT Omnibuses licence, reintroducing the traditional diamond logo on a modernised iteration of green and cream livery. Some investment in new vehicles followed, initially with the purchase of further minibuses, and a new series of premium 'quality corridors' branded as the 'Diamond Service' were introduced. Following the abolition of free bus fares for pensioners within the region, SMT entered into a dispute with Lothian Regional Council when the latter forced SMT to abolish 10p bus fares for pensioners in September 1991, reversing the decision a few months later, but resulting in a price war breaking out between SMT, LRT and the independent regardless. Following the resolution of the price war, SMT threatened to sue Lothian Regional Council in April 1992 after claiming subsidies for pensioners' fares were not being paid in full. Ultimately, competitive attacks on city routes using double-deckers were unsuccessful against LRT due to the economy of scale available to the latter, the lack of route coverage by SMT to make season ticket purchases attractive, and customer loyalty to LRT.

In October 1994, the GRT Group purchased SMT for £10.3 million (equivalent to £21,733,000 in 2025), beating a late £14 million (equivalent to £29,540,000 in 2025) bid by British Bus. After the GRT Group had merged with Badgerline to form FirstBus in 1996, the company, now trading as First SMT, was broken up and merged into neighbouring First subsidiaries Midland Bluebird and Lowland Omnibuses, which later merged to form First Edinburgh.

== Operations ==
From its head office on New Street, Edinburgh, Eastern Scottish had an operating area throughout the Lothians, in the east of Scotland, bounded by the Firth of Forth to the north and east, Fauldhouse in the west, and Gorebridge (Birkenside) in the south.

Eastern operated urban, interurban and rural services in and around Bathgate, Livingston, Dalkeith and Musselburgh, and services within the city of Edinburgh. Depots were also located in these towns.

Eastern was also active in the coaching business, operating day tours and private hires, as well as providing coaches for Scottish Citylink express from Edinburgh to Glasgow, Aberdeen, Inverness, London and many other locations throughout Scotland and England.

=== Depots ===
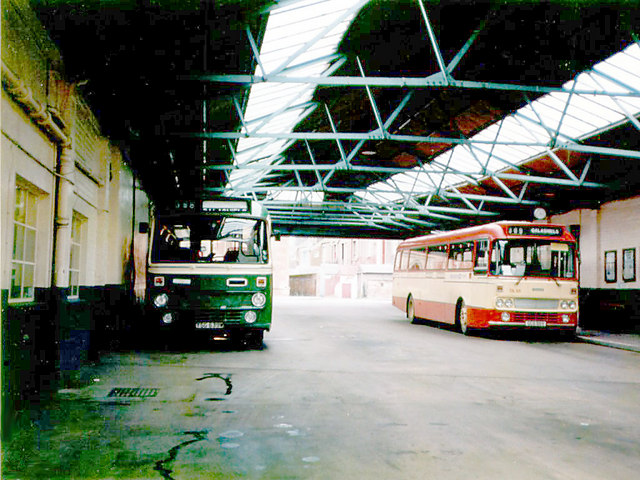
The former Eastern Scottish depot at Kelso in September 1985, shortly after being transferred to Lowland Scottish

Depot codes were introduced in the 1930s. At the time of nationalisation, the principal depots were:

- A Edinburgh (New Street)
- B Bathgate (Whitburn Road)
- C (formerly Dundee)
- D Galashiels (Duke Street)
- E Kelso (Roxburgh Street)
- F Linlithgow (High Street)
- G Dalkeith (High Street)
- H Clarkston Depot, Airdrie (Connor Street)
- I Broxburn (East Main Street)
- J Berwick-upon-Tweed (Marygate)
- K Peebles (Innerleithen Road)
- L (formerly Carlisle)
- W Musselburgh (Mall Avenue)

In addition to these there were several sub-depots in the Borders area, including Biggar (North Back Street), Hawick (Dovecote Street), Jedburgh (Castle Gate), Melrose (Abbey Street) and Selkirk (Mill Street). Changes to depots over the years included:

- 1957: Hawick elevated to full depot status (code L)
- 1960: new Baillieston (Station Road) depot opened (code C), partly to operate services taken over from Lowland Motorways
- 1962: new engineering works and body shop opened at Marine Gardens (Seafield Road), Edinburgh
- 1962: Victoria Depot, Airdrie (Gartlea Road) taken over with Baxter's business (code V)
- 1963: Melrose sub-depot closed
- 1964: Dunbar (Countess Crescent) depot (code S) and North Berwick (Tantallon Road) sub-depot taken over with Stark's business;
- 1966: Dalkeith depot replaced by new combined depot/bus station at Eskbank Road (code G)
- 1971: Selkirk sub-depot closed
- 1979: Broxburn depot replaced by new combined depot/bus station at Livingston (Almondvale South) (code N)
- 1979: Airdrie Victoria depot closed

== See also ==
- List of bus operators of the United Kingdom

== Bibliography ==
- Barker, Harry L. (2004). SMT Buses: The Buses of Scottish Omnibuses Ltd and Eastern Scottish. Newbridge: Bus Enthusiast Publishing Company. ISBN 9780946265367.
- Brown, Stewart J. (2016). Advancing in a Forward Direction: The Vehicle Purchases of the Scottish Bus Group. Fawndoon Books. ISBN 978-0-9934831-1-0.
- Burnett, John (1980). An Album of Eastern Scottish Buses. Sheffield: Turntable Publications. SBN 902844 55 5.
- Foster, R.T. (1989). An Atlas of the National Bus Company and the Scottish Bus Group Before Deregulation: Including London Regional Transport and Barton. Twickenham: DPR Marketing & Sales. ISBN 9780950991092.
- Hunter, D. L. G. (1987). From SMT to Eastern Scottish: An 80th Anniversary Story. Edinburgh: John Donald Publishers. ISBN 0 85976 159 2.
