= Glasgow Ballad Club =

Glasgow Ballad Club was a club that met for the study of ballads and ballad literature that ran from 1876 to 1987. The Glasgow Ballad Club was constituted in 1876, celebrating its semi-jubilee on 21 December 1902.

== Activities ==
The club met for the study of ballads and ballad literature, and for friendly criticism of original ballads and poems contributed by members. The Club produced several volumes of collected poems such as those published in 1885, 1898, 1908, 1924, 1952 which are in The Mitchell Library's Special Collections and can be consulted there.

== Notable Members ==
The founder and first president of the club was William Freeland. Freeland was a journalist for over fifty years, including at the Glasgow Citizen and Glasgow Herald. He later became editor of the Evening Times.

- Alexander Anderson
- George Eyre-Todd (local historian)
- Flora Garry
- Violet Jacob
- Nancy Brysson Morrison
- Neil Munro (writer)

== Publications ==
- Members of the Glasgow Ballad Club. (1885) Ballads and poems [first series] (Edinburgh and London: William Blackwood and Sons)
- Members of the Glasgow Ballad Club. (1898) Ballads and poems: second series (Edinburgh and London: William Blackwood and Sons)
- Members of the Glasgow Ballad Club. (1908) Ballads and poems: third series (Edinburgh and London: William Blackwood and Sons)
- Members of the Glasgow Ballad Club. (1920) Ballads and folk-songs of the Clyde valley (Glasgow: John Smith & Son)
- Members of the Glasgow Ballad Club. (1924) Ballads and poems: fourth series (Edinburgh and London: William Blackwood and Sons)
- Members of the Glasgow Ballad Club. (1952) Ballads and poems: fifth series (Glasgow: David J. Clark Limited)
