= Dreda Boyd =

- Born: Etheldreda Holstein Boyd; 1879; Glasgow
- Died: 1975 (aged 95–96); Glasgow
- Known for: Writer and antiquarian

Etheldreda (Dreda) Holstein Boyd (1879–1975) was a writer and antiquarian from Glasgow. She was one of the first female members of the Old Glasgow Club.

== Family and Life ==
Dreda was born in 1879 in Glasgow. Her father was David Thomson Boyd, a merchant, and her mother was Letitia de Haven.

== Old Glasgow Club ==
The Old Glasgow Club, a male only club, was formed in 1900 to preserve the history of the city of Glasgow. In 1908, member John Ord proposed that ladies be admitted to the membership of the club. The motion was carried by 30 votes to 22. Dreda Boyd, who was introduced to the club by her uncle Sir John Stirling-Maxwell, was one of the first three lady members, alongside Helen C. Girvan and Mrs Mason.

== Provands Lordship ==
Dreda was secretary of the Provand's Lordship Club, which was founded in 1906 to preserve the building, a medieval historic house on Castle Street, Glasgow.

== Publications ==
- de Haven, Audrey (pseud) (1906) Maud Irving.
- de Haven, Audrey (psued) (1907) The Scarlet Cloak.
- John Feeney, Socialist: A play about a miner who opposed the war in Europe in 1915, taking a Marxist view of the war. After hearing about the atrocities suffered by Belgian refugees in the city, he changes his mind. The play was performed at the Pavilion Theatre (Glasgow).
- Wayside Musings Among the Hills (1930): A tourism article for Scottish Motor Traction Magazine.
- Ayont the Pentlands (1930): A tourism article for Scottish Motor Traction Magazine.
- Beyond St Mungo's City (1933): A tourism article for Scottish Motor Traction Magazine.
- The "East End" (1935): An article about the East End of Glasgow for Scottish Motor Traction Magazine.
