= Trams in Edinburgh =

Tram network in Edinburgh, Scotland

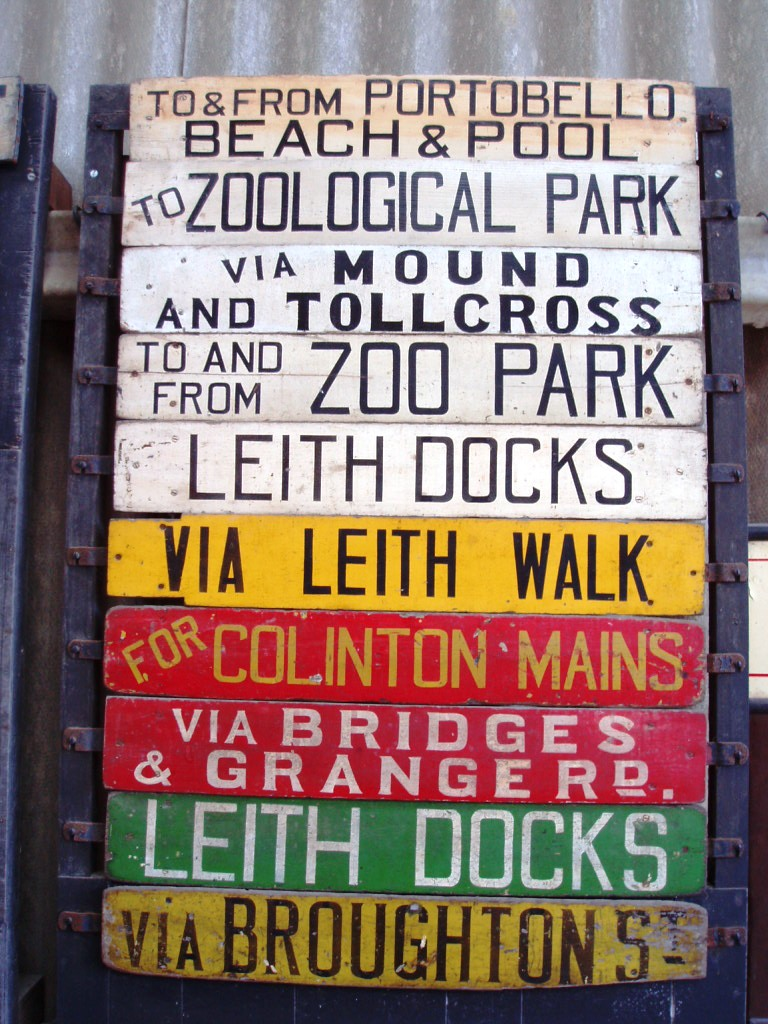
Edinburgh tram boards, Crich tram museum, 2006

Trams operated in Edinburgh from 1871 to 1956, and resumed in 2014. The first systems were horse-drawn, while cable-haulage appeared in the city in 1888. Electric trams first ran on systems in neighbouring Musselburgh (1904) and Leith (1905), meeting the Edinburgh cable-trams at Joppa and Pilrig respectively. Electrification meant cable trams last ran in 1923, with through running now possible to Leith and as far east as Port Seton. The various systems were operated by different private and municipal entities over the years; the Edinburgh and Leith systems had been merged under Edinburgh Corporation by 1920, but it wasn't until 1928, after the partial closure of Musselburgh line, that all trams operating in Edinburgh were in the sole control of the corporation. The last electric trams ran in 1956, but electric trams returned in 2014 with the opening of Edinburgh Trams. Many of the trams from the horse/cable/first electric era were built in Shrubhill Works. Two trams have been preserved, a horse tram and an electric tram, built by Shrubhill in 1885 and 1948 respectively. A 1903 Dick Kerr cable-tram has also been purchased for preservation. Remnants of the cable-tram system can be seen in Waterloo Place and Henderson Row, and of the Musselburgh line at Morrison's Haven.

== Timeline ==
- 6 November 1871: first horse tram service (Edinburgh Street Tramways)
- January 1888: first cable trams service (Edinburgh Northern Tramways).
- 20 June 1922: cable/electric boundary at Pilrig eliminated.
- 16 November 1956: last electric tram
- 31 May 2014: first new electric tram service begins

== Operators ==
- Edinburgh Street Tramways (1871-1904)
- Edinburgh Northern Tramways (1888-1897)
- Edinburgh and District Tramways (1893-1919)
- Leith Corporation Tramways (1904-1920)
- Musselburgh and District Electric Light and Traction Company (1904-1928)
- Edinburgh Corporation Tramways (1919-1928)
- Edinburgh Corporation Transport (1928-1956)
- Edinburgh Trams (2014–present)

== Traction ==
=== Horse trams ===
The first horse trams were introduced by the Edinburgh Street Tramways on 6 November 1871. After three years, the company had 32 horse-drawn tramcars in use. There were around 100 by 1894.

=== Cable-drawn ===
Use of horse trams was hindered in many areas by the steep gradients of the city, with some lines requiring teams of five horses to negotiate the terrain, and other routes were simply impossible to serve. The solution was found in the cable tram system, already in use in San Francisco - powered by a network of steam fired power stations, cables laid in conduits in the ground running at constant speed could be gripped and released as needed by trams, in order to stop and start, or otherwise adjust their speed. Edinburgh Northern Tramways began the first cable tram services in January 1888.

=== Electric ===
Electrification of the cable-trams began partly in mitigation of the effects of the unpopular merger of the Edinburgh and Leith burghs in 1920. Another factor was the susceptibility of the whole system to gridlock in the event of a single break in the cable.

The corporation's last electric tram ran on 16 November 1956.

=== The 'Pilrig muddle' ===
At Pilrig, the cable trams running along the busy Leith Walk route crossed the city boundary between Edinburgh and Leith. When the Leith system was electrified in 1905, passengers had to transfer between the two modes, in what became known as the 'Pilrig muddle'. This lasted until electrification of the Edinburgh system, with the first through tram running on 20 June 1922.

== Route networks ==
=== Edinburgh Street Tramways (1871-1904) ===
The Edinburgh Street Tramways Company was originally authorised by the Edinburgh Tramways Act 1871 (34 & 35 Vict. c. lxxxix) to construct tramways in Edinburgh, Leith and Portobello. Their first horse tram service began on 6 November 1871. It ran from Haymarket, via Princes Street and Leith Walk, to Bernard Street, Leith, replacing a horse-drawn carriage service.

=== Edinburgh Northern Tramways (1888-1897) ===
Edinburgh Northern Tramways began the first cable-hauled tram services in January 1888.

=== Musselburgh and District Electric Light and Traction Company (1904-1928) ===
The Levenhall to Port Seton section was replaced by motor buses.

=== Edinburgh Corporation Transport (1928-1956) ===
Expansion in the 1930s added routes Gorgie to Stenhouse, Braids to Fairmilehead and North Gyle to Maybury. At the time of closure, the total tram route was 47 miles long. The corporation's last electric tram ran on 16 November 1956.

\

=== Edinburgh Trams (2014-present) ===
After six years in which the controversial scheme suffered from long delays and over-spending, the new Edinburgh Trams system finally began operation on 31 May 2014, albeit on a single route from York Place in the city centre, west along Princes Street to the Airport.

== Remnants of the early systems ==
=== Electric tram track at Morrison's Haven ===
Near Morrison's Haven, a section of the Musselburgh line closed in 1928 survives. It is a part of a double-track loop about 58m in length and laid in setts, and was uncovered at some point for educational purposes. It is thought other sections still survive beneath the tarmacced roads.

== Trams in preservation ==
=== Edinburgh Street Tramways No. 23 (restored) ===
Edinburgh Street Tramways No. 23 has been preserved. Owned by the Edinburgh Horse Tram Trust, it's housed in the Scottish Vintage Bus Museum at Lathalmond in Fife. Built in 1885/6 by the company in Shrubhill Depot, it's an open top double-decker, which would have been drawn by a pair of horses. It cost £140, seated 36 (14/14) in longitudinal seats, and featured "decency boards" to hide ladies ankles when sitting on the top deck. It was fitted out to a high quality, with brass fittings, gold leaf and 14 blue etched windows each with a different design. Having been transferred to the Edinburgh and District Tramways in 1896, by 1900 it was withdrawn and ended up being used as a workmen's bothy building a house in Newtown St Boswells in the Scottish Borders, and then as a garden summer house/shed for the house. Local accounts also suggested it was a meeting place of the Wee Free congregation. It remained there for the next 100 years, its condition remained good thanks to several layers of paint, a ventilated brick plinth, and a corrugated iron roof. It was rediscovered after the owners investigated its origins. The Edinburgh Horse Tram Trust was established to restore it, and after being moved to one of Lothian Buses premises, restoration began in 2007, and after being moved to the museum in May 2011 for finishing work and painting into Royal Blue livery, the completed project was unveiled in August 2012. The restoration required substitution wheelsets and brakegear from an ex-Douglas IOM Horse tram to be used (the original wheels having been cast by local firm, Miller's Foundry on London Road). Recreation of the original fleetname was made possible as it had survived underneath later layers of paint. Since it has the same gauge as the new tram system, it was speculated the completed vehicle could once again run in its original home.

=== Edinburgh and District Tramways No. 226 (undergoing restoration) ===
Edinburgh and District Tramways No. 226 is undergoing restoration. Built by Dick Kerr of Preston in 1903 as a cable-drawn car, it was one of a batch of 20 for the company. Originally an open-top double-decker, it gained a light top cover in 1907. It was transferred to the Corporation in the 1919 change of ownership. It was rebuilt into an electric tram in December 1923. After withdrawal, it had its electrical and running gear removed, and was sold as a body shell, for further use as a holiday home in Hume, Scottish Borders. Upon rediscovery in 1987, due to being well maintained as a chalet despite being outside, it was determined by the National Museums of Scotland to be probably the best preserved double-deck ex-cable car in the world and therefore of considerable importance in the history of public transport. It was purchased jointly by the museum and Lothian Region Transport (the successor to the corporation and operator of Edinburgh's buses), and delivered in January 1988 to one of Lothian's Central depot with a view to a joint restoration.

=== Edinburgh Corporation Transport No. 35 (restored) ===
Edinburgh Corporation Transport double-decker No. 35 was retained by the corporation after the systems closure. It was built in 1948 by the corporation's own works in Shrubhill Depot. It was put on display in a small museum at the Shrubhill Depot for a number of years. It operated briefly at the Glasgow Garden Festival in 1988 and on the Blackpool tramway. By this time it was in a poor state of repair, so it was placed with the National Tramway Museum in Derbyshire on long-term loan, as a static exhibit. Having not run since then, and due to the lack of a suitable location to move it to in Edinburgh, and with the museum unable to restore a tram it didn't own, in 2006 the decision was taken by the council to gift it to the museum.
