= History of Lothian Buses =

History of bus company operation in the greater Edinburgh area in Scotland (UK)

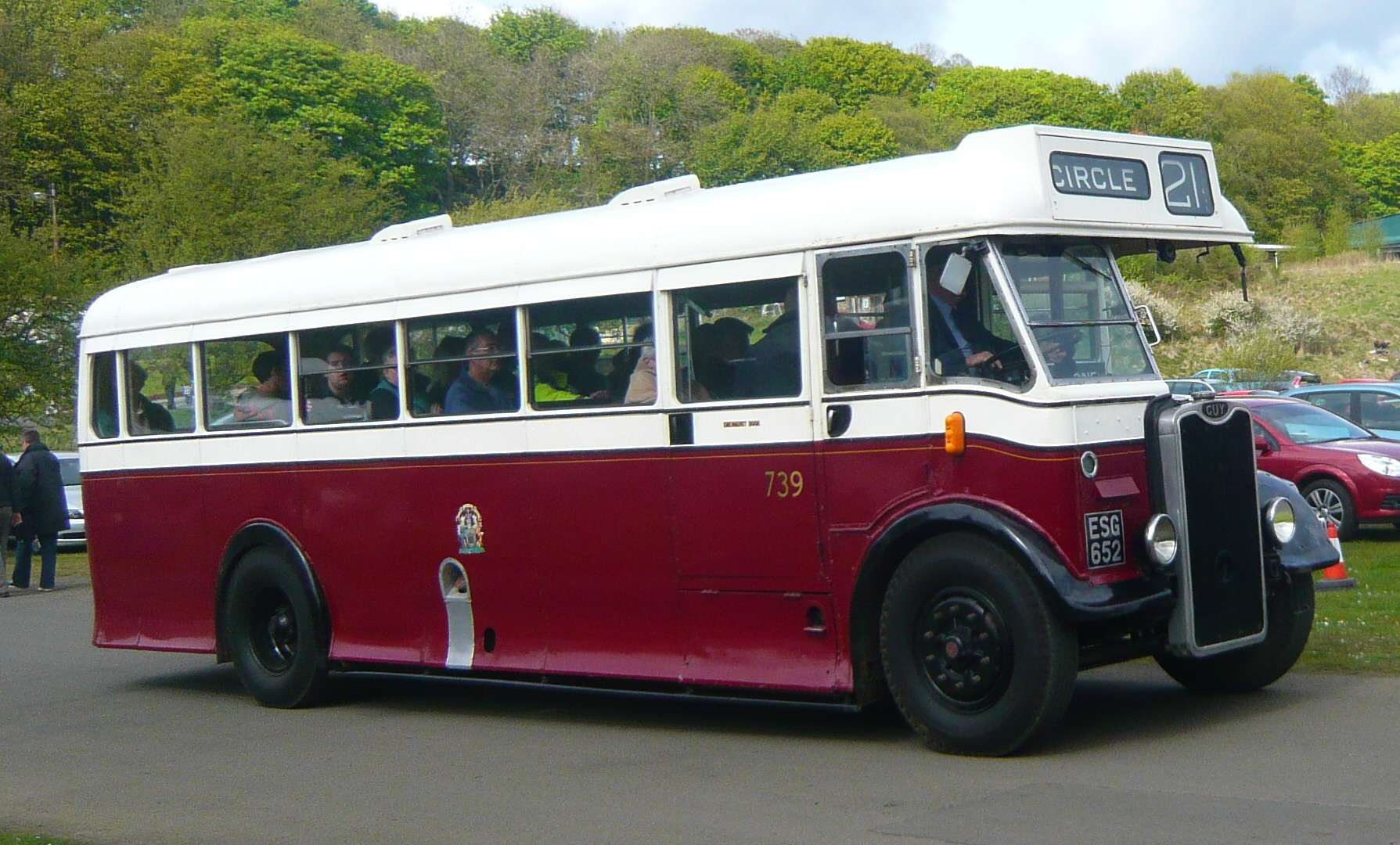
Preserved Edinburgh Corporation Metro-Cammell bodied Guy Arab at the Scottish Vintage Bus Museum in May 2010

Lothian Buses is the largest provider of bus services in and around Edinburgh, Scotland. It is entirely municipally owned, with 91% ownership by the City of Edinburgh Council and the remainder owned by Midlothian Council, East Lothian Council and West Lothian Council. Lothian Buses Limited is registered in Annandale Street, Edinburgh, with company number SC096849.

== Origins to 1956 ==
Several tramway companies were founded in Edinburgh in the late nineteenth century.

The Edinburgh Street Tramways Company was founded in 1871, initially operating a horse-drawn tram line from Haymarket to Bernard Street in Leith, a separate burgh from Edinburgh. Edinburgh and District Tramways took over the company's routes within Edinburgh in 1893 while the Leith Burgh Corporation took over routes within their boundaries in 1904, running them as Leith Corporation Tramways, leading Edinburgh Street Tramways to cease trading.

In 1888, Edinburgh Northern Tramways began operating cable-hauled tram services from George Street to Ferry Road and Comely Bank. They were also taken over by Edinburgh and District Tramways in 1897.

The Corporation of the City of Edinburgh (then the formal name for the city council) introduced a motor bus service in July 1914. This service was short-lived, with the buses requisitioned for wartime use, and services did not resume until after the First World War. In December 1916, the Corporation published a report they commissioned from various tram experts. Having only been tasked to report on the future of cable trams regarding potential expansion and alternative traction methods, it commented on the potential of the motor bus to substitute trams, concluding that tramcars' replacement with motor buses would incur a total loss of £39,425 per annum and that the bus only had a future serving thinly populated districts or acting as a feeder for trams. The report was heavily criticised by The Commercial Motor as being wholly one-sided, with fallacious assumptions, seeming to them a deliberate attempt to discredit buses. It recommended that the Corporation procure independent advice from those with experience running motor buses at the necessary scale. In contrast to the negativity of the tram experts, the Scottish Motor Traction Company was reportedly in good financial health, being able to both "pay the petrol tax and to make profits in Edinburgh and district." in the same year.

The City Corporation took over Edinburgh and District Tramways on 1 July 1919, forming the Edinburgh Corporation Tramways Department. At the same time, it began seasonal bus tour services around Holyrood Park using Leyland charabancs. The first post-war regular bus service began on 29 December 1919. It was extended in March 1920, supplementing the trams by running between Ardmillan Terrace and Abbeyhill via Holyrood Palace, the Royal Mile and the Castle. In March 1921, the route was extended again to Easter Road.

Edinburgh Corporation Tramways and Leith Corporation Tramways merged on 10 November 1920.

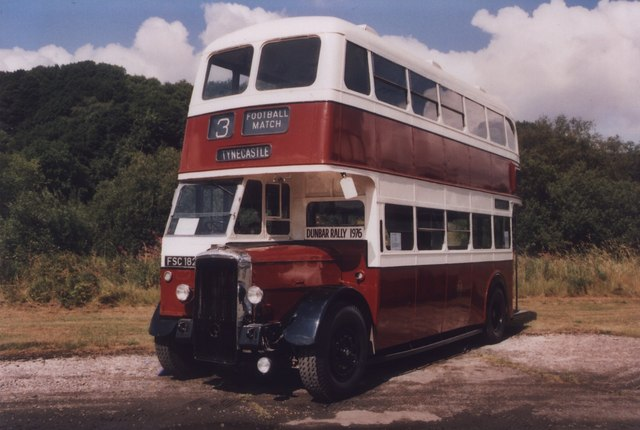
Preserved Metro Cammell-bodied Daimler CVG6 at the Scottish Vintage Bus Museum in August 2007

By the end of 1919, the corporation was applying to Parliament for legal powers to run motor buses 5 to 10 miles beyond the city boundaries. Fares for ordinary services were charged on a graduated scale based on distance – the higher the fare (charged by the penny, 1d, 2d, etc.), the further the distance. As of early 1922, 1d bought 1,033 yards, while 5d bought 4 miles 1,170 yards. Special services in the early 1920s included football specials (requiring as many as 30 extra buses) and late-night services to venues like the Marine Gardens ballroom, with the entrance fee included in the ticket. In the early years, buses and trams also carried parcels, working with a network of collection/delivery boys, with the head office acting as a sorting office.

By the end of 1920, the corporation was considering the replacement of northern cable tram routes with buses. By the summer of 1921, the number of buses and coaches using The Mound as an interchange was causing concern for the City Magistrates. By May 1921, the department manager was already crediting the buses' contribution to the city's transport system, which then also comprised cable and electric trams, preventing rate relief from being necessary. By early 1922, buses had replaced a quarter of the cable-tram network (approximately 6.2 miles).

In 1922, there were bus garages in Shrubhill, which had a capacity of 53 vehicles, and Henderson Row, which held up to 45. In 1926, the bus fleet moved into Central Depot on Annandale Street, a former Industrial Exhibition hall, which is still Lothian Buses' main depot today as of March 2025. Hoping for economies of scale, all of the Corporation's road transport fleet (including such vehicles as fire tenders and waste collection vehicles) were originally to be garaged in this depot.

Between 1920 and 1925, the experience of running buses at high frequency (every 3 mins) on busy city routes to temporarily replace cable trams exposed the early designs' weaknesses – the vibration issues (particularly bad due to Edinburgh's paved streets), the low capacity and narrow doors in comparison to trams, and the fact that, despite their speed advantage between stops, longer load/unload times often meant they were slower overall. In some cases, the buses were so unpopular they were removed and replaced with electric trams. On the other hand, they were showing their usefulness in other areas. Because of this, by 1925, the department's manager believed trams should be retained for the heaviest and busiest loadings but never for new routes with a frequency of less than 6 per hour, while buses would remain employed on routes either complementing or connecting existing tram lines or on routes that were unsuitable or uneconomic for trams. He nonetheless advocated for the bus as a necessary part of new housing developments such as Lochend, where revenue growth over time was evident and considered the vibration issue solved since the introduction of pneumatic tyres. He concluded that as both modes are so interdependent, they "should be considered as a single transport organization for the city."

The effect of solid rubber motor bus tyres on the road surface was an early issue. Reimbursement for repairing the damage to the roads in Holyrood Park by the tour charabancs was laid down as a condition of operating there in the 1921 season. In 1921, the city deputy surveyor found that no undue damage was being done by buses on tarmacked roads, with some not damaged at all, but water-bound macadam surfaces and sett paving without concrete underlay were vulnerable to rutting and other issues. On one hilly route, after residents complained of vibration caused by the buses, various remedies were deployed – limiting the speed to 8 mph, descent in gear, and fitting of super-cushion tyres (Dunlop and North British). The speed limit was also necessary for granite paved sections of running, which were extensive in Edinburgh.

This record of the early introduction of buses was hailed by The Commercial Motor in 1926 as a sign of the Edinburgh authority's foresight in recognising "the part which the motorbus was destined ultimately to play in the solution of the passenger transport problems of the age". This was contrasted with Glasgow Corporation, which, despite having twice the population of Edinburgh, had only begun bus services in December 1924.

In the early 1920s, batch-by-batch reliability of buses could be unpredictable and often required running adjustments. The combination of the build quality of early AEC vehicles and the professionalism of the Corporation's garage staff produced in-service mileage figures and engine life that The Commercial Motor praised as "exceptionally good". Measures taken included mandatory defect reporting by drivers at the end of each shift. This preventative maintenance regime called for inspection/repairs every 10 days (with the spare parts inventory including complete engines) with close monitoring of parts usage, and an overhaul/repaint cycle of every 18 months. To improve the system, the Corporation was modifying buses as early as 1921, experimenting with a new type of rear shock absorber using rubber pads on one of its Leylands and widening the doors of buses during overhaul. Examples of in-house innovation included a portable bus electrics testing apparatus in 1932 and the establishment of a soap-making plant inside the Laundry at Shrubhill depot in the 1940s, in response to the need for a soap which did not damage vehicle paintwork.

All horse and cable-operated trams on the network were fully electrified by 1923.

By 1926, there were 12 regular bus routes with a total mileage of 43 working to Bath Street, Blackford, Bonnington, Cameron Toll, Colinton, Cramond, Easter Road, Juniper Green, Hillend, Lochend, Newcraighall, Portobello and Surgeon's Hall. The average number of passengers per mile was just under 9, with the average fare around 1.6d.

Good loadings on an experimental night service run from October 1925 to April 1926 saw the Corporation make plans to introduce regular winter night services.

In the 1920s, the average speed of the bus fleet approached, and then surpassed, that of the trams. The change occurred some time in the window of the 1927/8 financial year – in the space of this period the average speed of the buses went from 8.25 mph to 9.5 mph, in contrast to the trams, which went from 8.5 mph to 8.76 mph.

In 1928, given the increasing importance of buses, the Edinburgh Corporation Tramways Department was renamed the Edinburgh Corporation Transport Department. In 1928, the Corporation introduced measures to ensure bus operators could not undercut trams, by insisting one-way fares on routes duplicating trams must be at least 1d (one penny) higher, and that other forms of ticketing must not be cheaper than equivalent tram travel.

Edinburgh was one of many corporation transport systems in the UK that began employing female conductors in large numbers during the Second World War.

Edinburgh Corporation's tram network was abandoned between 1950 and 1956.

== 1956 to present ==
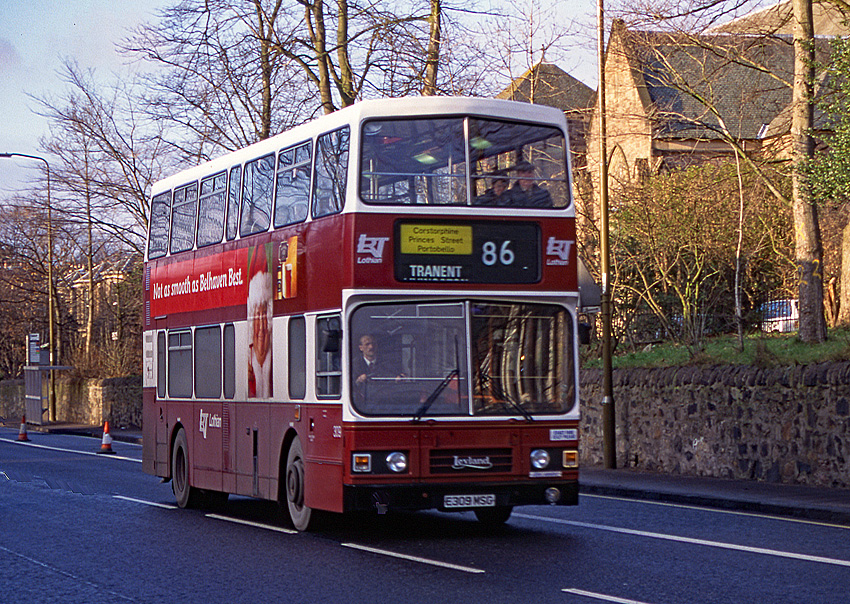
Lothian Regional Transport Alexander bodied Leyland Olympian in 1994

In 1975, under the local government reorganisation which followed the Local Government (Scotland) Act 1973, ownership of Edinburgh Corporation Transport passed to the Lothian Regional Council's Department of Public Transport. The operation was duly renamed Lothian Regional Transport.

The Transport Act 1985 deregulated bus services in Great Britain and required that municipal bus operations be run as commercial companies rather than as public service departments. Therefore, on 26 October 1986 the operation became Lothian Region Transport plc, better known by its initials 'LRT', a company wholly owned by Lothian Regional Council. Although the then-Conservative government had sought to have LRT privatised, with an offer being made for a management buyout of the company and interest in buying the company being expressed by Stagecoach Holdings, the privatisation of LRT was resisted by local Labour councillors. The Lothian Regional Transport identity was retained beyond the abolition of Lothian Regional Council on 1 April 1996, with 91% of the ownership of the company passing to the new City of Edinburgh Council and the remaining 9% distributed to the neighbouring East Lothian, Midlothian and West Lothian councils. The company was eventually rebranded to Lothian Buses plc on 6 January 2000.

Between June and August 2005, 1,400 Lothian Buses drivers associated with the Transport and General Workers Union (TGWU) staged strike action in a dispute over a conditional 5% pay increase, which saw services reduced to Saturday frequencies as drivers demanded an unconditional pay increase of 6.15%. The strikes escalated from overtime bans and one-day strikes to drivers eventually voting in favour of a continuous strike from 10 August. A one-day wildcat strike took place on the afternoon of 3 August, with passengers being abandoned as buses were taken out of service and returned to garages for three hours by striking drivers. The strike was resolved on 18 August after drivers voted to accept a 12% pay increase split over two years, with the TGWU conceding that the wildcat strike had lost the public's support for further strike action.

Lothian Buses set up a subsidiary company in December 2006 to operate a taxibus service to and from Edinburgh Airport, aimed at filling a gap in the airport transport market between conventional bus services and taxis. In September 2007 it was investigated by the Traffic Commissioner for selling illegal fares. Despite this it was extended to serve Leith, Ocean Terminal and Cameron Toll from October 2007. The vehicles used were Ford Transits. However, in February 2009 it was announced that the operation was up for sale as it had been operating at a loss despite carrying over 88,000 passenger in 2008. A buyer was not found and the operation was closed down in April 2009.

=== Sightseeing services ===
In May 1989, a private company called Guide Friday set up an open top bus tour called the Edinburgh Tour. Later that year, LRT set up the Classic Tour using open top Leyland Atlanteans as a direct competitor, also running competing Classic Tours in Guide Friday's English operations of Oxford, Cambridge and York; Edinburgh Corporation and LRT had operated tour services since the early 1920s, but with weaker branding. The Classic Tour buses wore a blue and white livery, each carrying a name e.g.Scottish Star, Lothian Star and Highland Star.

In July 2000, Lothian Buses became one of the first bus tour operators to join the City Sightseeing franchise model, rebranding and upgrading the Classic Tour. Lothian purchased the first purpose built low flow open top buses, painted in City Sightseeing livery. The Classic Tour was completely transformed into the City Sightseeing red scheme by May 2001. In 2002, Lothian Buses acquired both Guide Friday, its biggest rival in the tour bus market, and the smaller Mac Tours, which had been founded in 1998 and operated vintage bus tours, leaving Lothian Buses as the only tour bus operator in the city until the introduction of Bright Bus Tours by First Scotland East in 2019. All three tour brands were consolidated as one subsidiary company; Edinburgh Bus Tours. In 2004, Edinburgh Bus Tours introduced the Majestic Tour, serving the Royal Yacht Britannia and the Botanic Gardens.

=== Edinburgh bus war ===
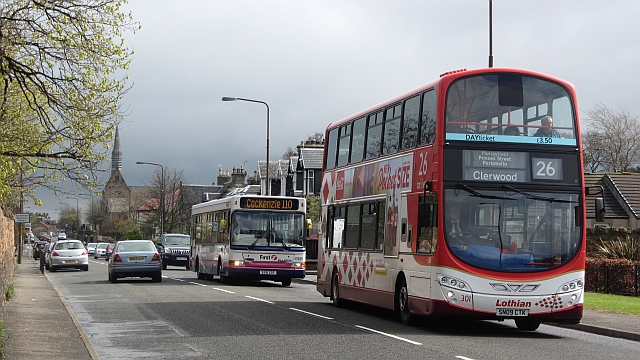
Lothian and First Scotland East buses in Cockenzie, East Lothian in April 2012, prior to the latter operator withdrawing services in the area

Post deregulation, Lothian experienced alternating periods of competition and stability with the other major bus operator in Edinburgh, First Edinburgh, and its previous incarnations SMT, who threatened to sue Lothian Regional Council in 1992 in a dispute over pensioners' fares, and Eastern Scottish, who LRT enquired about buying during the breakup of the Scottish Bus Group. During this time Lothian acquired a number of smaller Edinburgh operators.

In September 2001, Lothian reported First to the Office of Fair Trading (OFT), alleging anti-competitive 'bus war' practices including the introduction of a £1 fare, undercutting Lothian's own fares, and running multiple buses on four 'copycat' services numbered identically to existing Lothian routes. This claim was later rejected by the OFT, who ruled that First's competitive expansion in Lothian's operating area were a "reasonable commercial strategy from which passengers benefited". First Edinburgh withdrew their competitive £1 fare on 12 November 2001 following the launch of the OFT investigation, raising fares by up to 140%, and in July 2002, First withdrew its last competitive services in Edinburgh.

=== Regional expansion ===
One lasting effect of competition was the extension of Lothian services beyond the City of Edinburgh boundaries, in response to incursion by Eastern into Edinburgh city services. However, Lothian subsequently withdrew from West Lothian, leaving this area to First Edinburgh, with the sole exception of a night bus service between Longstone depot and Livingston, operated primarily for the use of staff who lived in West Lothian. Lothian's withdrawal from the area saw passengers travelling to the city centre face a day ticket fare of £3.60 the second-highest bus fare of any FirstGroup bus operation in the United Kingdom. During the time when the area was not served by Lothian Buses, West Lothian Council remained a shareholder of the company. From 2014, Lothian Buses services resumed running to the traditional boundaries of West Lothian after the company took over a contracted service to South Queensferry and Kirkliston; these towns, however, are located in the City of Edinburgh council area under present-day municipal boundaries.

On 15 August 2013, the City of Edinburgh Council announced the creation of Transport for Edinburgh, a new public body meant to oversee public transport in Edinburgh, including both buses and the new tram system. Transport convener for Edinburgh Council Lesley Hinds stated: "Our first priority will be integration between bus and tram services and we will have the executive directors of Lothian Buses on the board of the new organisation".

When First Edinburgh's regional successor First Scotland East announced the closure of its garages in Musselburgh and North Berwick in 2016, alongside the withdrawal of regional East Lothian bus services, Lothian Buses purchased the two garages and formed a new subsidiary named East Coast Buses, which commenced operations from 14 August. A year later in June 2017, Lothian launched a second subsidiary named Lothian Country, running commercial services to South Queensferry from St Andrews Square previous operator Stagecoach East Scotland withdrew the service for being economically unviable to run. Lothian Country has since expanded further across West Lothian to serve express corridors up to Bathgate, opening a new garage in Livingston, and replacing services in the area operated by the McGill's Group Eastern Scottish subsidiary following the latter's 2023 closure.

== Fleet history ==
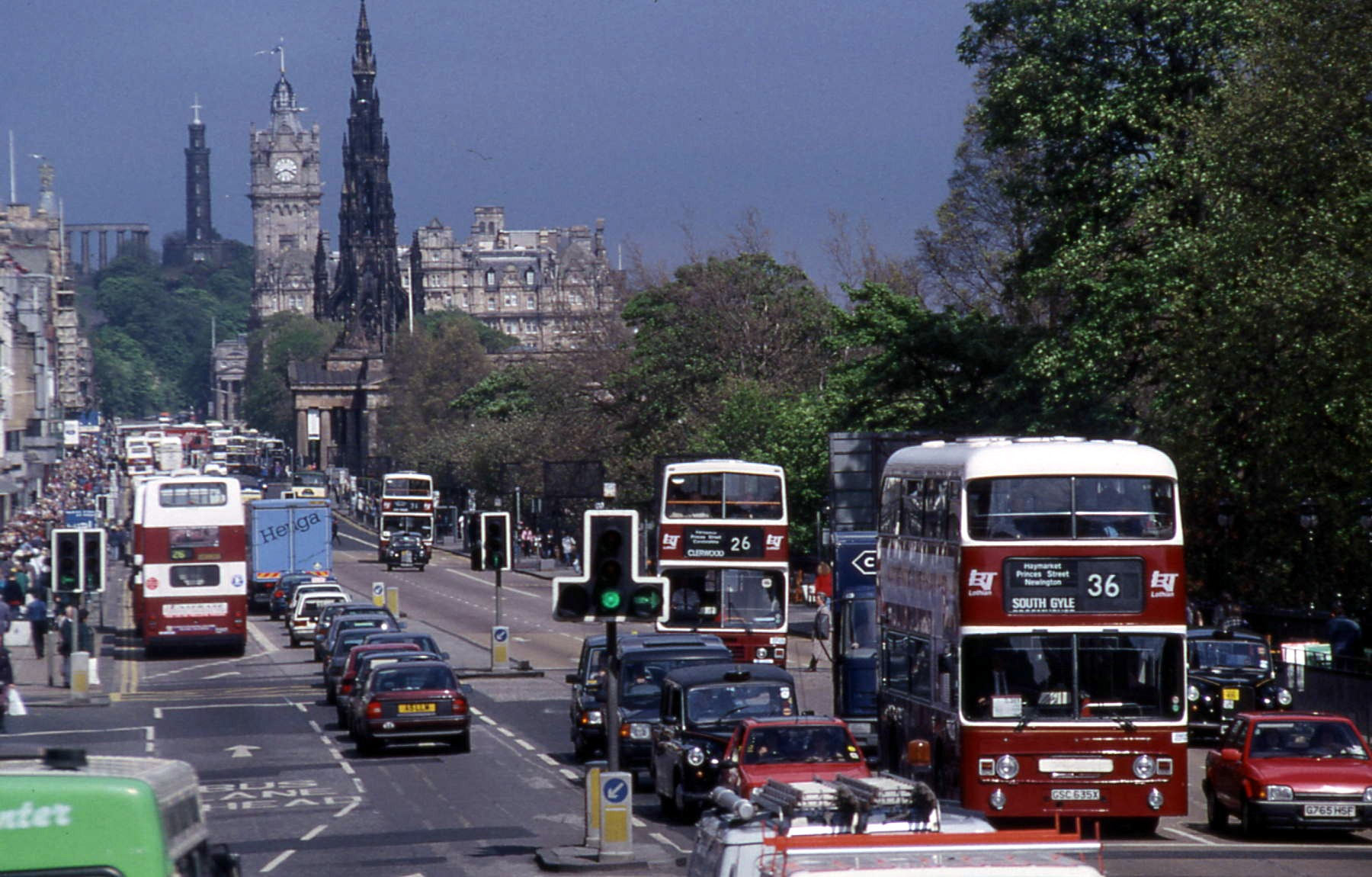
Lothian Regional Transport double-decker buses in traditional madder and white livery on Princes Street in June 1996

Edinburgh Corporation and Lothian have historically employed a high degree of standardisation of their service bus fleet, to facilitate maintenance savings. Double-deckers have long made up the majority of the fleet. Buses have generally been purchased new – relatively few secondhand vehicles have been operated.

From 1969 until 2001 Lothian favoured dual-door vehicles, which minimised loading times by allowing simultaneous boarding (at the front door) and alighting (from the rear door). With the exception of those bought for the Airlink service, all new double-deckers bought in this period had dual-doors, as did the Leyland National and Lynx saloons. However, in 2002 a decision was made to purchase single door vehicles only, apparently to stop fraudulent lawsuits claiming that the driver closed the rear doors while they were exiting. There is an ongoing programme of converting earlier low-floor dual-door vehicles to single door.

=== Early vehicles ===
In 1919, Edinburgh Corporation bought their first Leyland charabancs, for tour services. The Corporation was authorised to purchase 30 more buses in early 1920 for £25,000. By the middle of 1920, the Corporation had around 60 Leyland buses in service or on order. Of these orders, a 33-seat 'Edinburgh type' single-decker bus body with rear door and a separate smoking compartment at the back, mounted on a 4-ton 36–40 hp Model O chassis with worm drive axle, was exhibited at trade shows during the year, the Darlington Royal Show in June and the Commercial Motor Show at Kensington Olympia in October. This body type, in which the driver also had their own compartment, was already reportedly well-known and popular by 1921. One reason for the complete enclosure of the driver was to increase protection against the weather, which in Edinburgh could be considerably cold.

Some of the earlier rear entrance buses had narrow doors, which slowed down boarding/alighting. As a result, these were widened during overhaul. By early 1922, two Edinburgh type buses were in service with a centre door layout, i.e. between the axles. Featuring a wide door with a central hand rail, and signage directing passengers to board on the right of it and alight on the left, early indications were that this not only speeded up boarding/alighting, it increased the space available for standees.

By 1925, the Edinburgh type had further evolved to feature two doors, front and rear, albeit reduced to 31 seats. It was also now being fitted to 45 hp AEC chassis.

The early Edinburgh type buses required a driver and conductor to operate, but on lesser used routes, one-man-operation was also employed – for a 10 per cent increase in wages the rear door would be closed and the driver would collect fares on boarding via the front.

The early AEC and Leyland buses were reportedly up to the challenging task of route service in Edinburgh, which, due to its hilly terrain, was hard on engines, gears and brakes. To save on clutches, the AECs came with ratchet sprags fitted to the rear wheels (initially wire controlled, later modified to rod-control), with drivers instructed to deploy them at the bottom of hills.

Because the charabanc motor coaches were not in use in the winter months, some would be re-fitted with single-deck bus bodies and put into route service, while some of the remaining charabancs would be used in route service in case of extreme need. During the tram electrification programme, some were refitted with truck bodies to assist the works.

The first double-decker buses (open top, rear staircase layout) arrived in 1922.

Although growing in size both before and after, for the period of May 1925 to May 1926 the fleet size was static at a total of 88 buses in regular use, as follows:

- 71 single-deckers of the 31-seat Edinburgh body type (41 Leylands, 40 AECs)
- 2 double-deckers (54 seaters)
- 15 charabancs (nine 27-seaters, six 32-seaters)

During 1924 nearly half the fleet were converted to use pneumatic tyres (Dunlop & Michelin) instead of the earlier solid rubber or later Supercushion designs; by 1925 the Corporation had already determined based on both direct (price, life) and indirect (vibration damage, fuel consumption) cost comparisons, as well as the increased passenger comfort, to use them on the entire fleet. The issue of vibration was particularly serious in Edinburgh to the prevalence of granite paved streets. Conversion presented difficulty on the rear twin tyres on the AEC Model 507 double-deckers due to the maximum legal width (7' 6"), but this was overcome with in-house modifications.

In 1926 the Corporation had four 52 seat double-deckers on order from AEC.

To further solve the problem of lost time loading/unloading, by 1927 the corporation was stipulating two door bus bodies with wider doors, allowing simultaneous boarding and alighting – in through the rear (being at least 32' wide), and out through the front (28').

The presence of low bridges on almost all of the city routes implemented by 1927 prevented the use of double-deckers, and so attention turned to 6-wheeled single-deckers to meet the needs for extra capacity in rush hour. A batch of six such vehicles were bought from Karrier Motors, bodied by Hall, Lewis and Co. Designated the Type WL6/1, the chassis was the mandated maximum 30' length, but specially built with a longer 19' wheelbase to meet the requirement for comfortably seating 39. A 61–80 hp six-cylinder engine powered single tyres on both rear axle, with air pressure braking applying on all four driving wheels. These were half-cab buses, with the driver sitting in his own compartment to the front, beside the engine. The two doors were automatically controlled by the driver. A smoking area was still in use – achieved by a division in the body, with 17 smokers sitting in the rear section. The interior featured bucket seats, upholstered in green leather, with generous leg room. Comparative trials of the six-wheelers with the shorter single-deckers on the East Road had shown that, based on a working life of 8 years, the increased revenues generated by the larger buses offset the increased capital, licensing and petrol costs. This led to eight more being ordered.

Having recognised the advantages of operating modern buses, by 1928 the Corporation was already practicing the art of fleet replacement – with new deliveries displacing older buses which would then be disposed of.

=== 1930s ===
By May 1930 the fleet totalled 130 buses and coaches, the most recent arrivals being 14 AEC Reliance 95 hp 32 seater single decker buses of the "most modern" design. Dual-doored, the front was Simplex pneumatically controlled. The interior featured oak panelling throughout, Induroleum floor covering, chrome fittings, a Holt patent heater, and the bucket type leather upholstered seats. There was still a rear smoker's compartment, now just seating 10.

In 1932, the Corporation began trials to determine the fuel efficiency gains in using tar-oil mixed with petrol as a fuel, on petrol engined buses. This involved modifying a number of Leyland and AECs to use the Solex bi-fuel system, while a bespoke method was used on Daimlers.

By May 1934, Daimlers made up nearly half the fleet, which now totalled 152 buses and coaches.

=== Double deckers ===
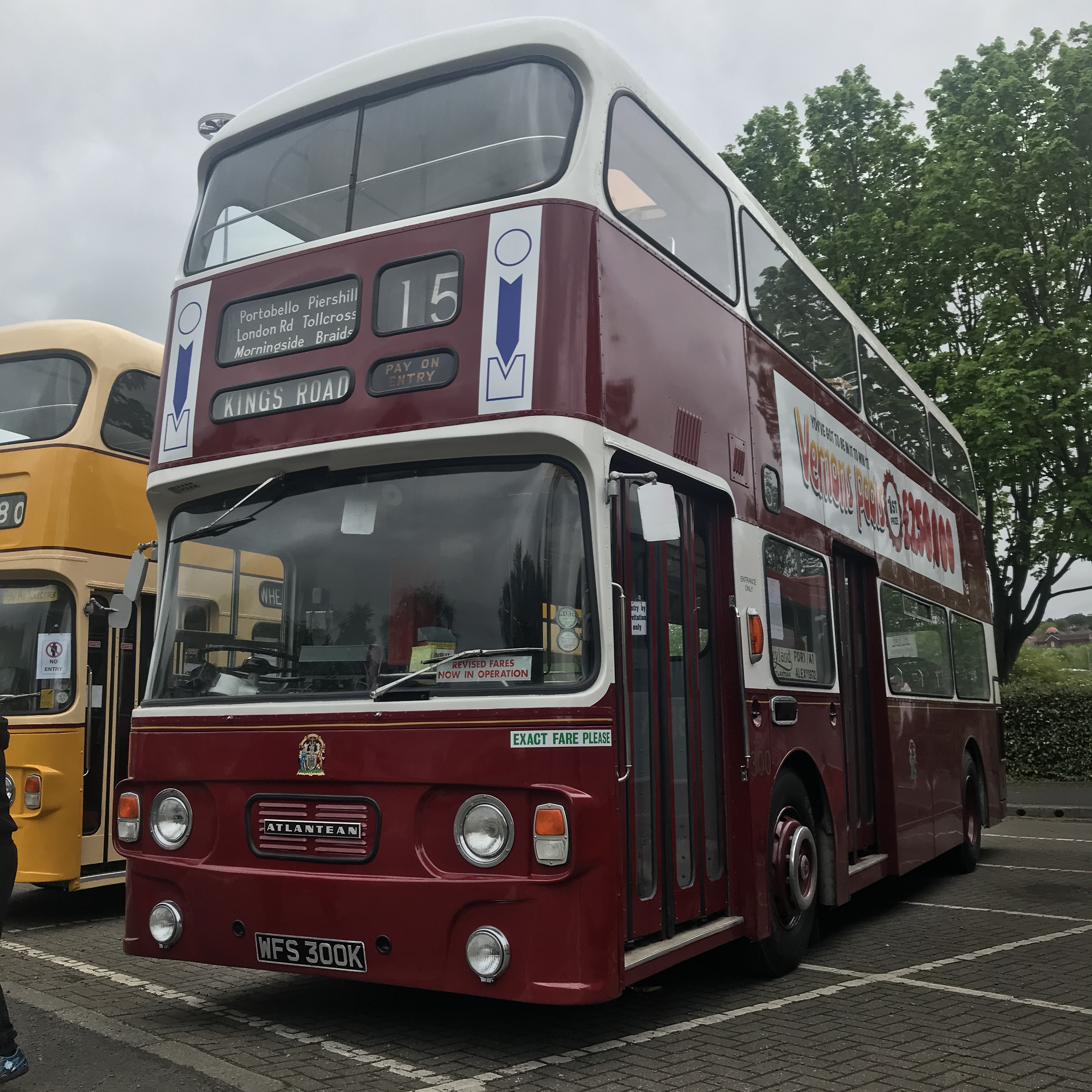
Preserved Alexander bodied Leyland Atlantean at the 2024 MetroCentre bus rally

In the period immediately following the Second World War, the Guy Arab and Daimler CV-series were favoured, with a smaller number of AEC Regent III. Between 1952 and 1966 some 452 Leyland Titan PD2 and PD3 were delivered (notably including 300 PD2s with MCCW Orion bodies in 1954–56 for tram replacement). With the move to rear-engined double-deckers, 588 Leyland Atlantean with Alexander bodies joined the fleet between 1965 and 1981.

With the demise of the Atlantean, the standard bus was the Leyland Olympian double decker with Eastern Coach Works or Alexander RH-type bodies (296 between 1982 and 1993). After the purchase of Leyland Bus by Volvo, Lothian remained loyal to the Volvo Olympian chassis, taking 134 with Alexander RH and Royale type bodies between 1994 and 1997. These were the last step-entrance buses purchased. 95 years of continuous Leyland operation with Lothian and its predecessors ended on 14 March 2009 with the withdrawal of the last Leyland Olympians.

Subsequently, low floor double-deckers have been specified. Initially, the Dennis Trident 2 was favoured, with 197 being purchased between 1999 and 2004, of which first five had Alexander ALX400 bodies and the remainder Plaxton President bodywork (including four built new as open-toppers). Six Volvo B7TL with Plaxton President bodies were purchased for comparison in 2000, along with a similar bus which had started life as a manufacturer's demonstrator. Subsequently, most new vehicles have been Volvos with Wrightbus bodywork, consisting of 225 Wright Eclipse Gemini bodied Volvo B7TL and B9TLs, 135 Wright Eclipse Gemini 2 bodied Volvo B9TLs, 40 Wright Gemini 3 bodied Volvo B5LH hybrid electric buses and 157 Wright Gemini 3 bodied Volvo B5TLs, including 30 built as open toppers.

In addition to the Volvos, a Scania OmniDekka demonstrator built to Lothian specification was delivered in 2004 for long-term evaluation, and although it was subsequently returned to the manufacturer it did lead to the purchase of 15 Scania OmniCitys between 2006 and 2007. Two of these were later converted to open toppers in 2018 for the East Coast Buses subsidiary. Another non-standard batch of buses are 15 Alexander Dennis Enviro400H hybrids delivered in 2011, although these have since been converted to full diesel operation and all withdrawn by 2023.

Secondhand Wrightbus bodied Volvo double deckers were purchased by Lothian between 2018 and 2019 to allow expansion of the Lothian Country operation, enable withdrawal of the last Tridents and Scanias, and accelerate replacement of early B7TLs with newer, lower-emission versions. These include four Wright Eclipse Gemini 2 bodied Volvo B5LHs from Bullocks Coaches, and 70 Wright Eclipse Gemini bodied Volvo B9TLs from various London operators.

The supplier of double deckers to the Lothian fleet reverted to Alexander Dennis in 2019, with the delivery of 78 Alexander Dennis Enviro400 XLB bodied Volvo B8L tri-axle double deckers. These have been continued with similar looking 98 Alexander Dennis Enviro400 MMC bodied Volvo B5TLs and four electric BYD Alexander Dennis Enviro400EVs, all delivered during 2021.

The current bodywork manufacturer is Egyptian company MCV Bus and Coach. The newest double deckers are 99 MCV bodied Volvo BZLs, delivered between 2023 to 2025.

=== Single deckers ===
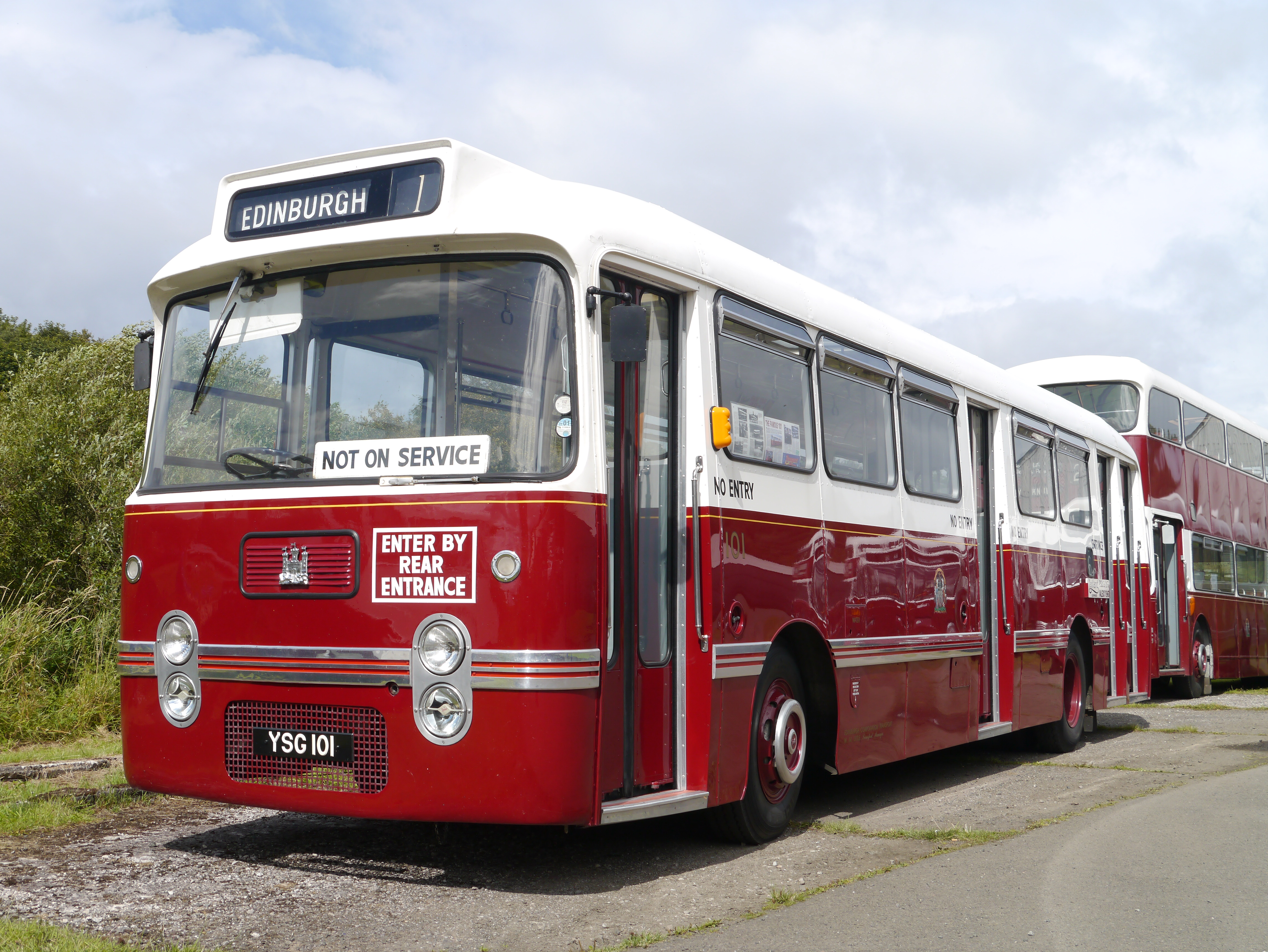
Preserved Alexander bodied Leyland Leopard with experimental three-door layout at the Scottish Vintage Bus Museum in August 2014

Post-war single-deckers comprised small batches of Guy Arab, Daimler CV-series, Crossley SD42, Bristol L-type, Leyland Royal Tiger and Olympic, and Albion Aberdonian. Between 1959 and 1960, some 100 Leyland Tiger Cubs with Weymann bodies were purchased to replace the assorted front engined single-deckers. In 1961 a solitary Leyland Leopard was delivered. This was number 101 (registered YSG101), which was notable as a very early example (in the UK) of a 36' long bus, for carrying the second ever example of Alexander's long-running Y-type body, and for being completed to an experimental standee layout with three sets of doors.

In 1966 the removal of disused railway bridges on Easter Road enabled the busy Leith circular services to be converted to double-deck operation. Many of the Tiger Cubs were sold to Ulsterbus, and the single-deck fleet declined markedly. No more large single-deckers were purchased until 1975, when twelve more Y-type Leopards (to a more conventional specification) were purchased, and ten 1974 Bedford YRTs with similar bodies to coach specification were downgraded to service buses after only one season. Twenty dual-door Leyland Nationals arrived between 1982 and 1985, followed by 12 dual-door Leyland Lynx in 1991. Later, some reconditioned secondhand Leyland Nationals were purchased for use on tendered services.

Since the move to low-floor buses the number of single deckers in the fleet has increased. After operating an Alexander Ultra bodied Volvo B10L demonstrator on long-term loan, 91 long-wheelbase Plaxton Pointer 2 bodied Dennis Dart SLFs were purchased between 2000 and 2003. Volvos were later adopted as standard, with 66 new Wright Eclipse Urban bodied Volvo B7RLEs delivered between 2004 and 2008, 24 Wright Eclipse Urban 2 bodied Volvo B7RLEs delivered between 2009 and 2013, and 50 Volvo 7900H hybrid electric buses delivered between 2013 and 2014.

The need for additional single deckers for the East Coast Buses subsidiary led to the purchase of another seven second-hand Wright Eclipse Urban bodied Volvo B7RLEs from Arriva Southern Counties in 2016, followed by the delivery of 15 new Wright Eclipse 3 bodied Volvo B8RLEs in 2017.

In 2019, Lothian trialled an MCV Evora-bodied Volvo B8RLE demonstrator on city centre service, which was followed by an order for 30 long-wheelbase B8RLE Evoras. These entered service at the start of 2021 and replaced Wright Eclipse-bodied Volvo B7RLEs based out of Longstone garage.

The newest single deckers are the Wright GB Kites. Lothian purchased 9 of them designated for route 36. These started operation on Monday 29 of June, 2026. These are also to help phase out the remaining Volvo 7900H.

=== Midibuses ===
Minibuses and short wheelbase midibuses have not been used in large numbers by Lothian, although some midibuses had previously been used on less busy routes. Ten Seddon Pennine IV-236 were acquired in 1973. These were replaced by 18 Leyland Cubs with Duple Dominant bodies in 1981, which in turn gave way to 12 9m Dennis Darts with Alexander Dash bodies in 1992. When the Darts were delivered they were the only non-Leyland vehicles in the fleet. In 2001 five of these Darts were sold to Yorkshire Traction. The ones that remained were gradually cascaded to the Mac Tours subsidiary until their replacement by six Optare Solo SRs in 2008. The Solos were in turn replaced by six Wright StreetAir EV DF electric buses in 2017.

=== Coaches ===
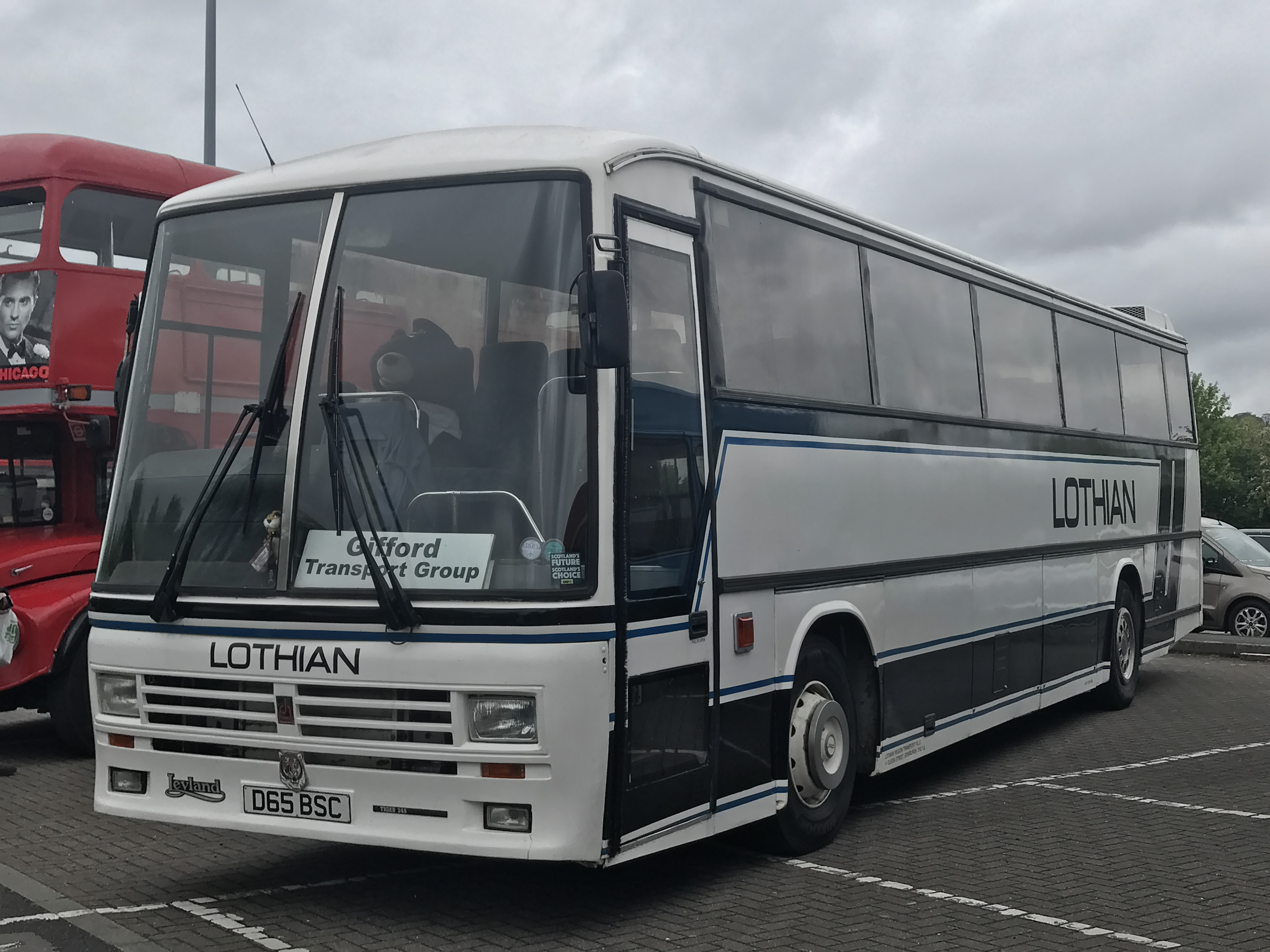
Preserved Duple bodied Leyland Tiger coach in black-and-white livery at the 2024 MetroCentre bus rally

Until the early 2000s, Lothian and its predecessors operated a small coach fleet. Until 1976 most coaches were lightweight types (mainly Bedfords), but subsequently 10 Leyland Leopard, 14 Leyland Tiger and 7 Dennis Javelin were purchased up to 1999. An oddity (in that it was an import in what was at the time a 100% British fleet) was a Toyota Coaster minicoach, new in 1993. The original coach operation was closed down in order to concentrate on stage services and the open top sightseeing tours.

In 2018, Lothian returned to the coach business with the launch of the Lothian Motorcoaches subsidiary, based at its own depot in Newbridge and commencing operations with five tri-axle Plaxton Panther bodied Volvo B11Rs and a pair of Mercedes-Benz Sprinter minicoaches. Six Plaxton Panther two-axle bodied Volvo B11Rs were also purchased in 2019. In addition, various secondhand Volvos were purchased to build up the fleet, including of one Plaxton Paragon bodied Volvo B12M, one Van Hool Acron T9 bodied Volvo B12B, four tri-axle Van Hool Acron T9 Volvo B12BTs, two similar Van Hool Acron T9 bodied B13RTs and six Caetano Levante bodied Volvo B9Rs. A fleet of Wright Eclipse Gemini bodied Volvo B9TL double-deckers were also cascaded from the main Lothian bus fleet.

Expansion of the Lothian Country operations into West Lothian in 2019 saw the purchase of eight new Plaxton Leopard bodied Volvo B8R interurban coaches for 'Green Arrow' express services between Bathgate, Linlithgow and Edinburgh, operated in conjunction with Scottish Citylink.

== Main fleet liveries & route branding ==
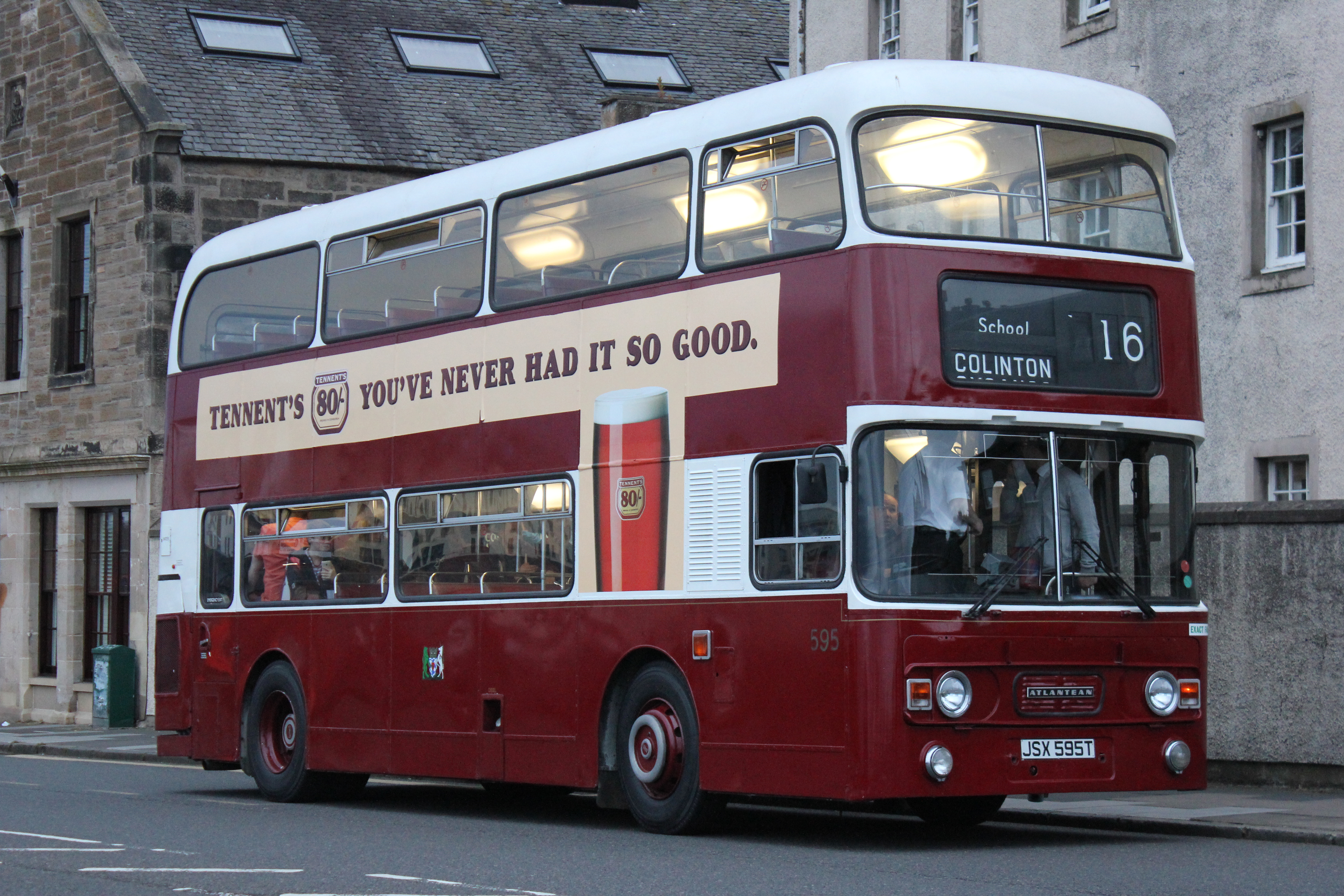
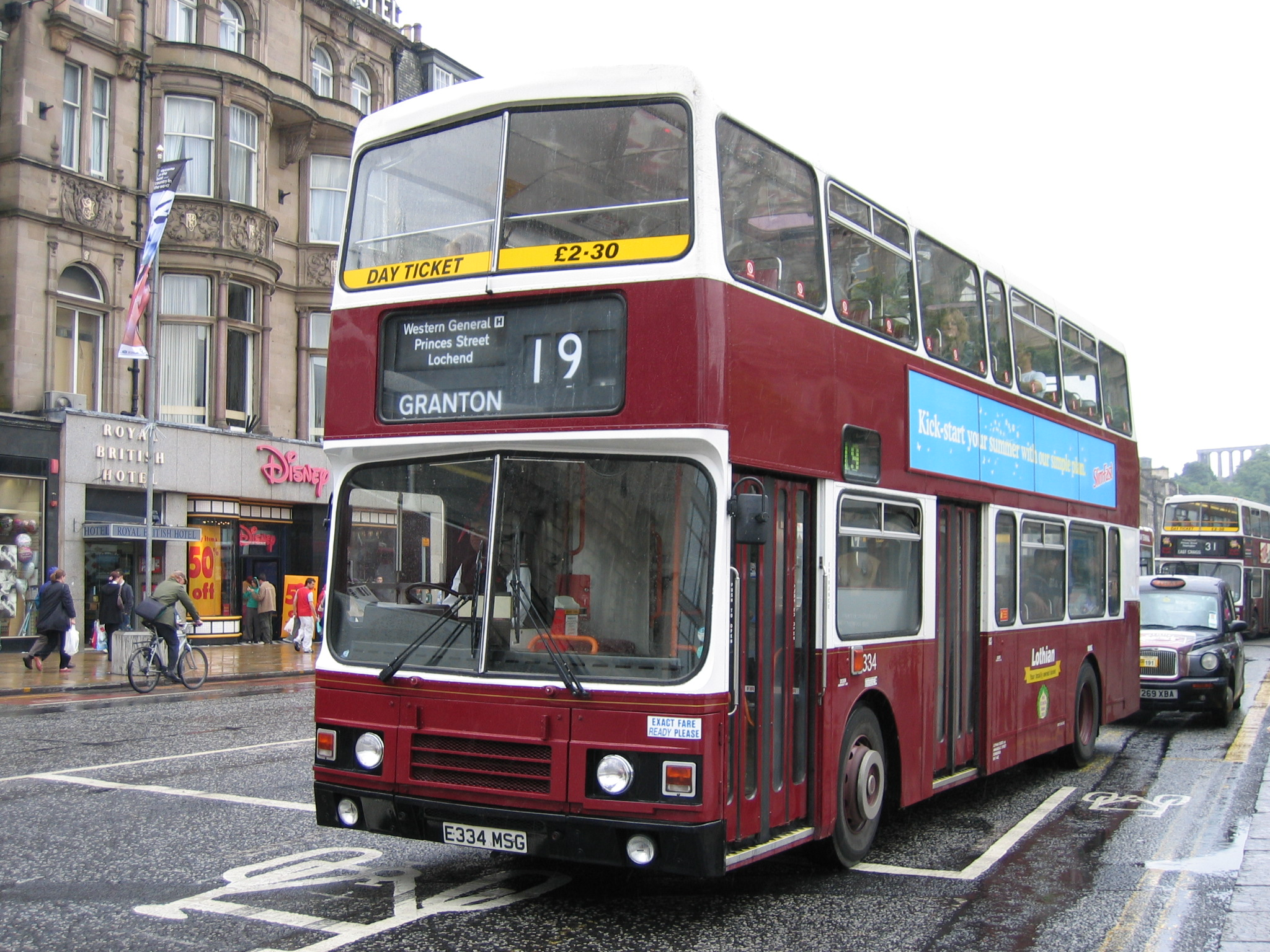
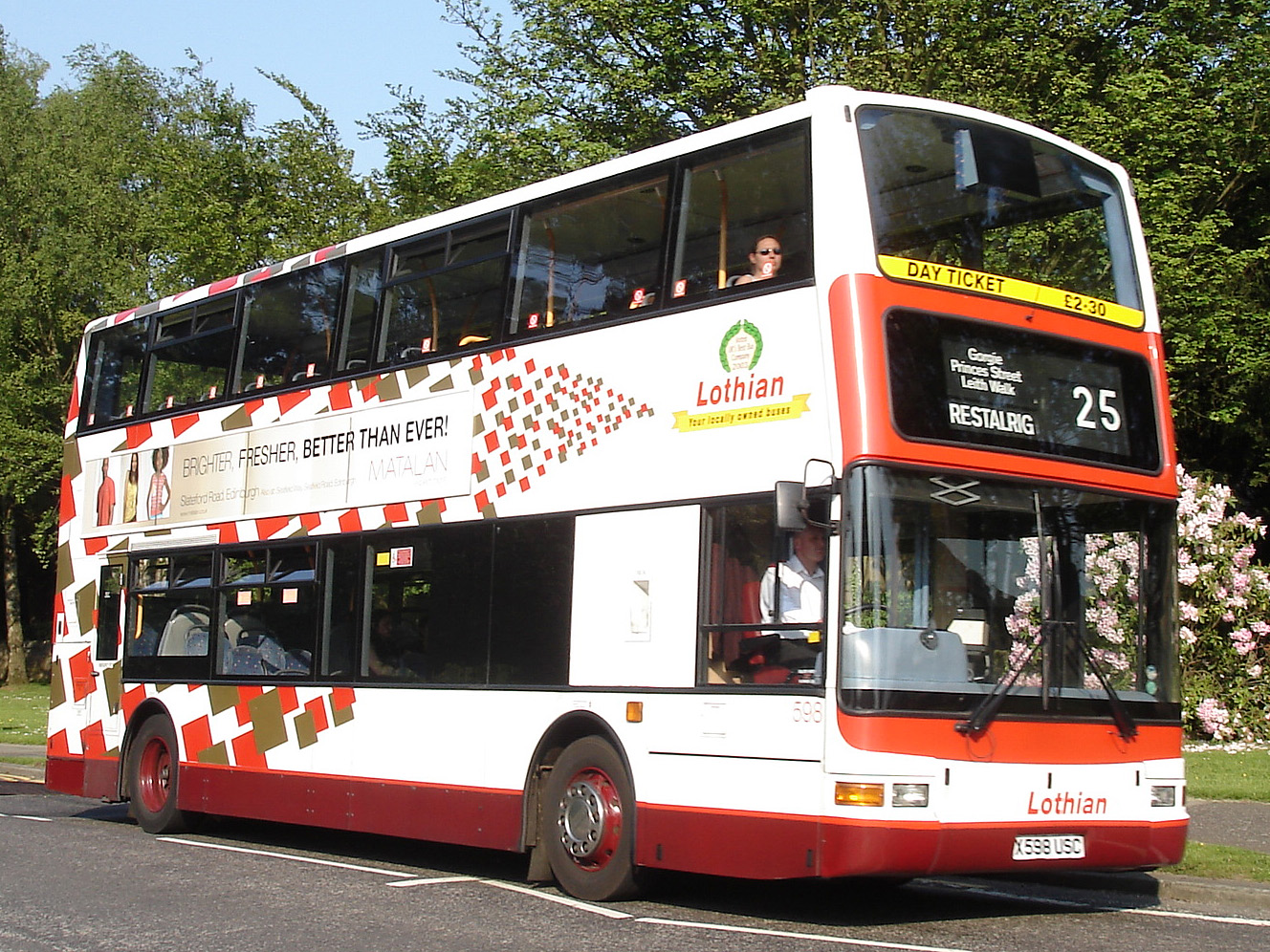
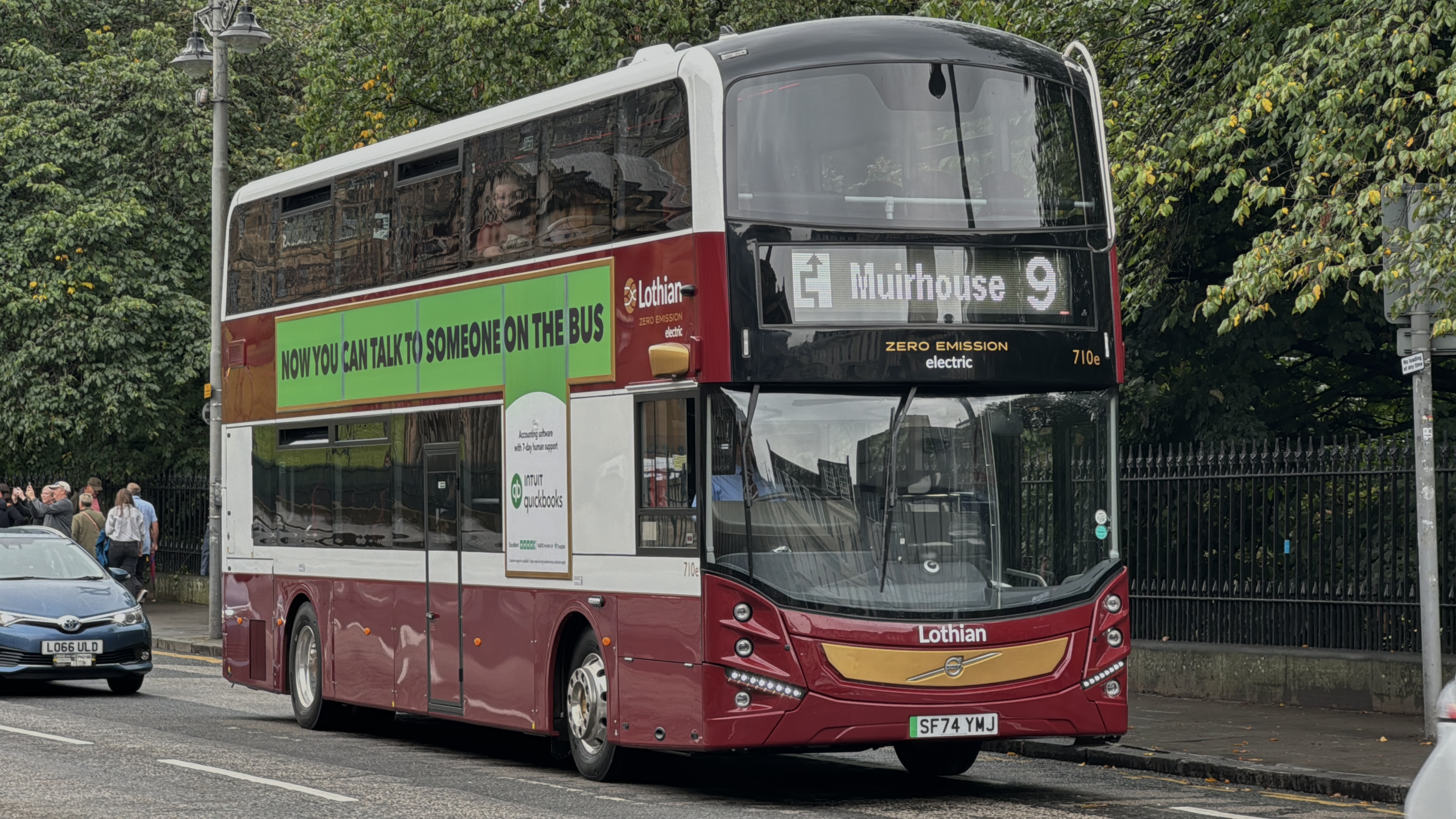
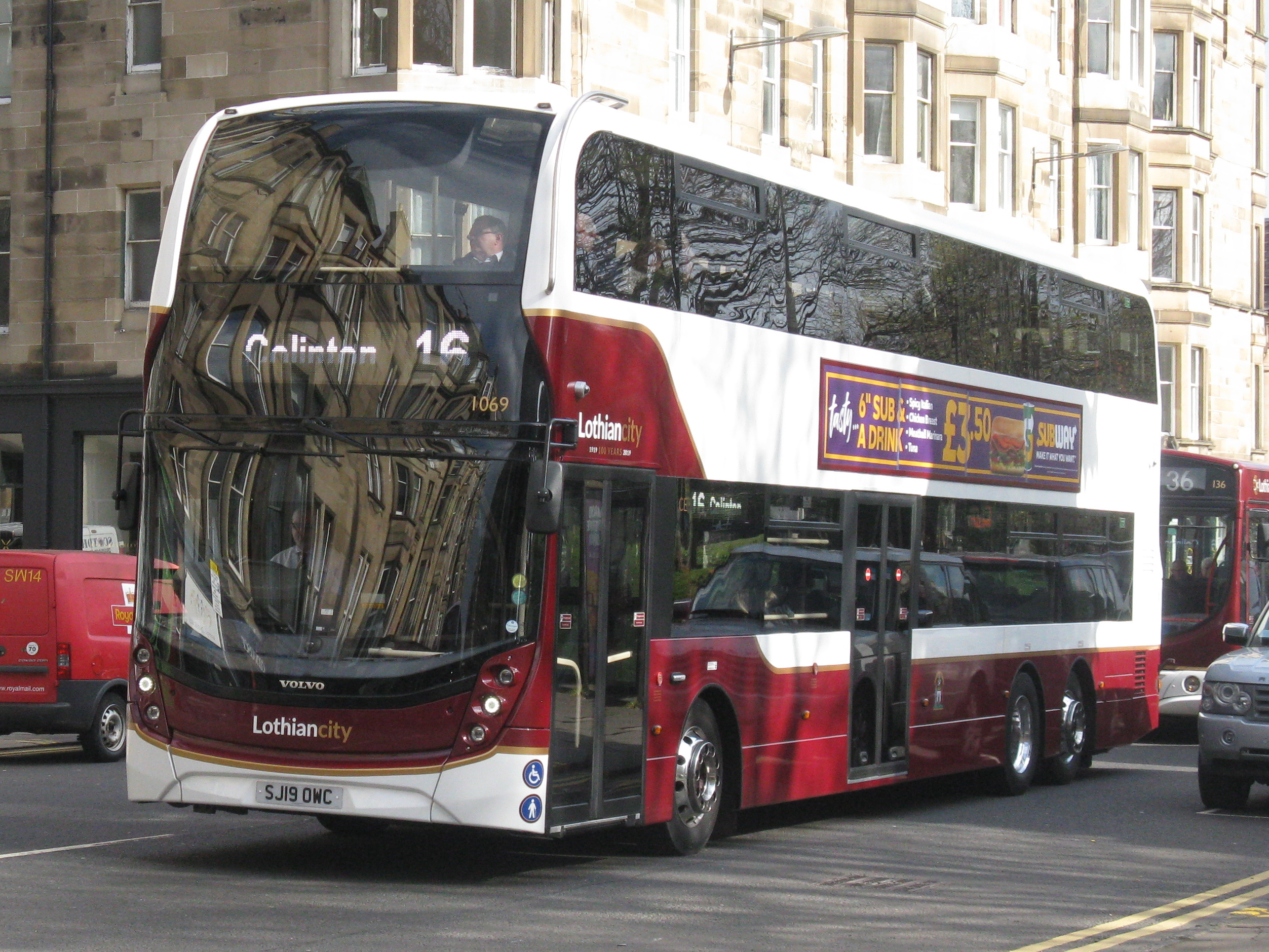
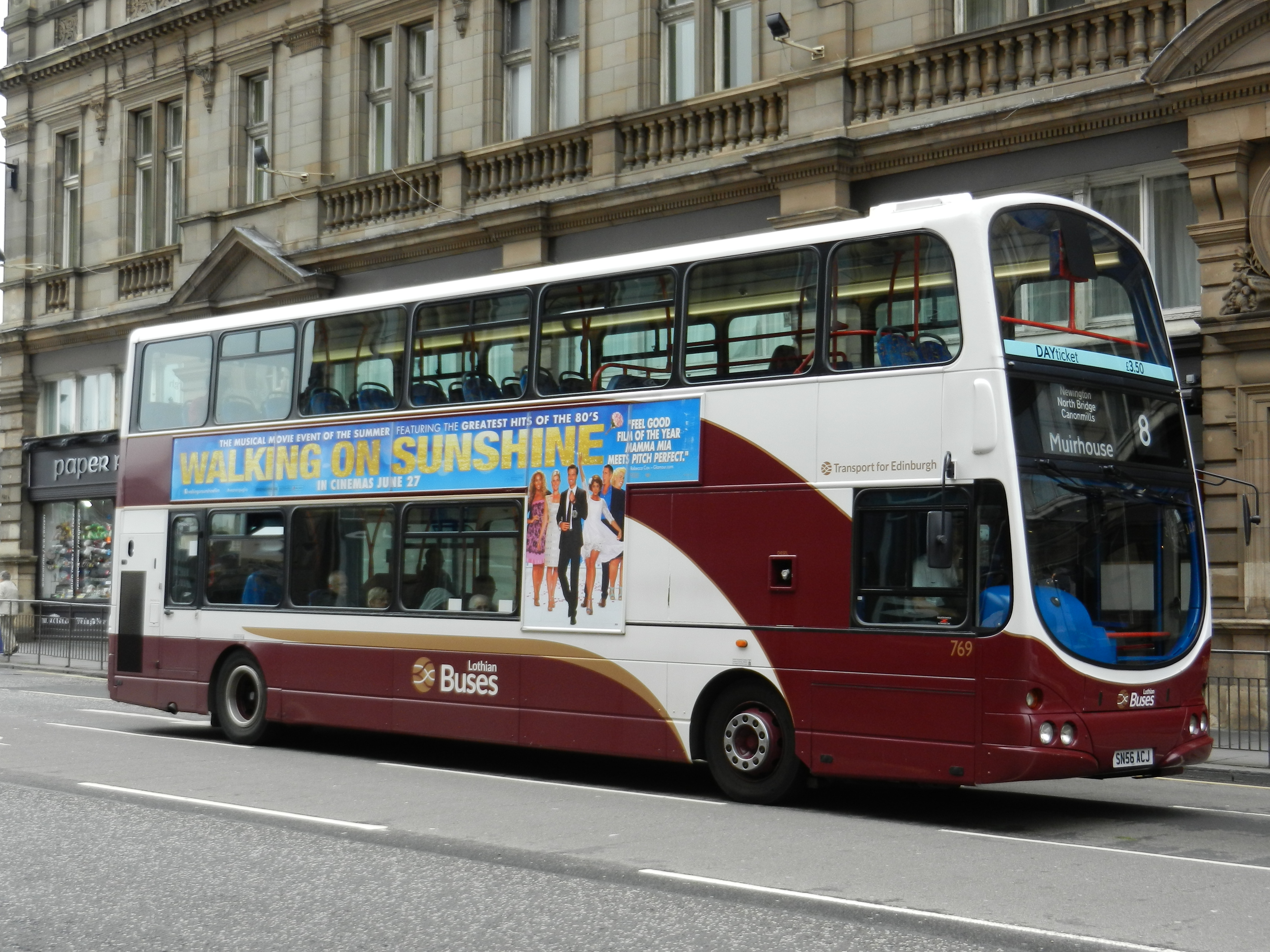
Clockwise from top left: some of the liveries worn on Lothian buses chronologically to present day

Traditionally, Edinburgh Corporation, Lothian Regional Transport and Lothian Buses had a livery of madder (a dark red) and cream (white), with matching madder leatherette seating.

In the 1920s the livery, as seen on the Hall bodied Karrier Type WL6/1 six-wheelers on delivery, was maroon, with a cream band under the windows, with white window surrounds and a black roof. The fleetname was 'Corporation Motors', applied on the cream band.

Some coach-seated Alexander RH bodied Leyland Olympians and Alexander Royale bodied Volvo Olympians had been painted in the same scheme, but with red in place of the madder. These vehicles are not branded for, but were typically found only on, routes 15/15A.

While Lothian had traditionally maintained a uniform livery for all buses, deliveries of low floor vehicles has seen a new standard livery introduced. Low floor vehicles have also seen route branding come to be increasingly used by Lothian. Route branding highlights the route of certain services making the buses easier to be spotted throughout Edinburgh and the Lothians.

In 1999–2000, a new "harlequin" livery was introduced for all new vehicle deliveries, consisting of all-over white, with madder lower skirting with a thin red separating stripe and a red front-panel. Gold and madder overlapping diamonds were added to the rear quarters and the rear of the vehicle. The red front serves to distinguish approaching Lothian vehicles from the all-over white of First Edinburgh. The livery was simplified in 2002 with the diamonds originating from a different position and no longer overlapping each other. This new livery was intended to highlight the low floor accessible nature of these buses and also benefitted from being more durable than the madder paint through the life of the bus. The harlequin livery was not retrospectively applied to older vehicles in the fleet, with the Alexander Royale bodied Olympians the last vehicles to be delivered in the traditional madder and white scheme and when these vehicles were withdrawn in 2009 this livery left the Lothian fleet also.

However, it was announced in March 2010 that the traditional madder and white livery was to be reintroduced across the 600-strong fleet. The vehicles were repainted as part of their ongoing maintenance, meaning Lothian buses in the former "harlequin" livery continued for a time to be a common sight on Edinburgh's streets; the last buses in the livery, these being six Plaxton President bodied Dennis Tridents, were either withdrawn or painted into madder and white by mid-2016.

Originally, twelve buses had been branded for route 35 but in November 2007 a similar number of buses, ten ex-Airlink and two from the 2004 delivery of Tridents, were branded for the 35. This featured a purple circle with the name "Airport-Holyrood-Government Link" and a route description on the sides above the purple circle. Certain single deckers were given extra branding promoting the Nightbus network.

From time to time, some buses will have wraparound advertising applied, either to the whole bus, an entire side or the entire rear of the bus. Ridacards were advertised on the entire side of older Olympians.

Previously, services 22 and 30 were branded but with the 22 converted to double-deck operation on 18 January 2009, this service lost the branding. The 30 also lost its branding, as the Dennis Darts used on it were replaced by cascaded Volvo B7RLEs from the 22 service.

Beginning in 2016 with the arrival of open-top Wright StreetDecks for the Edinburgh tour bus routes, it was clear that Lothian was using one new style of livery for all different operators and services. For example, standard Lothian buses had a white main body with a dark red stripe, and gold used as lining. East Coast buses had a grey main body, with a green stripe and white lining. For a period this was how all different services were painted, but when Alexander Dennis Enviro400 XLBs were introduced for Airlink routes they took on their own uniquely designed livery.

When the Volvo BZLs arrived, they took their own madder and white livery. It looked more traditional than the previous two liveries, as the boxy shape loosely resembles one of Lothian Regional Transports old Leyland Atlantean.

== Finances ==
The first route (1919) initially generated an average revenue of £35 a day. This had risen to £150 on this one route by 1921, thanks to increasing the frequency and length. This particular route could even reach £260 on Saturdays due to football crowds, passing as it did the grounds of the city's two top clubs, Hearts and Hibs.

Working on a financial year ending in May, the corporation bus fleet recorded net profits from 1921 to 1923, with a high of over £21.1k in 1922 being followed by a low of £8.5k in 1923.

One factor affecting Edinburgh's finances is the above-average fuel consumption of the fleet, which is due to the hilly terrain.

Having nearly reached 20m in 1923/4, the number of bus passengers carried in 1924/5 dropped back to 15.5m after The Mound and Hanover Street route was converted from bus operation to electric trams. By May 1925, the Corporation had 88 buses in regular use. Despite the size, and after a total capital expenditure of nearly £200,000 on buses and garages (of which around three-quarters had already been paid off), they now returned an annual loss of £8,174 on revenues of £109,400, although the loss included the cost of converting half the fleet to pneumatic tyres (without which, the loss would have been £1,357).

By 1926 passenger numbers had increased to 17.2m, bringing the bus fleet back into profit, albeit just £1,933.

A challenge presented itself in 1935 with the combination of rising fuel price rises and oil duty increases meaning the Corporation would add an extra £9,500 a year in costs.
