= List of Lothian Buses preserved vehicles =

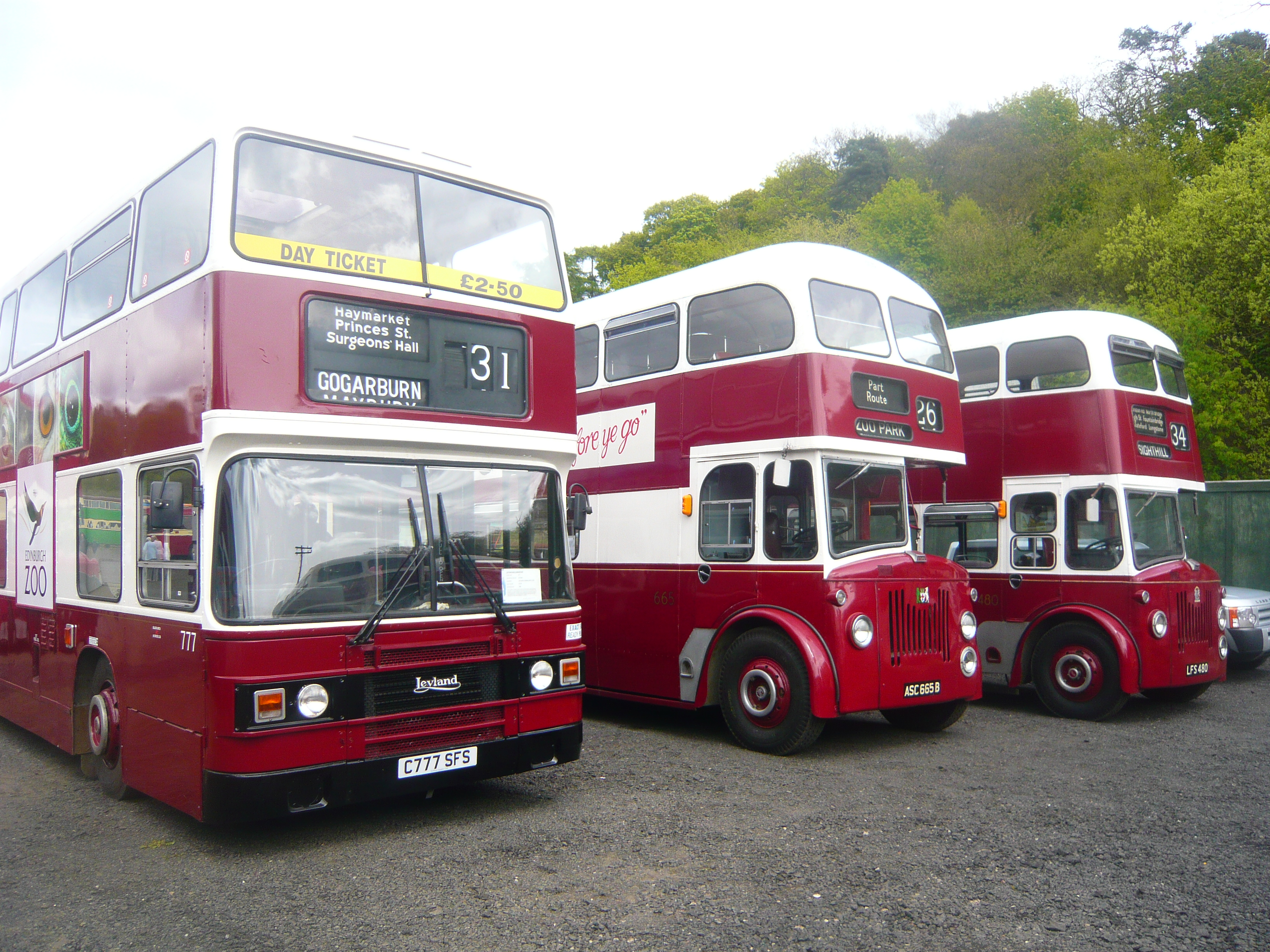
Former Lothian Buses 121, a preserved Bedford YRT with Alexander AY bodywork

Lothian Buses Ltd are a major bus company operating in Edinburgh.

A number of the vehicles used by Lothian Buses and its predecessors Edinburgh Corporation Transport and Lothian Regional Transport have been preserved. Several of them appear at rallies and events with some travelling around the country. The following is a list of the vehicles now preserved:

Date	Type	Body	Chassis	Registration	Fleet number	Livery	Ref.	Photo
1948	Single Decker	Metro-Cammell	Guy Arab MkIII 5LW	ESG 652	739	Madder & White		
1948	Parcel Van	Van	Albion AZ9	GFS 329	unknown			
1948	Recovery Vehicle	n/a	ERF 6LW	FWS 853	6			
1949	Double Decker	Metro-Cammell	Daimler CVG6	FSC 182	135	Madder & White		
1953	Double Decker	Duple/Nudd	Guy Arab 5LW	JWS 594	314	Madder & White		
1954	Double Decker	Metro-Cammell Weymann Orion	Leyland Titan PD2/20	LFS 480	480	Madder & White		
1956	Double Decker	Metro-Cammell Weymann Orion	Leyland Titan PD2/20	NSF 757	757			
1957	Double Decker	Metro-Cammell Weymann Orion	Leyland Titan PD2/20	OFS 777	777	Madder & White		
1956	Double Decker	Metro-Cammell Weymann Orion	Leyland Titan PD2/20	OFS 798	798	Madder & White		
1960	Single Decker	Metro-Cammell Weymann	Leyland Tiger Cub PSUC1/3	VSC 86	86	Madder & White		
1961	Single Decker	Alexander Y Type	Leyland Leopard PSU3/2R	YSG 101	101	Madder & White		
1962	Double Decker	Alexander	Leyland Titan PD2A/30	YWS 611	611	Madder & White		
1964	Double Decker	Alexander E	Leyland Titan PD3/6	ASC 665B	665	Madder & White		
1964	Double Decker	Alexander E	Leyland Titan PD3/6	ASC 690B	690	Madder & White		
1965	Double Decker	Alexander A	Leyland Atlantean PDR1/1	ESF 801C	801	Madder & White		
1966	Double Decker	Alexander A	Leyland Atlantean PDR1/1	EWS 812D	812	Madder & White		
1966	Double Decker	Alexander E	Leyland Titan PD3A/2	EWS 833D	833	Madder & White		
1967	Double Decker	Alexander A	Leyland Atlantean PDR1/1	JSC 869E	869	White & Black		
1967	Open Top Double Decker	Alexander J	[Leyland Atlantean] PDR2/1	JSC 900E	900	Madder & White		
1970	Coach	Duple Viceroy	Bedford VAL70	SSF 237H	237	White & Madder		
1972	Double Decker	Alexander AL	Leyland Atlantean AN68/1R	BFS 1L	1	Madder & White		
1973	Midibus	Seddon	Seddon Pennine Mk IV/236	BWS 105L	105	White & Madder		
1973	Recovery Vehicle	n/a	Bedford TK Tower Wagon	USX 604L	unknown	Madder & White		
1974	Single Decker	Alexander AY	Bedford YRT	GSX 121N	121	White & Madder		
1975	Single Decker	Alexander AY	Leyland Leopard PSU3C/4R	MSF 122P	122	White & Madder		
1977	Towing Vehicle	Alexander AYS	Leyland Leopard PSU3C/3R	WSU 454S	BD3	Madder		
1978	Coach	Alexander AT	Leyland Leopard PSU3E/4R	EFS 228S	228	Scarlet Band		
1978	Coach	Alexander AT	Leyland Leopard PSU3E/4R	EFS 229S	229	White & Black		
1978	Coach	Alexander AT	Leyland Leopard PSU3E/4R	EFS 230S	230	White & Black		
1979	Double Decker	Alexander AL	Leyland Atlantean AN68A/1R	JSX 595T	595	Madder & White		
1981	Midibus	Duple Dominant	Leyland Cub CU435	HSC 173X	173	White & Madder		
1982	Double Decker	Alexander AL	Leyland Atlantean AN68C/1R	GSC 621X	621	Griersons of Fishburn		
1982	Double Decker	Alexander AL	Leyland Atlantean AN68C/1R	GSC 659X	659	Madder & White		
1982	Double Decker	Alexander RH	Leyland Olympian ONTL11/1R	GSC 667X	667	Madder & White		
1982	Single Decker	Integral	Leyland National 2 NL116L11	KSX 102X	102	Madder & White		
1983	Single Decker	Integral	Leyland National 2 NL116TL11/2R	A108 CFS	108	White & Madder		
1985	Double Decker	Eastern Coach Works	Leyland Olympian ONTL11/2R	C777 SFS	777	Madder & White		
1986	Coach	Duple 320	Leyland Tiger TRCTL11/3RH	D65 BSC	65	White & Black		
1988	Double Decker	Alexander R	Leyland Olympian ONCL10/2RZ	E321 MSG	321	Madder & White		
1988	Double Decker	Alexander R	Leyland Olympian ONCL10/2RZ	E322 MSG	322	Madder & White		
1991	Single Decker	Alexander Dash	Dennis Dart	K117 CSG	117	Madder & White		
1995	Double Decker	Alexander R-type	Volvo Olympian YN2RC16Z4	M210 VSX	210	Madder & White		
1997	Double Decker	Alexander Royale	Volvo Olympian OLY-56	P285 PSX	285	Madder & White		
2000	Double Decker	Plaxton President	Dennis Trident 2	W572 RSG	572	Harlequin		
2001	Double Decker	Plaxton President	Dennis Trident 2	SN51 AYB	618	Swoops		
2002	Single Decker	Plaxton Pointer	Dennis Dart SLF	SK52 OJE	61	SVBM ex Harlequin		
2004	Double Decker	Plaxton President	Dennis Trident 2	SN04 AAJ	664	Airlink		
2004	Single Decker	Wright Eclipse Urban	Volvo B7RLE	SN04 NHC	112	Harlequin		

== See also ==
- Lothian Buses
- History of Lothian Buses
- Bus preservation in the United Kingdom
- Scottish Vintage Bus Museum
- Transport for Edinburgh
- Transport in Scotland
