= Edinburgh Corporation Tramways =

Tram network in Edinburgh, Scotland

Operation
- Locale: Edinburgh
- Open: 1 July 1919
- Close: 16 November 1956
- Status: Closed

Infrastructure
- Track gauge: 1,435 mm (4 ft 8 1/2 in)
- Propulsion system: Electric
- Depots: Henderson Row, Tollcross, Westfield, Shrubhill, Leith Walk, Portobello, Musselburgh

Statistics
- Route length: 47.25 miles (76.04 km)

Edinburgh Corporation Tramways was a Scottish tram network that formerly served the City of Edinburgh, Scotland. The city used four-wheeled double-decked trams painted dark red (madder) and white – a livery still used by Lothian Buses and the modern light rail Edinburgh Trams.

== Origins ==
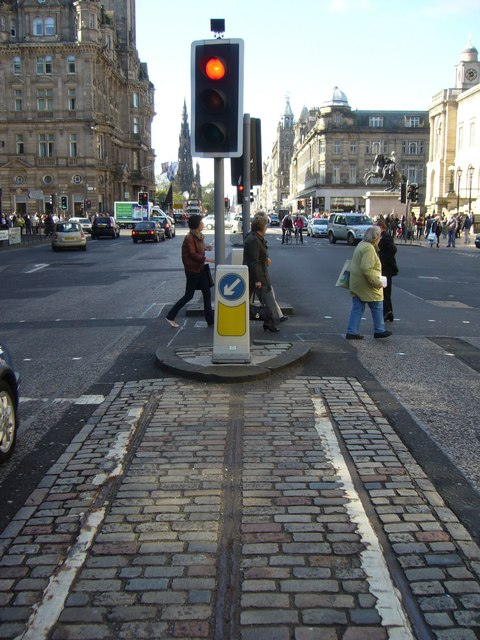
Remnant of the old cable-hauled tramway remain on Waterloo Place at the East End of Princes Street

The first trams in Edinburgh were horse-drawn and operated by the Edinburgh Street Tramways Company. This replaced an earlier horse-drawn coach system. The inaugural service (Haymarket to Bernard Street) ran on 6 November 1871. The tracks were laid by Sir James Gowans with John Macrae as engineer. These lines complemented and partly replaced the pre-existing horse-drawn carriage from Edinburgh to Leith, the only essential difference being the addition of guide rails. In January 1888, the Edinburgh Northern Tramways started the first cable-hauled trams. This had its depot and drive-mechanism on Henderson Row, a building partially preserved in the Royal London (formerly Scottish Life Assurance) offices there. Part of the winding gear is preserved on the pavement to the east side of the office. In 1894, the Edinburgh Street Tramway lines in Edinburgh (but not Leith or Portobello) were taken over by the Edinburgh and District Tramways Company. On 1 July 1919, Edinburgh Corporation took over the operation of the city's tramways. The system remained under the overall control of R. S. Pilcher, who had joined the company in 1918 having previously run Aberdeen Corporation Tramways.

Leith Corporation took over the still horse-drawn Leith tramlines in 1904 and introduced electric traction in 1905 (the first electric system in Scotland). Edinburgh Corporation took over the Leith system in 1920 (see below).

== Electrification ==
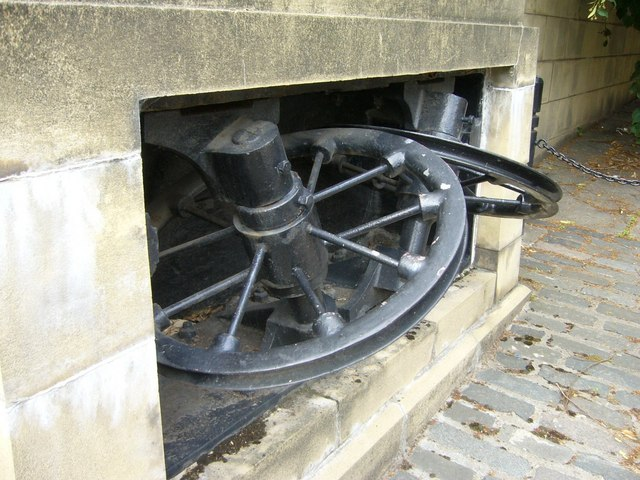
Tram cable pulley unit at the Henderson Row depot in Stockbridge (now an insurance company office)

Until 1920, Leith was a separate burgh, with its own municipal tram system. The Leith system was electrified, whereas the Edinburgh system used cable haulage (as still used by the San Francisco cable car system and the Great Orme Tramway in Wales). The cable was housed in a shallow trough between the tram rails; breakages could reduce the entire system to a halt. The main depot was moved to Shrubhill on Leith Walk. An underground chamber at the main turn into the garages here was permanently staffed during operating hours to try to reduce cable-snagging.

Passengers going from Edinburgh to Leith had to change trams (from cable-drawn to electric) at Pilrig on Leith Walk at the boundary between Leith and Edinburgh. This confused exchange of passengers was known locally as "the Pilrig muddle", and lasted until the electrification of the Edinburgh system.

In 1922, Edinburgh Corporation decided to convert the entire system to electric traction. This took around three years to implement, with the last cable tram used in June 1923. A short section of original tram rail and cable track can still be seen in Waterloo Place.

Musselburgh also had its own electrified tram system from 1906. Passengers had to change to the cable-hauled Edinburgh trams at Joppa until 1923. The Musselburgh system was subsequently incorporated into the Edinburgh system, with the tramway to Port Seton closing east of Levenhall in 1928. Musselburgh continued to be served by Edinburgh trams until 1954.

== Extensions ==
The system continued to expand during the 1930s. New routes included Gorgie to Stenhouse (1930), Braids to Fairmilehead (1936) and North Gyle to Maybury (1937). Further extensions were curtailed due to the outbreak of World War II.

== Closure ==
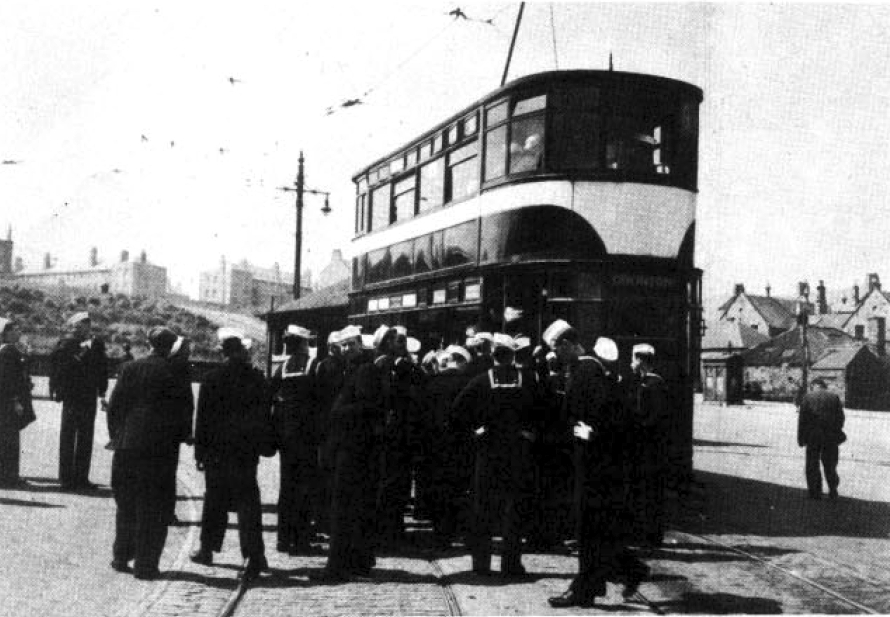
An Edinburgh Standard tram in 1947

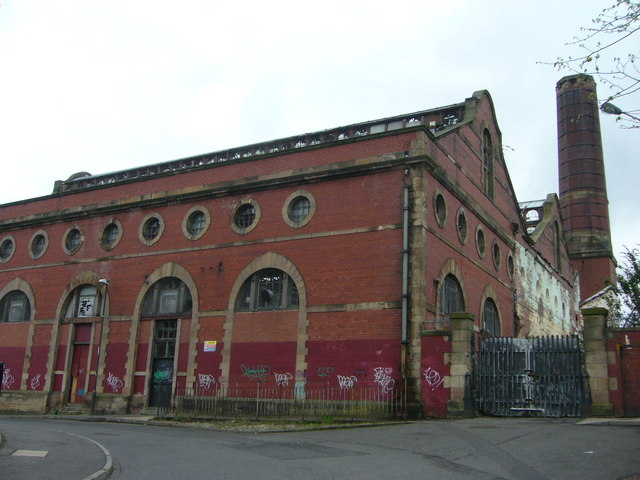
The Shrubhill Depot, Leith Walk

Edinburgh Corporation introduced its first motor bus in 1914. In 1928, given the increasing importance of buses, the Edinburgh Corporation Tramways Department was renamed the Edinburgh Corporation Transport Department.

Following World War II, all municipal tramways in the United Kingdom (with the sole exception of the Blackpool tramway) were progressively closed and replaced by diesel buses.

Initially, Edinburgh Corporation took advantage of the closure of other systems by buying modern secondhand trams from Manchester Corporation. Nevertheless, a programme of replacement of trams by buses was introduced in the early 1950s. Edinburgh's last tram operated on 16 November 1956, terminating at the Shrubhill Depot on Leith Walk (archive film footage exists of the event).

One tramcar has been preserved – number 35, built in 1948 – which was put on display in a small museum at the Shrubhill Depot for a number of years. The museum eventually closed in the 1980s due to a leaking roof. Tram number 35 operated briefly at the Glasgow Garden Festival in 1988 and on the Blackpool tramway, before going into retirement at the National Tramway Museum in Derbyshire where it remains on display today.

Various reasons were given for replacing the trams including the problem of a fixed-rail system with largely street-running which meant that a single accident could bring much of the system to a halt. In reality, the policy was largely due to a change of local political power in the city in 1950 and to the appointment of William Morrison Little as General Manager in 1950. William Morrison Little thought that buses would serve the city better than trams. The increased popularity of the motor car in post-war Britain created an environment in which trams were seen generally as archaic and as an obstruction to other traffic.

When buses replaced trams they followed the same routes previously taken by the trams and used the same route numbers. This led to some anomalies which still existed in 2010, such as the absence of buses on the Pleasance—a major city artery—which was too steep at its northern end for trams. Lothian Buses only started to serve the Pleasance in 2014 (route 60).

== Managers ==
The first Edinburgh Corporation Tram Manager was R. Stuart Pilcher who was appointed at the early age of 24 in 1919 having previously worked in Aberdeen. He left his post in 1929 to become Tram Manager in Manchester, England. He subsequently became Chairman of the Traffic Commissioners in the West Midlands of England. In 1921 he was responsible for establishing a trade organisation which eventually became part of the Scottish Council of the Confederation of Passenger Transport (CPT).

Pilcher managed the electrification of Edinburgh's trams in 1922/3. At the luncheon held on 15 January 1929 to mark his departure from Edinburgh and in response to Lord Provost Sir Alexander Stevenson's remarks, he said that "they deliberately planned the changeover so as not to affect public opinion. They were nervous of the effect of the hoardings and a half-finished job."

He was followed by FA Fitzpayne MIEE, who remained in post until 1934 when, Robert McLeod M Inst T took over. He in turn was succeeded by William Morrison Little in 1949.

== Tramcars ==
=== Inherited fleet ===
Edinburgh Corporation inherited 38 electric trams from the Leith system, and almost 200 Edinburgh cable car bodies were converted to electric propulsion in the period 1921–24. There was initially some experimentation with bogie trucks (including attempts to electrify the original cable car chassis) but it was quickly decided to standardise on new 4-wheel trucks. Most of these early cars had originally been open top, but most were modernised with top covers and the later survivors also received vestibule screens and enclosed balconies. The last open top car was scrapped in 1934 and the final ex-Leith cars were withdrawn in 1936, but some of the converted cable cars remained in service until 1947. The body of car 226 (a former cable car dating from 1903 and withdrawn in 1938) was secured for preservation in 1987 after being used as a holiday chalet, and is undergoing restoration.

The Musselburgh company's trams were not included in the acquisition of that system.

=== Standard cars ===
Between 1922 and 1934, 240 Edinburgh Standard cars were built by the Corporation's Shrubhill Works and four private builders (McHardy & Elliot, Leeds Forge, English Electric and Pickering). Like all subsequent Edinburgh trams these were 4-wheelers. All featured timber 4-bay bodies, initially with open balconies on the upper decks, but cars built from 1930 had enclosed balconies and these were subsequently added to the earlier Standard cars as well. They were withdrawn between 1949 and 1956.

=== Experimental cars ===
Two cars were built at Shrubhill in 1932 and 1933 as a prelude to the development of a new generation of trams. Car 180 featured composite construction (steel frames but wood and aluminium panelling, unlike the predominantly timber Standard cars) and had a 5-bay body with flat sides and curved corner glazing which gave it a much more modern appearance than the Standard cars. It was delivered in a special red and grey livery which earned it the nickname "Red Biddy". Car 261 was a less radical development, being essentially a Standard car with flat lower deck sides. It was withdrawn in 1955, but car 180 survived until the final closure of the Edinburgh tram system on 16 November 1956.

=== All-steel cars ===
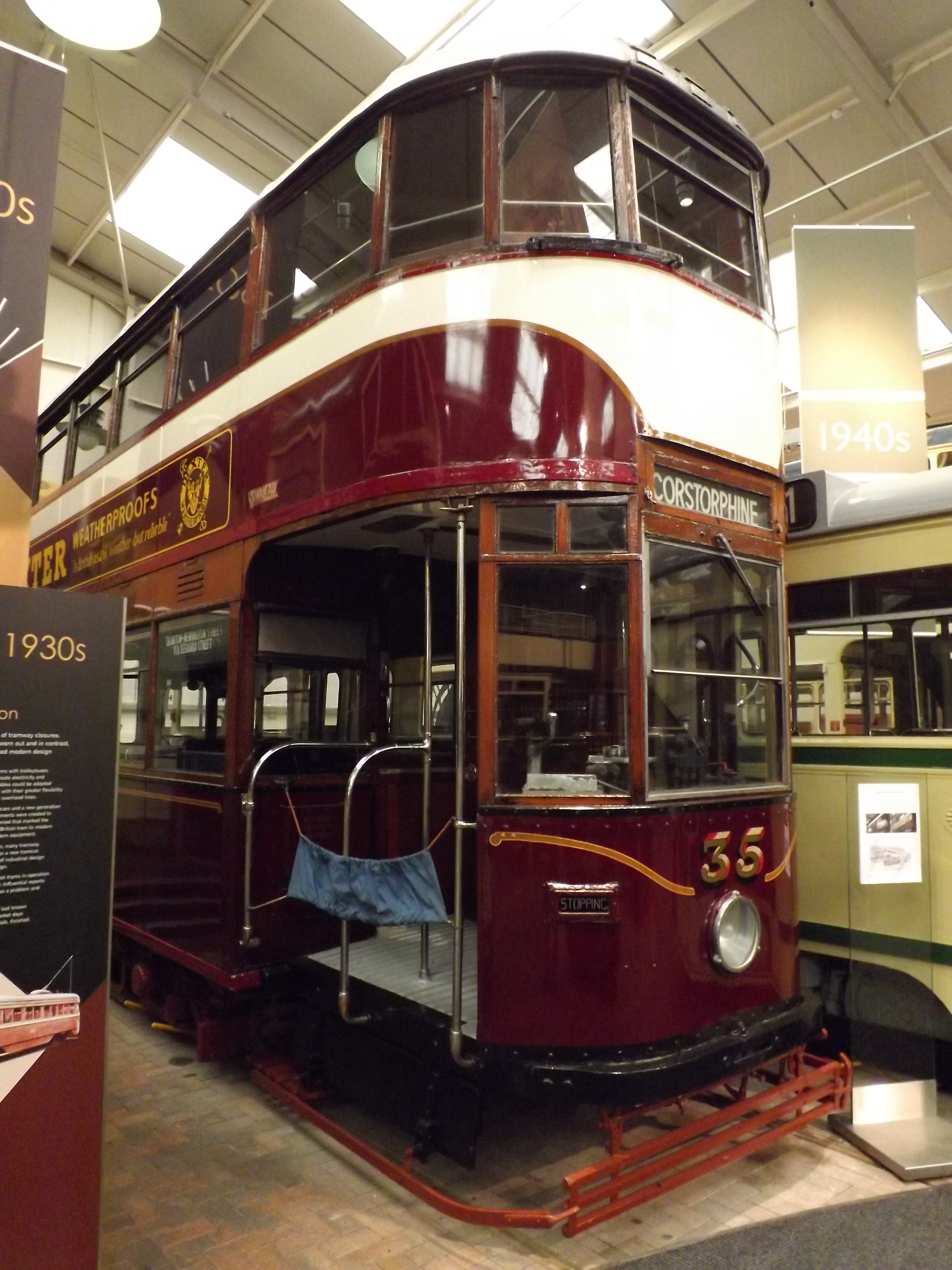
Preserved Edinburgh car 35 at Crich

The next new trams were various all-steel cars purchased from private builders. There were three broad types:

- 2 cars from Metro-Cammell in 1933 (nos. 260 and 265), resembling the Red Biddy but without the curved glazing
- 9 cars from Metro-Cammell and Hurst Nelson in 1934, similar but with domed roofs (the first Edinburgh cars with this feature)
- 23 cars from English Electric, Metro-Cammell and Hurst Nelson in 1934–35, with raked-back "streamlined" ends and domed roofs

Five of the 1934 Metro-Cammell batch were withdrawn relatively early in 1951–52, but all the others ran until 1955–56.

=== New Standard composite cars ===
The last new trams built for Edinburgh Corporation were 84 cars built at Shrubhill between 1935 and 1950. These were of five-bay composite construction, being a development of the Red Biddy but with flat corner glass, domed roofs and various other refinements. The whole class survived until 1956, with 35 of them in service until the final closure of the system. Of these, car 35 (built in 1948) was selected by the City for preservation. It is now at the National Tramway Museum in Crich, Derbyshire.

=== Ex-Manchester "Pilcher" cars ===
11 former Manchester Corporation cars were purchased in 1947–49. These were longer than the indigenous cars and were therefore confined to the relatively straight route from Waterloo Place to Levenhall. Although relatively modern cars dating from 1930 to 1932, they were in very poor condition when they arrived in Edinburgh and required extensive refurbishment before entering service. All were withdrawn in 1954.

== New line ==
A new light rail tramline from Edinburgh Airport to York Place (in the city centre) opened on Saturday 31 May 2014.

The line was later extended to Leith and Newhaven, opening to passengers on 7 June 2023.

Further extensions to the network are currently under consideration.

== See also ==
- National Tramway Museum
- Scottish Tramway and Transport Society
- Leith Corporation Tramways
