= Stirling and Bridge of Allan Tramways =

Tramway

Stirling and Bridge of Allan Tramway

Operation
- Locale: Stirling, Bridge of Allan
- Open: 27 July 1874
- Close: 20 May 1920
- Status: Closed

Infrastructure
- Track gauge: 1,435 mm (4 ft 8 1/2 in)
- Propulsion systems: Horse and Petrol

Statistics
- Route length: 4.35 miles (7.00 km)

The Stirling and Bridge of Allan Tramway was a tramway between Stirling and Bridge of Allan from 1874 to 1920.

== History ==
The company obtained the Stirling and Bridge of Allan Tramways Order 1872, ratified by the Tramways Orders Confirmation (No. 4) Act 1872 (35 & 36 Vict. c. clviii). The order gave approval to construct the tramway in 1872. Construction in May 1874 and the line was ready for opening by 27 July. Tramcars were obtained from the Tramway Car and Works Company of Glasgow.

An extension was opened on 29 January 1898 to St. Ninians which added just over a mile of route to the tramway.

The horse drawn tramcars were supplemented by a secondhand vehicle obtained from the Edinburgh and District Tramways in 1902. This was modernised in 1913 when a petrol engine was inserted.

== Closure ==
Services ended on 20 May 1920.

== Bibliography ==
- Public Bills:Tramways Provisional Orders Confirmation (No. 4) Stirling and Bridge of Allan Tramways. Vol. 6. House of Commons : 35 Vict. 1872.
- Public Bills:Tramways Orders Confirmation (No. 2) Stirling and Bridge of Allan Extension. Vol. 8. House of Lords : 60 Vict. 1897.
- Klapper, Charles F. (1974). The golden age of tramways. Newton Abbot: David & Charles. OCLC 1149242721.
