= Edinburgh and District Tramways =

Former tram system in Scotland

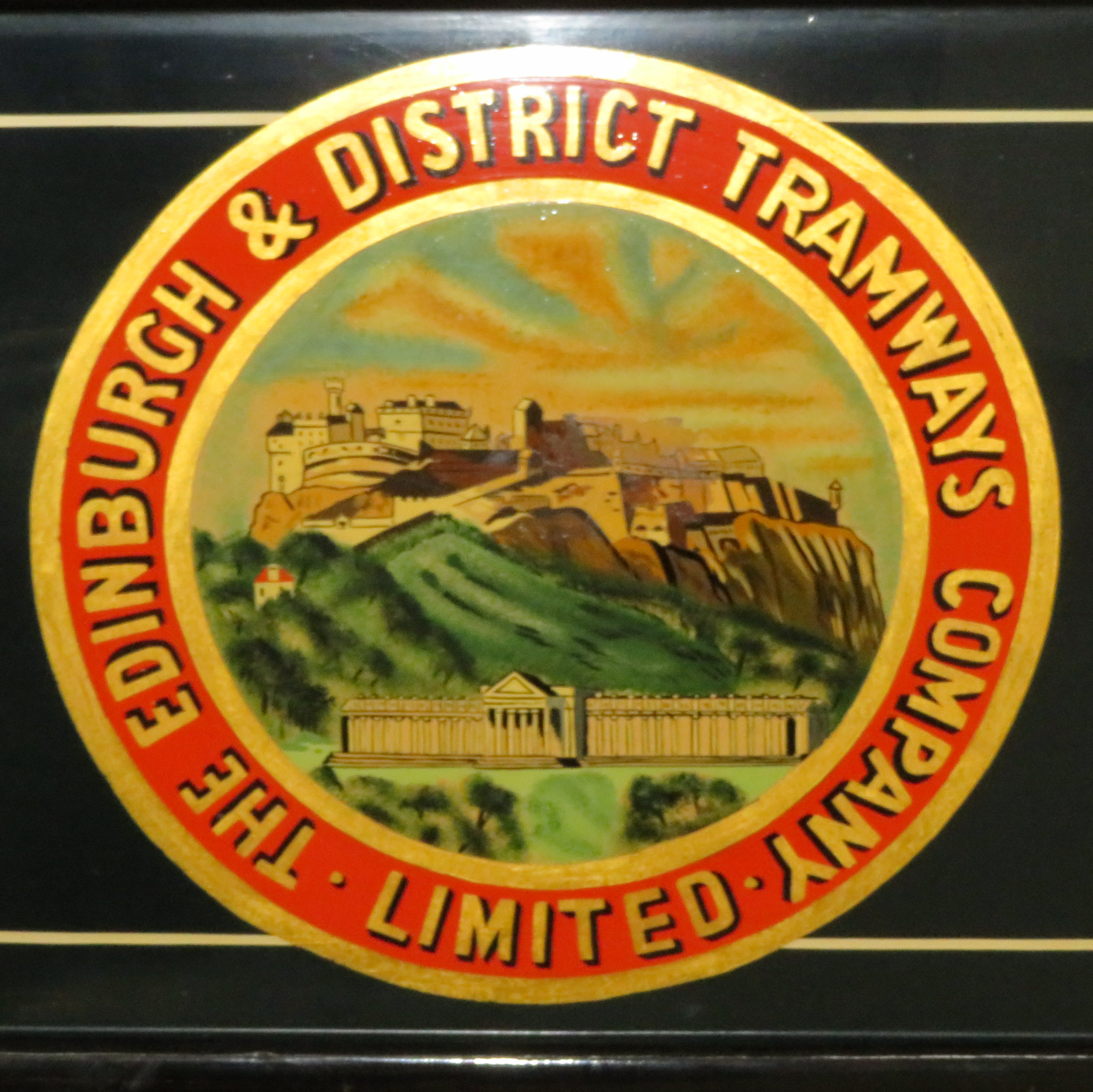

Operation
- Locale: Edinburgh
- Open: 9 December 1893
- Close: 1 July 1919
- Status: Closed

Infrastructure
- Track gauge: 1,435 mm (4 ft 8 1/2 in)
- Propulsion systems: Horse, Steam and Cable

Statistics
- Route length: 18.65 miles (30.01 km)

Edinburgh and District Tramways operated a tramway service in Edinburgh between 1893 and 1919, and Leith between 1871 and 1904.

== History ==
The company was formed as a subsidiary of Dick, Kerr & Co. On 9 December 1893 it took over the Edinburgh Street Tramways services within the Edinburgh city boundary. On 31 January 1896 it took over the line to Meadowbank operated by the same company, and in 1898 the line to Portobello.

On 1 January 1897 it took over the Edinburgh Northern Tramways cable operated lines.

The company also undertook a conversion programme replacing many horse drawn services with cable operated lines. The choice of cable traction was driven by the gradients on many streets in Edinburgh.

The cable lines included:

- Princes St and Leith Walk to Pilrig
- Princes St and St Andrews St, York Place, Leith Walk, London Road to Abbeyhill Opened on 1 June 1899.
- Salisbury Place, Clerk St, Grange Road, Beaufort Road, Strathearn Road, Strathearn Place, Greenhill Gardens, Church Hill to Morningside Road
- Waterloo Place, Regent Road, London Road, Jock's Lodge, Piersfield Terrace, Moira Terrace, Inchview Terrace, Portobello High Street, Abercorn Terrace to Joppa
- Gilmore Place via Granville Terrace, Polwarth Terrace, Colinton Road to Craiglockhart. Opened 1908.
- Leith Walk, Broughton Street to Canonmills. Opened 1908.

In 1902, one of its tramcars was sold to the Stirling and Bridge of Allan Tramways and in 1913 this vehicle was converted with a petrol engine.

== Closure ==
The company was taken over on 1 July 1919 by Edinburgh Corporation Tramways.
