= Edinburgh Street Tramways =

Former tram system in Scotland

Operation
- Locale: Edinburgh
- Open: 6 November 1871
- Close: 23 October 1904
- Status: Closed

Infrastructure
- Track gauge: 1,435 mm (4 ft 8 1/2 in)
- Propulsion system: Horse

Statistics
- Route length: 18.53 miles (29.82 km)

Edinburgh Street Tramways operated a horse-drawn tramway service in Edinburgh between 1871 and 1896, and Leith between 1871 and 1904.

== History ==
Edinburgh Tramways Act 1871
- Act of Parliament
- Parliament of the United Kingdom
- Long title: An Act to authorise the construction of Street Tramways in certain parts of Edinburgh, Leith, and Portobello; and for other purposes.
- Citation: 34 & 35 Vict. c. lxxxix

Dates
- Royal assent: 29 June 1871

Other legislation
- Repealed by: Edinburgh Corporation Order Confirmation Act 1932

Status: Repealed

Text of statute as originally enacted

Services started on 6 November 1871 from Haymarket in Edinburgh to Bernard Street in Leith.

== Closure ==
On 9 December 1893, Edinburgh and District Tramways took over the lines operated by the company within the Edinburgh city boundary. On 31 January 1896 they took over the line to Meadowbank. On 23 October 1904, Leith Corporation Tramways took over the lines operated by the company within the Leith town boundary, and Edinburgh Street Tramways ceased to trade.

Car 23 survives, owned by the Edinburgh Horse Tram Trust, and has been restored and is on display at the Scottish Vintage Bus Museum at Lathalmond.
