= Leith Corporation Tramways =

Tramway operator in Scotland

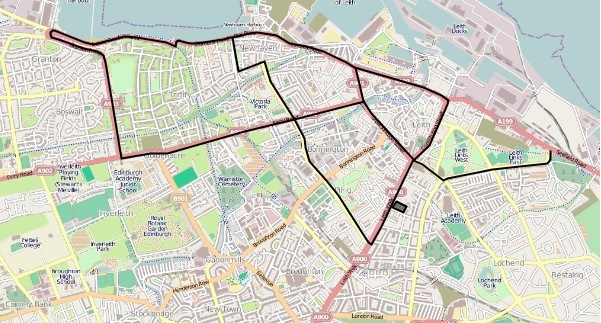
- Map of Leith Corporation Tramways routes

Operation
- Locale: Leith
- Open: 34 October 1904
- Close: 20 November 1920
- Status: Closed

Infrastructure
- Track gauge: 1,435 mm (4 ft 8 1/2 in)
- Propulsion system: Electric

Statistics
- Route length: 9.09 miles (14.63 km)

Leith Corporation Tramways operated a passenger tramway service in Leith between 1904 and 1920.

== History ==
On 23 October 1904, Leith Corporation Tramways took over operation of the Edinburgh Street Tramways routes within the corporation district. The electrification and modernisation was undertaken immediately, and the first electric service ran on 18 August 1905.

The fleet livery was munich lake and ivory.

Passengers going from Leith to Edinburgh had to change trams (from electric to cable-drawn) at Pilrig on Leith Walk at the boundary between Leith and Edinburgh. This confused exchange of passengers was known locally as "the Pilrig muddle", and lasted until the electrification of the Edinburgh Corporation Tramways system.

== Takeover and closure ==
The services were taken over by Edinburgh Corporation Tramways on 10 November 1920 and continued to operate until 1956.
