= Guy Arab =

Bus chassis manufactured by Guy Motors

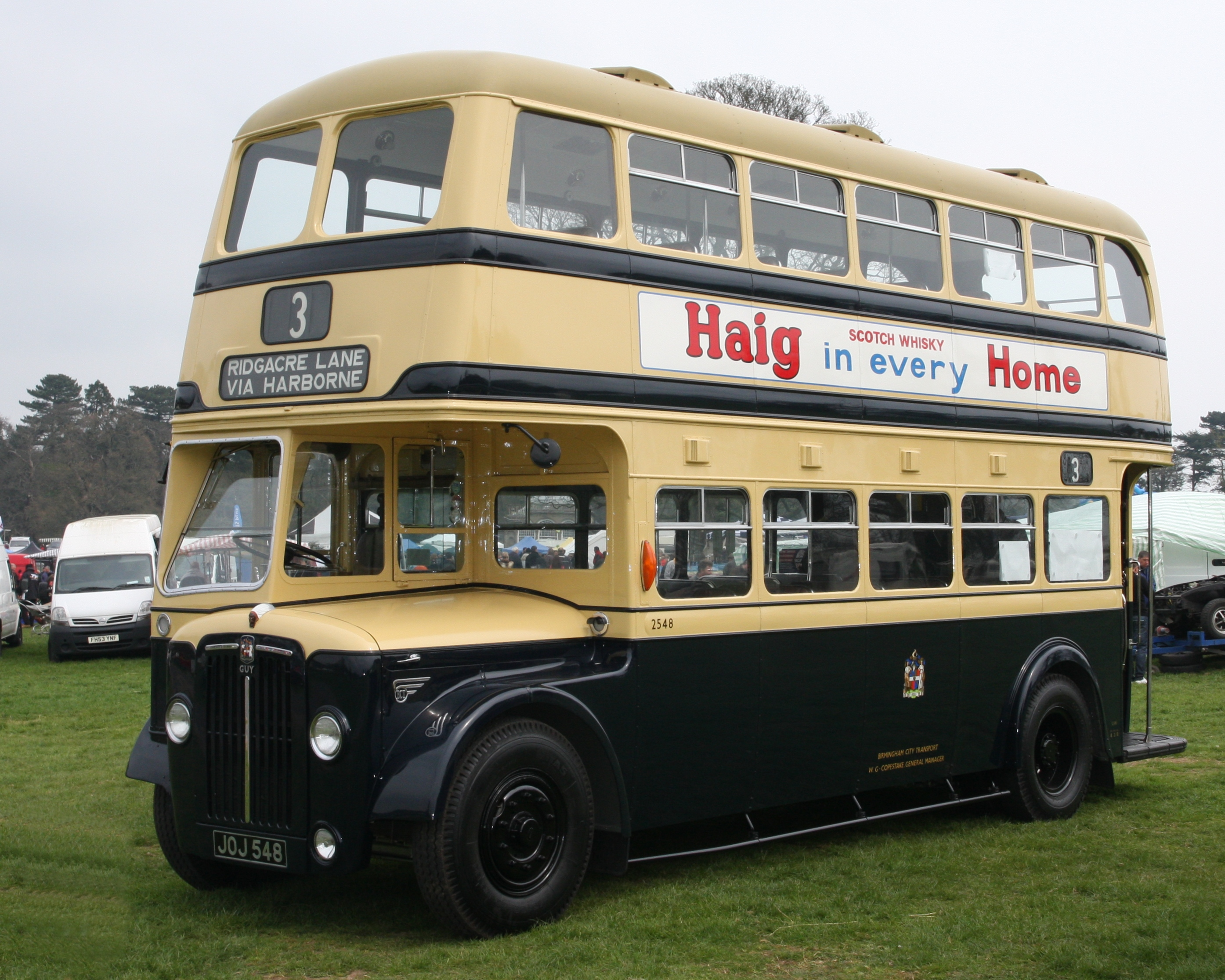
- Preserved Birmingham Corporation Tramways Guy Arab IV

Overview
- Manufacturer: Guy Motors
- Production: 1933–1970s
- Assembly: Wolverhampton

Powertrain
- Engine: Gardner; Rolls-Royce

The Guy Arab was a bus chassis manufactured by Guy Motors. It was introduced in 1933 as a double deck chassis.

In 1942, Guy launched a modified version with wartime constraints requiring components previously made of aluminium to be made from cast iron, increasing its weight by 20%. Over 2,500 were built during the war years.

After the war, a single deck version was introduced, while a new double deck version, the Arab III, was introduced. It remained in production until the 1970s.

The West Riding Automobile Company of Wakefield had a large number of Guy Arabs and one, KHL 855, is preserved at the Dewsbury Bus Museum and has been restored to "as delivered" condition.

In Hong Kong, Guy Arab V was one of the most iconic bus models of the now defunct China Motor Bus (CMB) company. They have been serving on CMB routes from the 1950s until 1997. Part of CMB's Guy Arab V fleet were converted from single-deckers to double-deckers with a rebuilt bodywork in late 1960s to early 1970s.

== Gallery ==
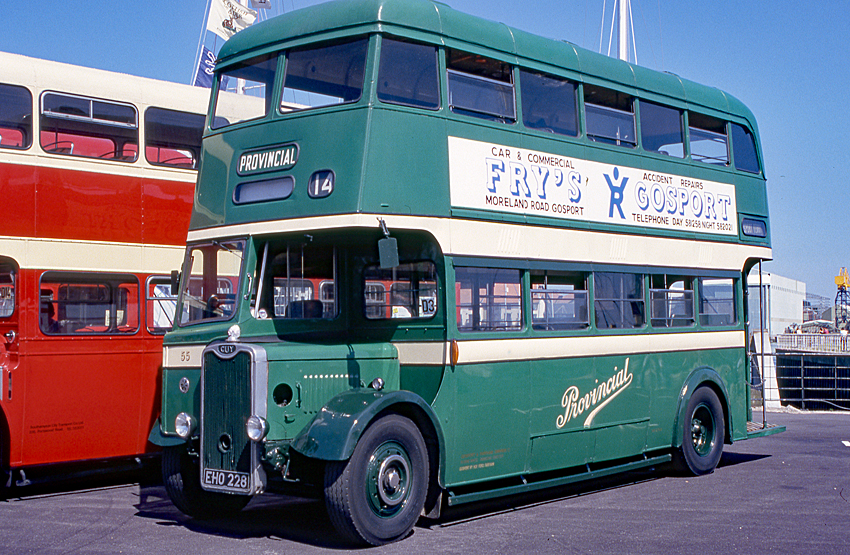
Provincial war time utility Guy Arab II, built 1942

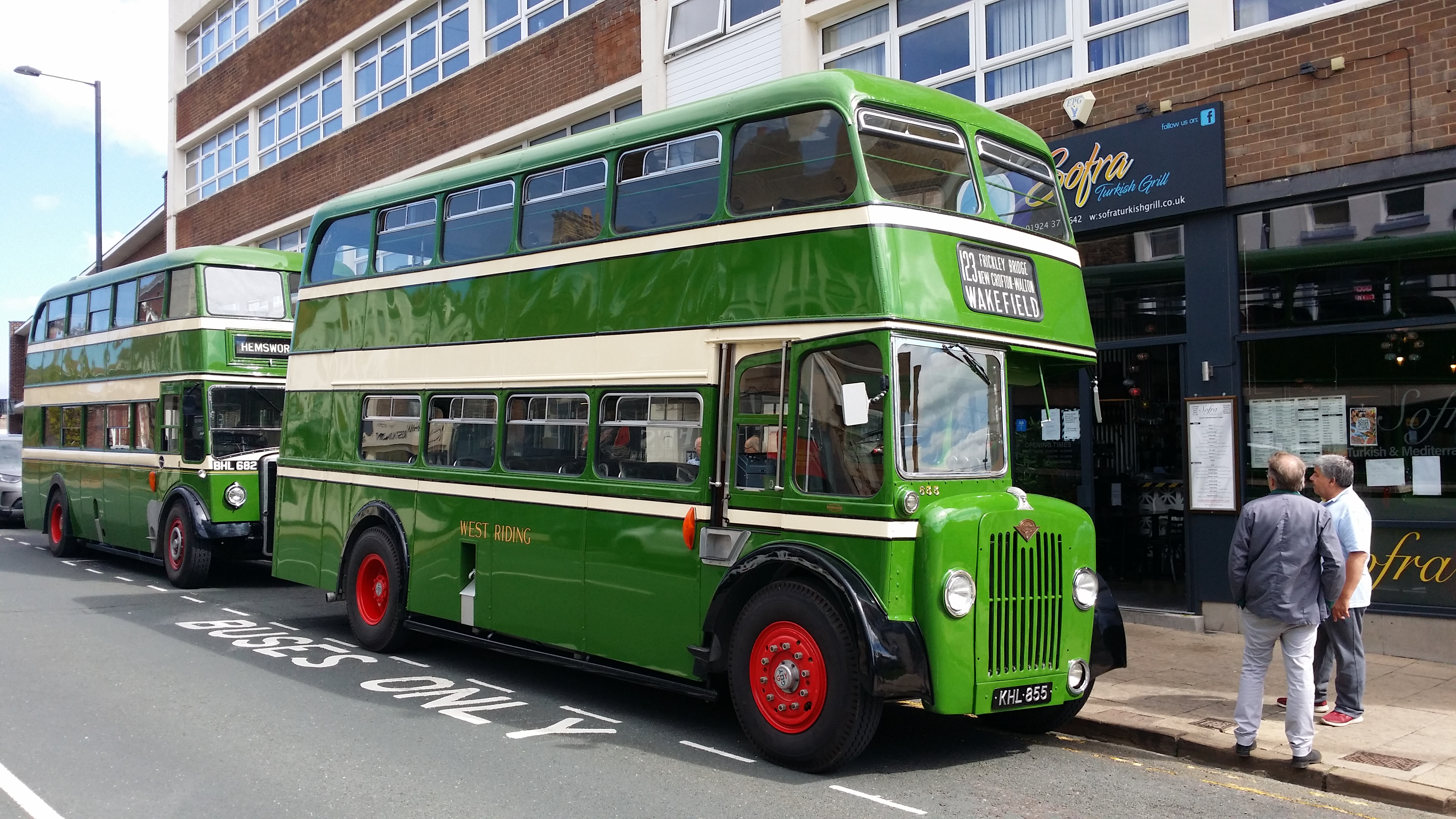
West Riding no. 458 was a Guy Arab IV, built 1957

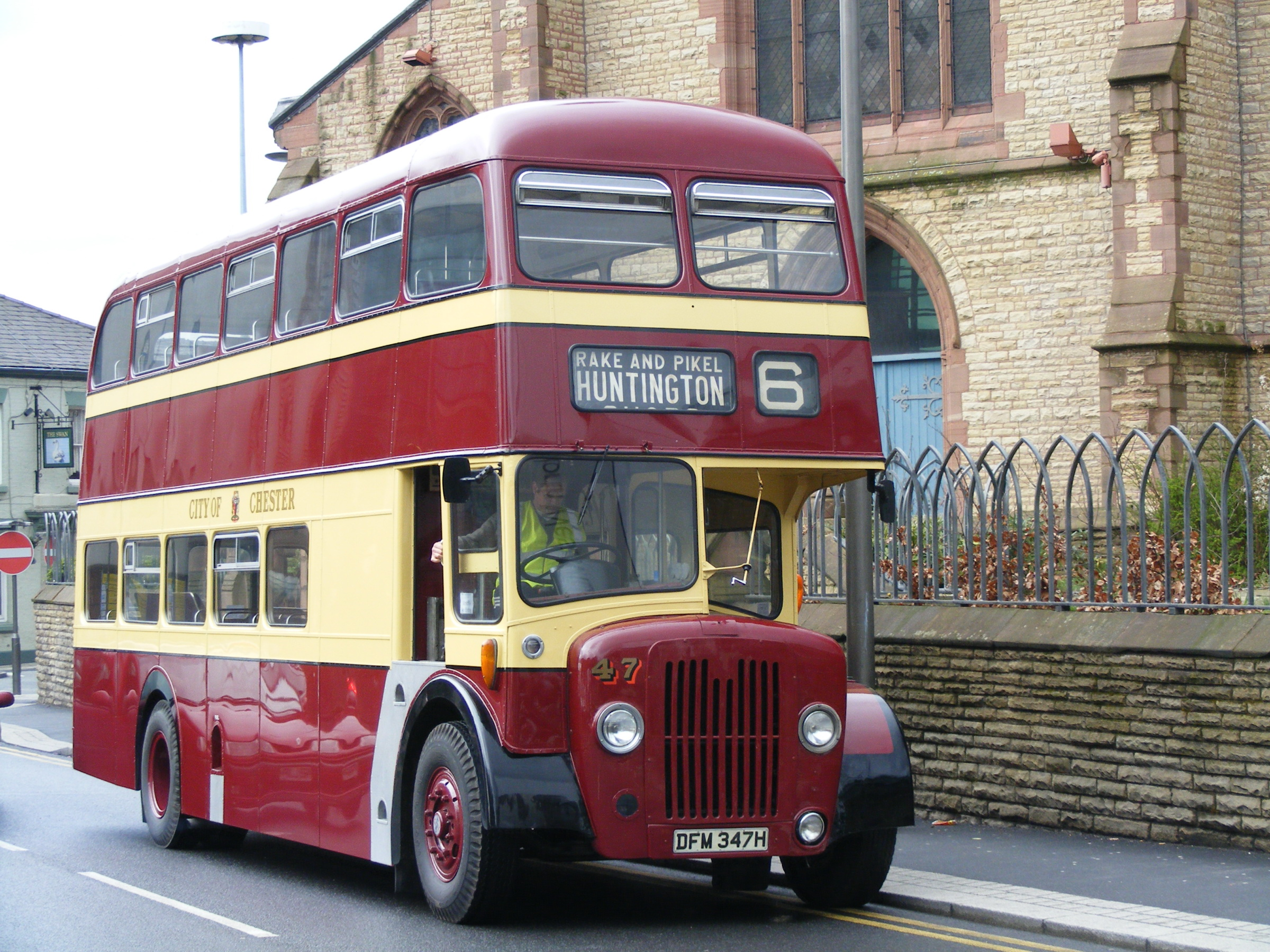
The final Guy Arab V bus to be built was supplied to Chester City Transport in 1969 as their no. 47
