= Edinburgh Northern Tramways =

Tramway operator in Scotland

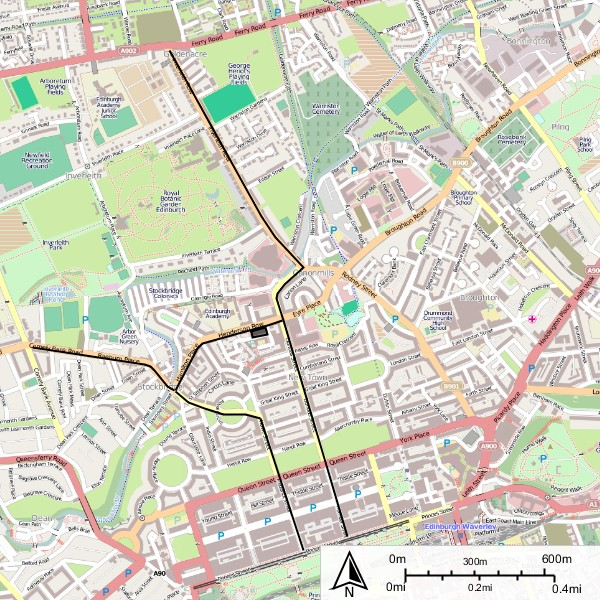
- Map of the routes of the Edinburgh Northern Tramways

Operation
- Locale: Edinburgh
- Open: 28 January 1888
- Close: 1 January 1897
- Status: Closed

Infrastructure
- Track gauge: 1,435 mm (4 ft 8 1/2 in)
- Propulsion system: Cable

Statistics
- Route length: 2.61 miles (4.20 km)

Edinburgh Northern Tramways operated a cable hauled tramway service in Edinburgh between 1888 and 1897.

== History ==
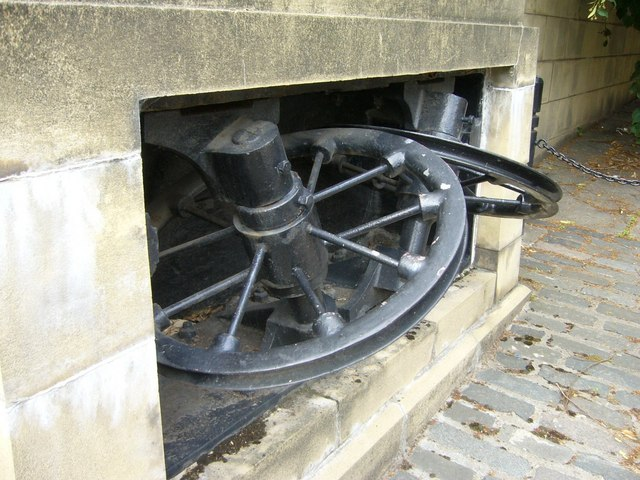
Tram cable pulley unit at the Henderson Row depot in Stockbridge (now an insurance company office)

The service started on 28 January 1888 with a line along Hanover Street and Dundas Street to Ferry Road, Goldenacre. The depot and power station were located on Henderson Row. A second line opened on 17 February 1890 from George Street along Frederick Street and Howe Street through Stockbridge to Comely Bank.

== Closure ==
On 1 January 1897 it was taken over by the Edinburgh and District Tramways.
