= Scottish Vintage Bus Museum =

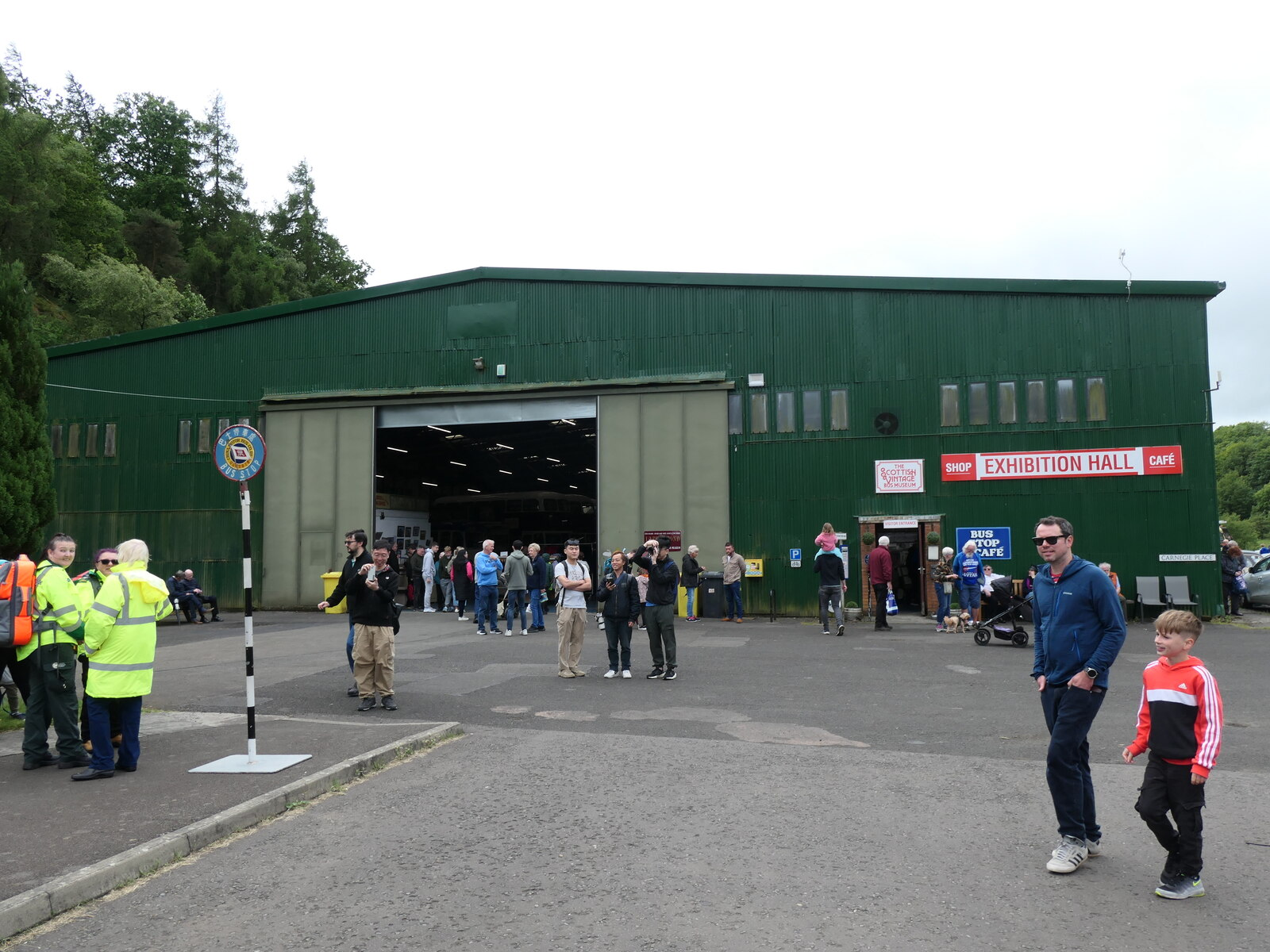
- The Exhibition Hall of the museum in June 2025
- Established: 1986
- Location: M90 Commerce Park; Lathalmond, by Dunfermline; Fife; KY12 0SJ
- Coordinates: 56.112°N 3.458°W
- Type: Transport museum
- Website: http://www.svbm.org.uk

The Scottish Vintage Bus Museum is a transport museum in Lathalmond, 2.5 miles north of Dunfermline, Fife. The museum is open every Sunday between April and the start of October.

== History ==
The museum was established in 1986 in Whitburn, West Lothian, before moving to its current location at Lathalmond, formerly part of the Royal Navy Stores Depot, in 1995. The museum owns half of the site at Lathalmond which is around 45 acres.

== Collection ==
There are around 160 buses based at Lathalmond. The collection also includes around 30 other vehicles. On site, there is a small railway collection which is on loan to the museum from the Scottish Railway Preservation Society, together with a collection of classic cars and lorries, a restored steam roller and a restored horse tram.

The museum is a registered charity and the collection is managed by a board made up of mainly trustees.
