= List of libraries in Scotland =

This is a list of libraries in Scotland.

== National Libraries ==
- National Library of Scotland, Edinburgh

== Public libraries by local authority area ==
=== Aberdeen City ===
- Kincorth Library
- Aberdeen Central Library
- Airyhall Library
- Bridge of Don Library
- Bucksburn Library
- Cornhill Library
- Cove Library (Aberdeen, Scotland)
- Culter Library
- Cults Library and Learning Centre
- Dyce Library
- Ferryhill Library
- Kaimhill Library
- Mastrick Library
- Northfield Library
- Tillydrone Library
- Torry Library
- Woodside Library

=== Aberdeenshire ===
- Aberchirder Library
- Aberdeenshire Library and Information Service Library Headquarters
- Aboyne Library
- Alford Library
- Ballater Library
- Balmedie Library
- Banchory Library
- Banff Library
- Boddam Library
- Bracoden Library
- Cairnbulg/Inverallochy Library
- Cruden Bay Library
- Ellon Library
- Fettercairn Library
- Fraserburgh Library
- Huntly Library
- Insch Library
- Inverbervie Library
- Inverurie Library
- Kemnay Library
- Kintore Library
- Macduff Library
- Mearns Community Library
- Meldrum Library
- Mintlaw Library
- New Pitsligo Library
- Newmachar Library
- Newtonhill Library
- Peterhead Library
- Portlethen Library
- Portsoy Library
- Rosehearty Library
- Stonehaven Library
- Strichen Library
- Turriff Library
- Westhill Library

=== Angus ===
- Arbroath Library
- Brechin Library
- Carnoustie Library
- Forfar Library
- Kirriemuir Library
- Monifieth Library
- Montrose Library

=== Argyll and Bute ===
- Campbeltown Library
- Cardross Library
- Dunoon Library
- Helensburgh Library
- Lochgilphead Library
- Oban Library
- Rosneath Library
- Rothesay Library
- Tarbert Library

=== Clackmannanshire ===
- Alloa Library
- Alva Community Access Point
- Tillicoultry Library
- Sauchie Library
- Tullibody Library

=== Dumfries and Galloway ===
- Annan Library
- Castle Douglas Library
- Dalbeattie Library
- Dalry Library (Castle Douglas, Scotland)
- Eastriggs Library
- Ewart Library
- Gatehouse Library
- Georgetown Library
- Gretna Library and Customer Service Centre
- Kirkconnel Library
- Kirkcudbright Library
- Langholm Library
- Lochmaben Library
- Lochside Library
- Lochthorn Library
- Lockerbie Library
- Moffat Library
- Newton Stewart Library
- Port William Library
- Sanquhar Library
- Stranraer Library
- Thornhill Library
- Whithorn Library
- Wigtown Library

=== Dundee ===
- Ardler Community Library
- Arthurstone Community Library
- Charleston Community Centre and Library
- Coldside Community Library
- Douglas Community and Library Centre
- Dundee City Council. Central Library
- Dundee City Council. HUB Community Centre and Library
- Fintry Community Library
- Kirkton Community Centre and Library
- Lochee Community Library
- Menzieshill Community Centre and Library
- Whitfield Community Library & Learning Centre
- Blackness Community Library
- Broughty Ferry Community Library

=== East Ayrshire ===
- Auchinleck Library
- Bellfield Library
- Crosshouse Library
- Cumnock Library
- Dalmellington Library
- Dalrymple Library
- Darvel Library
- Drongan Library
- East Ayrshire Leisure. Dick Institute
- Galston Library
- Kilmaurs Library
- Mauchline Library
- New Cumnock Library
- Newmilns Library
- Patna Community Library
- Stewarton Library

=== East Dunbartonshire ===
- Bishopbriggs Library
- Brookwood Library
- Craighead Library
- Lennoxtown Library
- Lenzie Library
- Milngavie Library
- Westerton Library
- William Patrick Library

=== East Lothian ===
- Dunbar Library
- East Linton Library
- Gullane Library
- Haddington Library
- John Gray Centre (Library)
- Longniddry Library
- Musselburgh Library
- North Berwick Library
- Ormiston Library
- Port Seton Library
- Prestonpans Library
- Tranent Library
- Wallyford Library

=== East Renfrewshire ===
- Barrhead Community Library
- Thornliebank Library
- Giffnock Library
- Clarkston Library
- Netherlee Library
- Busby Library
- Eaglesham Community Library
- Mearns Community Library
- Neilston Community Library
- Uplawmoor Community Library

=== City of Edinburgh ===
- Balerno Library
- Balgreen Library
- Blackhall Library
- Colinton Library
- Corstorphine Library
- Craigmillar Library
- Currie Library
- Drumbrae Library
- Edinburgh Central Library
- Fountainbridge Library
- Gilmerton Library
- Granton Library
- Kirkliston Library
- Leith Community Library
- McDonald Road Library
- Moredun Library
- Morningside Library
- Muirhouse Library
- Newington Library
- Oxgangs Library
- Piershill Library
- Portobello Library
- Ratho Library
- Sighthill Library
- South Neighbourhood Office and Library
- South Queensferry Library
- Stockbridge library
- Wester Hailes Library

=== Eilean Siar ===
- Castlebay Library
- Daliburgh Community Library
- Lionacleit Community Library
- Shawbost Community Library
- Stornoway Library
- Tarbert Community Library

=== Falkirk ===
- Bo'ness Library
- Bonnybridge Library
- Denny Library
- Falkirk Library
- Grangemouth Library
- Larbert Library
- Meadowbank Library
- Slamannan Library

=== Fife ===
- Aberdour Library
- Anstruther Library
- Auchtermuchty Library
- Benarty Library
- Buckhaven Library and Museum
- Burntisland Library and Museum
- Cadham Library
- Cardenden Library
- Cupar Library
- Dalgety Bay Library
- Duloch Community Campus
- Dunfermline Carnegie Library
- Elie Library
- Fountainbrae Library
- Henry Tudor Library
- Inverkeithing Library and Heritage Centre
- Kelty Library
- Kennoway Library
- Kirkcaldy Galleries
- Ladybank Library
- Leslie Library
- Leven Library
- Methil Library and Local Office
- Newport Library and Heritage Centre
- Oakley Library
- Rosyth Library
- Rothes Halls Library
- St Andrews Library
- St Monans Library
- Tayport Library
- Templehall Library
- Valleyfield Library

=== City of Glasgow ===
- Anniesland Library and Learning Centre
- Baillieston Library and Learning Centre
- Barmulloch Library and Learning Centre
- Bridgeton Library and Learning Centre
- Busby Community Library
- Cardonald Library and Learning Centre
- Castlemilk Library and Learning Centre
- Clarkston Community Library
- Couper Institute Library
- Dennistoun Library and Learning Centre
- Drumchapel Library and Learning Centre
- Easterhouse - The Library at the Bridge
- Elder Park Library and Learning Centre
- Giffnock Community Library
- Gorbals Library and Learning Centre
- Govanhill Library and Learning Centre
- Hillhead Library and Learning Centre
- Ibrox Library and Learning Centre
- Knightswood Library and Learning Centre
- Langside Library and Learning Centre
- Library at GOMA
- Maryhill Library and Learning Centre
- Milton Library and Learning Centre
- Netherlee Community Library
- Parkhead Library and Learning Centre
- Partick Library and Learning Centre
- Pollok Library and Learning Centre
- Pollokshaws Library and Learning Centre
- Pollokshields Library and Learning Centre
- Possilpark Library and Learning Centre
- Riddrie Library and Learning Centre
- Royston Library and Learning Centre
- Shettleston Library and Learning Centre
- Springburn Library and Learning Centre
- The Mitchell Library
- Thornliebank Community Library
- Whiteinch Library and Learning Centre
- Woodside Library and Learning Centre

=== Highland ===
- Achiltibuie Library
- Alness Library
- Ardersier Library
- Ardnamurchan Community Library
- Aviemore Library
- Badenoch Library and Learning Centre
- Beauly Library
- Belford Library
- Bettyhill Library/Service Point
- Bonar Bridge Library
- Broadford Library and Service Point
- Brora Library
- Caol Library
- Cromarty Library
- Culloden Library
- Dingwall Library
- Dornoch Library
- Fort William Library
- Fortrose Community Library
- Gairloch Library
- Glenurquhart Community Library
- Golspie Library
- Grantown on Spey Library
- Helmsdale Library/Service Point
- Inshes Community Library
- Invergordon Library
- Inverness Library
- Kinlochleven Library
- Knoydart Library
- Kyle of Lochalsh Library
- Lairg Library Community Centre
- Lochcarron Library
- Muir of Ord Library
- Nairn Library
- Plockton Library
- Portree Community Library
- Tain Library
- Thurso Library
- Ullapool Community Library
- Wick Library

=== Inverclyde ===
- Gourock Library
- Greenock Central Library
- Inverkip and Wemyss Bay Library
- Kilmacolm Library
- Port Glasgow Library
- South West Branch Library
- Watt Library

=== Midlothian ===
- Dalkeith Library
- Danderhall Library
- Gorebridge Library
- Lasswade Library
- Loanhead Library
- Newbattle Library
- Newtongrange Library
- Penicuik Library
- Roslin Library

=== Moray ===
- Aberlour Library
- Buckie Library
- Burghead Library
- Cullen Library
- Dufftown Library
- Elgin Library
- Forres Library
- Keith Library
- Lossiemouth Library
- Milne's Learning Centre
- Tomintoul Library

=== North Ayrshire ===
- Ardrossan Library
- Arran Library
- Beattie Library
- Beith Library
- Bourtreehill Library
- Dalry Library (Dalry, Scotland)
- Dreghorn Library
- Fairlie Library
- Irvine Library
- Kilbirnie Library
- Kilwinning Library
- Largs Library
- Millport Library
- Saltcoats Library
- Skelmorlie Library
- Springside Library
- West Kilbride Library

=== North Lanarkshire ===
- Abronhill Library
- Airdrie Public Library
- Bellshill Cultural Centre Library
- Chapelhall Library
- Chryston Library
- Cleland Library
- Coatbridge Library
- Condorrat Library
- Cumbernauld Central Library
- Eastfield Library
- Kilsyth Library
- Moodiesburn Library
- Motherwell Library
- New Stevenston Library
- Newarthill Library
- Newmains Library
- Shotts Library
- Stepps Library
- Viewpark Library
- Wishaw Library

=== Orkney Islands ===
- Orkney Library and Archive
- Stromness Library

=== Perth & Kinross ===
- A. K. Bell Library: Library Headquarters
- Alyth Library
- Auchterarder Library
- Birnam Library
- Blairgowrie Library
- Breadalbane Community Library
- Comrie Library
- Coupar Angus Library
- Loch Leven Community Library
- North Inch Community Library
- Pitlochry Library
- Scone Library
- Strathearn Community Library

=== Renfrewshire ===
- Bishopton Library
- Bridge of Weir Library
- Erskine Library
- Ferguslie Park Library
- Foxbar Library
- Glenburn Library
- Johnstone Library
- Linwood Library
- Lochwinnoch Library
- Paisley Central Library
- Ralston Library
- Renfrew Library

=== Scottish Borders ===
- Coldstream Library
- Duns Library
- Earlston Library
- Eyemouth Library
- Galashiels Library
- Hawick Library
- Innerleithen Library Contact Centre
- Jedburgh Library
- Kelso Library
- Melrose Library
- Peebles Library
- Selkirk Library

=== Shetland Islands ===
- Shetland Library

=== South Ayrshire ===
- Alloway Library
- Ballantrae Library
- Forehill Library
- Girvan Library
- Maybole Library
- Mossblown Library
- Prestwick Library
- South Ayrshire Libraries. Carnegie Library
- Symington Library
- Tarbolton Lorimer Library
- Troon Library

=== South Lanarkshire ===
- Biggar Public Library
- Blackwood and Kirkmuirhill Community Wing (Library)
- Blantyre Library
- Bothwell Library
- Burnbank Library
- Calderwood Library
- Cambuslang Library
- Carluke Library
- Cathkin Library
- East Kilbride Central Library
- Fairhill Library
- Forth Library
- Greenhills Library
- Halfway Library
- Hamilton Town House Library
- Hillhouse Library
- King's Park Library
- Lanark Library
- Larkhall Library
- Lesmahagow Library
- Rutherglen Library
- St Leonards Library
- Stonehouse Library
- Strathaven Library
- Uddingston Library

=== Stirling ===
- Balfron Library
- Bannockburn Library
- Bridge of Allan Library
- Callander Library
- Cambusbarron Library
- Cowie Library
- Doune Library
- Drymen Library
- Dunblane Library
- Fallin Library
- Killin Library
- Plean Library
- Raploch Xpress Library
- St Ninians Library
- Stirling Council Library Service. Central Library
- Strathblane Library

=== West Dunbartonshire ===
- Alexandria Library
- Balloch Library
- Clydebank Library
- Dalmuir Library
- Dumbarton Library
- Duntocher Library
- Parkhall Library

=== West Lothian ===
- Almondbank Library
- Armadale Community Centre and Library
- Bathgate Library
- Blackburn Connected
- Blackridge Library
- Broxburn Library
- Carmondean Library
- East Calder Library
- Fauldhouse Partnership Centre
- Lanthorn Library
- Linlithgow Library
- Pumpherston Library
- West Calder Library
- Whitburn Library

== Specialised libraries ==
- Advocates Library, Edinburgh
- Innerpeffray Library
- Glasgow Women's Library
- Royal Botanic Garden Edinburgh
- Royal Faculty of Procurators in Glasgow
- Royal Medical Society, Edinburgh
- Scottish Poetry Library, Edinburgh
- Signet Library, Edinburgh

== Academic libraries ==
- Andersonian Library, University of Strathclyde
- Edinburgh University Library
- Glasgow University Library
- Hunterian Collection, University of Glasgow

== See also ==
- Books in the United Kingdom
- List of libraries in the United Kingdom
