= BNJ =

BNJ may refer to:

- Bailie Nicol Jarvie whisky, distilled in Scotland.
- Bonn Hauptbahnhof station, in Germany, according to the IATA code list of stations
- The British Numismatic Journal, an academic journal published by the British Numismatic Society
- Brill's New Jacoby, the updated edition with English translation of Felix Jacoby's Fragmente der griechischen Historiker
- Hangelar-Bonn airport in Sankt Augustin, Germany, according to the list of IATA airport codes
