= Couper Institute Library =

Coordinates: 55.81604°N 4.26429°W

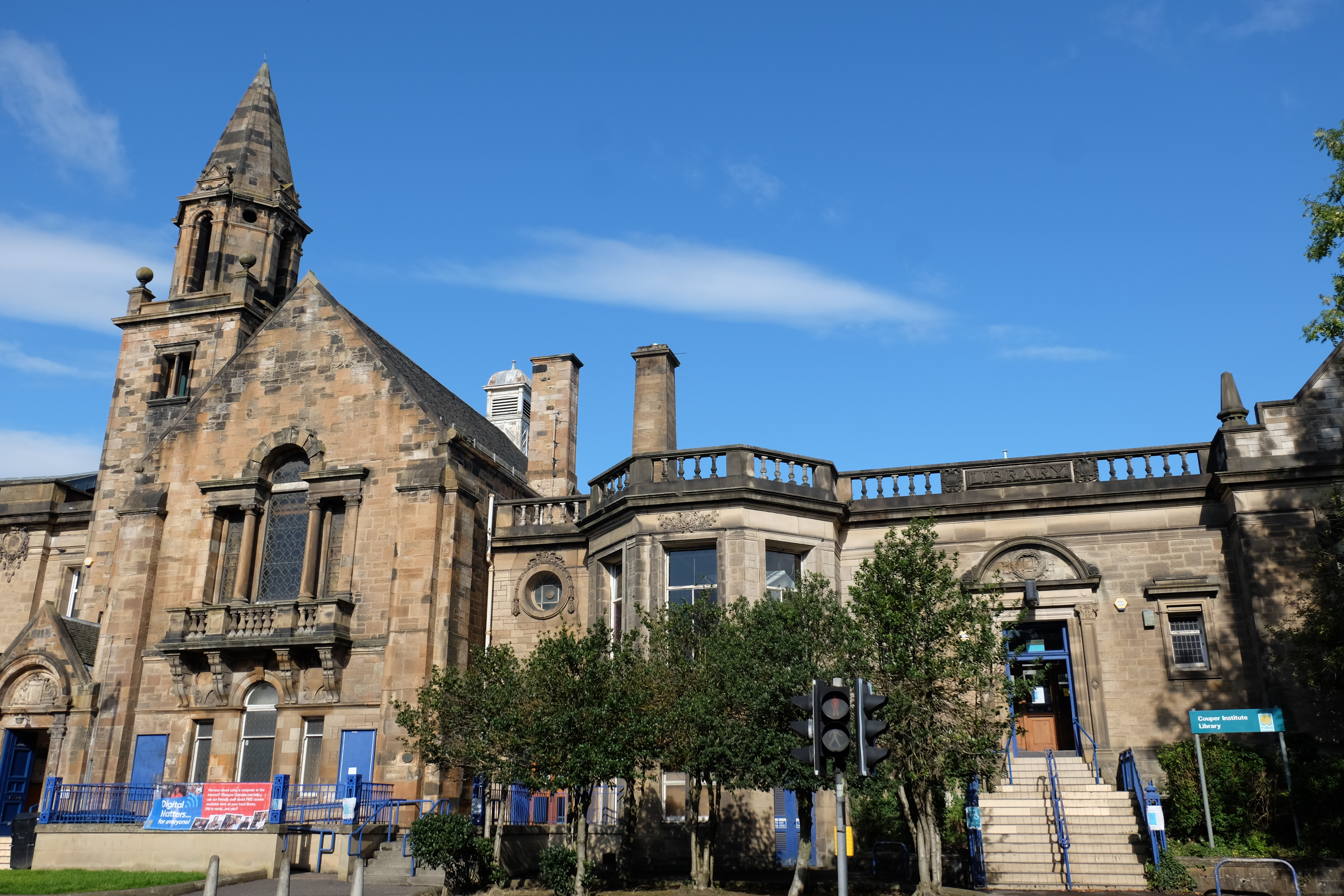
- Couper Institute Library (right) and Couper Institute (left)
- Interactive map of Couper Institute Library

General information
- Location: 84-86 Clarkston Road, Cathcart, Glasgow G44 3DA
- Opened: 1924

Website
- https://www.glasgowlife.org.uk/libraries/venues/couper-institute-library

The Couper Institute Library is a public library situated in Cathcart, Glasgow, Scotland. The Couper Institute was originally built by architects Campbell Douglas and James Sellars. The library was added in 1923 by architect John Alfred Taylor Houston on the bequest of Robert Couper. The institute and its library are now are now listed buildings, category B.

== History ==
The library was built in 1923-24 by J A T Houston as part of building extensions to the northern side of the existing Couper Institute (built 1887) which were delayed by the First World War. The library was designed in an English Baroque style, while the earlier hall presents the Scots Renaissance tradition.

Local paper mill owner Robert Couper left 'about £8000' for a library, reading room and hall to be built on the site.

The building was listed as category B by Historic Environment Scotland in 1970.

The library was closed during the Covid19 pandemic in 2020 and Glasgow City Council initially planned not to reopen it. Following a local campaign to Save the Couper, the library was reopened in 2022.

== See also ==
- List of libraries in Scotland
