= George Coull =

Scottish pharmaceutical chemist

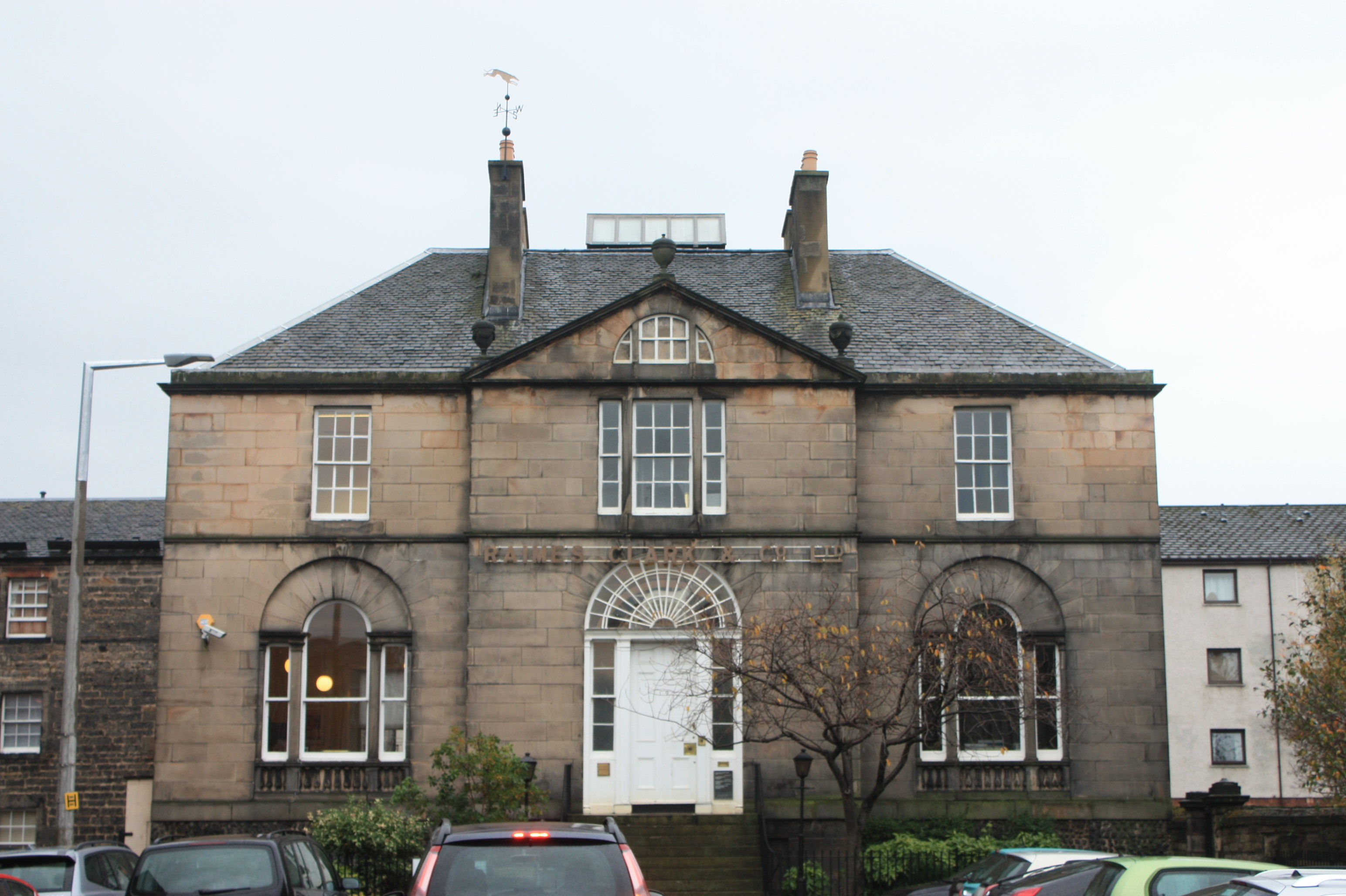
The impressive villa terminating Smiths Place in Leith was George Coull's home and the office of Raimes Clark & Co

Dr George Coull FRSE (1862? – 10 January 1934) was a Scottish pharmaceutical chemist. He served as Managing Director of Raimes Clark & Co, parent company to Scotland's largest independent chemist, Lindsay & Gilmour.

== Life ==
He was born in Edinburgh in about 1862. He attended Daniel Stewart's College where he excelled. He was then apprenticed to a pharmacist, taking extra lessons and exams in pharmacology at Surgeons' Hall.

For most of his life he lived on the first floor of the impressive Georgian villa at the end of Smiths Place, off Leith Walk in Edinburgh, above the offices of Raimes, Clark & Co for whom he acted as managing director.

The University of Edinburgh awarded him a (DSc) in 1899.

He was elected a Fellow of the Royal Society of Edinburgh in 1929. His proposers were George Barger, Alfred Archibald Boon, Alexander Lauder, and Leonard Dobbin. He served on the Board of Examiners for the training of pharmacists in Scotland. He was elected a member of Edinburgh Town Council in 1913 and rose to the level of Bailie of the Burgh. He was also a senior member of the Edinburgh Gas Commission, giving invaluable professional information relating to Edinburgh's gas supply. In 1928-29 he served as President of the Stewarts College Club.

He died on 10 January 1934. He was survived by a widow, two daughters and two sons.
