= Leith Walk =

Street in Edinburgh, Scotland

Coordinates: 55.96361°N 3.17848°W

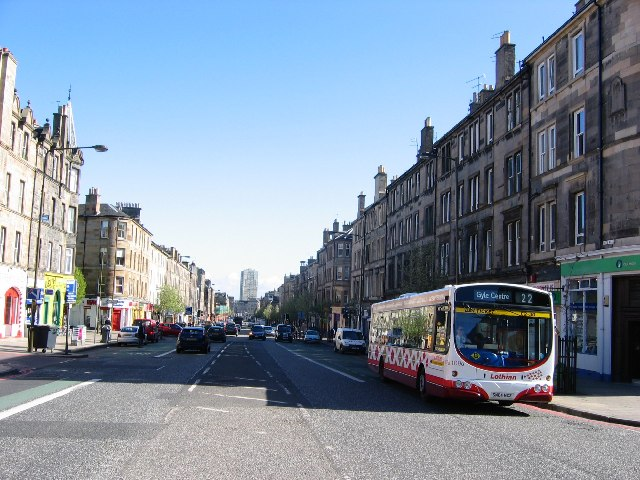
Looking down Leith Walk towards Leith in 2005

Leith Walk is one of the longest streets in Edinburgh, Scotland, and is the main road connecting the east end of the city centre to Leith.

Forming most of the A900 road, it slopes downwards from Union Place at the south-western end of the street to the 'Foot of the Walk' at the north-eastern end, where Great Junction Street, Duke Street, Constitution Street and the Kirkgate meet.

For historical reasons the carriageway is known as Leith Walk but the upper half has several stretches with side names including some parts having different names on opposite sides of the street. Running from its upper (south west) end, on the west side of the street the sections are Union Place, Antigua Street, Gayfield Place and Haddington Place; on the east side, sections are titled Greenside Place, Baxter's Place, Elm Row and Brunswick Place.

It continues (on both sides) as Croall Place, Albert Place, Crighton Place and, after the junction with Pilrig Street, as Leith Walk.

== History ==
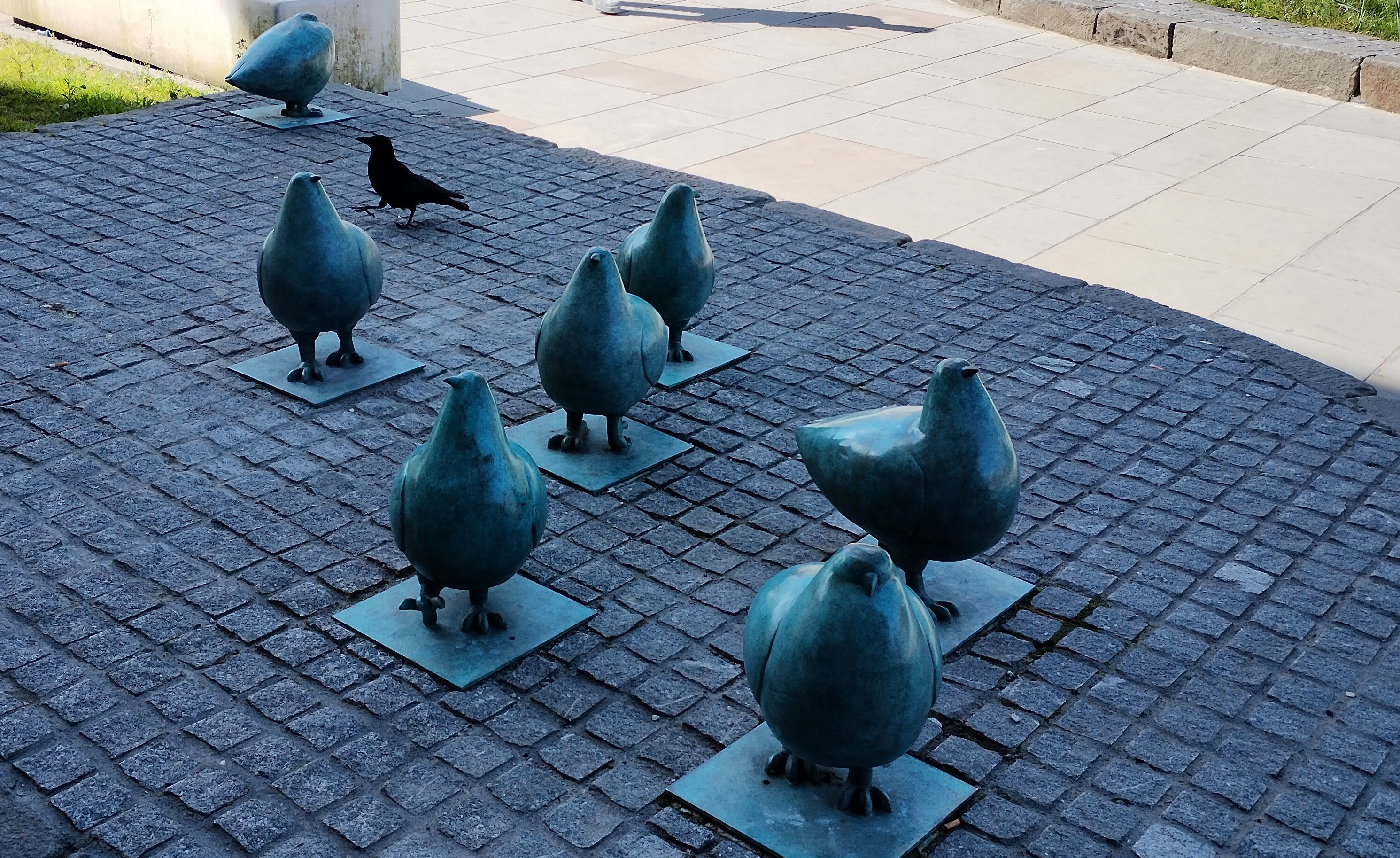
Sculptures of pigeons by Shona Kinloch on Elm Row, Leith Walk

In a Charter in 1456, James II granted land at Greenside in the "valley and low ground lying between the rock commonly called Cragingalt (ie. Calton Hill), on the east side, and the common way and road towards the town of Leith." Archaeological investigation on Leith Walk in relation to the Trams to Newhaven project uncovered evidence of a cobble-lined roadway thought to be between 900 and 600 years old.

According to Robert Chambers, Leith Walk, as we know it, owes its existence to a defensive rampart which was constructed between Calton Hill and Leith in 1650. Chambers says the attack on Edinburgh by Cromwell's army in that year was halted at this line by the Scots under Sir David Leslie (whose army was subsequently defeated at the Battle of Dunbar).

From 1702 until 1711 a Robert Miller employed four coaches to travel between Edinburgh and Leith but his route may have employed Easter Road. From 1722 until 1743 the first reasonably priced coach began and this was certainly on Leith Walk. This carried six passengers and had a fare of 3d in summer and 4d in winter. Respective prices rose to 4d and 6d in 1727.

Daniel Defoe, writing in 1725 and recalling his time in Edinburgh in 1706, described the two features, the roadway and the rampart, as "and all along by the road side, the road itself pav'd with stones like a street, is a broad causeway, or, as we call it, a foot way, very firm, and made by hand at least 20 foot broad, and continued to the town of Leith. This causeway is very well kept at the publick expence, and no horses suffer'd to come upon it."

The majority of traffic was pedestrian which is why the street became known as "the Walk", the name by which it is still known locally. At the time of its creation it provided an alternative (and shorter) route to Edinburgh compared with the older Easter Road and its counterpart Wester Road (present-day Bonnington and Broughton roads) although it did not supersede these routes as the main road to Leith until after the building of the North Bridge, traversable from 1769 and completed in 1772. From 1769 both carriages and horses with riders were permitted on Leith Walk.

To deflect possible opposition to the building of the bridge if it was admitted to be for access to the New Town, the development of which was still controversial, the foundation stone of the bridge, laid by Lord Provost George Drummond, bore the inscription that it was part of "a new road to Leith". As early as 1763 (when work began on building the North Bridge) the Walk had become a coach route with a regular service running from Leith to Edinburgh, departing on the hour, from 8am to 8pm, and run by the Balfours of Pilrig House. The journey took an hour each way, with a rest at the Halfway House at Shrubhill (which existed as a pub until it closed in 1981). At this time it is stated that there were no other coaches in Scotland except the infrequent service from Edinburgh to London.

In 1779, Hugo Arnot, an Edinburgh historian who was born in Leith, stated that 156 coaches travelled the route daily, each carrying 4 passengers at a cost of 2.5d or 3d per person. The road apparently fell into disrepair because of its frequent use by coaches and was not repaired until 1810 when it was relaid as a "splendid causeway" raising the road level by around 6 feet. This was "at great expense by the City of Edinburgh and had a toll erected for its payment".

In April 2023, the tramline was completed, connecting Leith and Newhaven to the City Centre and Edinburgh Airport (EDI). Trams were tested daily for several weeks before opening to the public in June 2023.

== Shrubhill ==
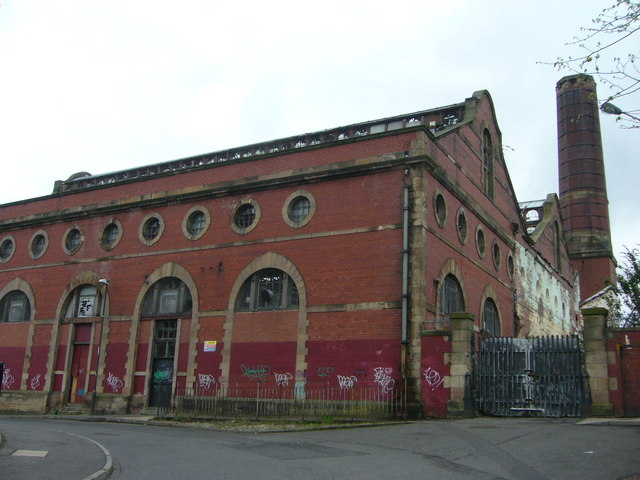
Shrubhill Tramworks prior to redevelopment

Shrubhill is a distinct area of Leith Walk just south of Pilrig. It was once the site of a gibbet known as the Gallow Lee, literally the "field with the gallows"

Several infamous executions took place on the site including that of five Covenanters (Robert Garnock, Patrick Forman, David Farrie, James Stuart and Alexander Russel) in 1681, and of Norman Ross, servant and murderer of Lady Margaret Billie, in 1752.

In 1670, Major Thomas Weir, who had admitted to several sex crimes and accused of witchcraft, was garroted and burnt at the stake at nearby Greenside. His remains were later taken to the Gallow Lee and hung on display in the gibbet.

The bodies of the condemned were buried at the base of the gallows, or their ashes scattered if burnt. The piles of sand and bones at the foot of the gallows were sold to builders constructing the New Town, with the proceeds being used to purchase shrub, a mix of rum and lemon - allegedly where the name Shrub hill originates from.

Shrubhill House was a 17th-century mansion and the home of Jane Gordon, Duchess of Gordon and her parents Lord and Lady Maxwell. It was demolished around 1960, to be replaced with a brutalist office block built in the early 1970s. Also named Shrubhill House, the building was occupied by the city council's social work department until 2007, then quickly becoming derelict until its eventual demolition in 2015.

Until the late 1890s, Shrubhill housed stables for horse-drawn trams operated by Edinburgh Street Tramways. In 1898 a major tram depot with extensive workshops and a power station was built to run a new cable-tram system being rolled out by Edinburgh and District Tramways which began operating in 1905. The network was later electrified in 1926 running until the closure of the tram network in 1956. Afterwards it was a bus depot for Edinburgh Corporation Transport and later Lothian Region Transport, the predecessor of Lothian Buses.

Some of the tramworks' exteriors now form part of a new residential-led mixed use development called The Engine Yards, and a new student accommodation block now occupies the old council offices site, with retail units on Leith Walk.

== Trams ==
=== Leith Corporation Tramways and Edinburgh Corporation Tramways ===
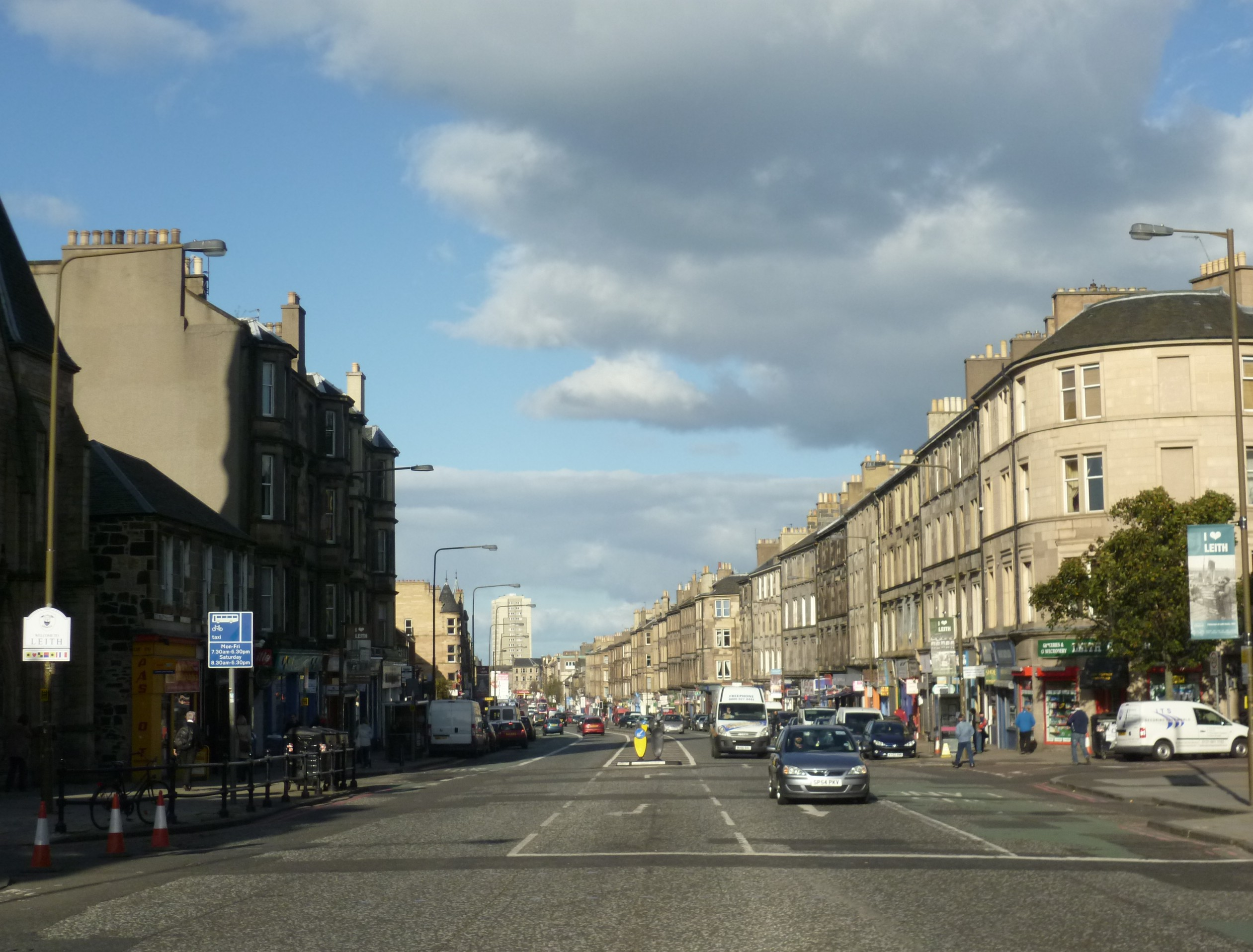
Leith Walk from Pilrig. Site of the Pilrig muddle

Leith Walk was one of the first and last places in Edinburgh and Leith to see trams. Leith had Scotland's first electric tram in 1905, operated by Leith Corporation Tramways. On Leith Walk this terminated at Pilrig Church and passengers had to change to Edinburgh's cable-drawn cars. This inconvenient changeover was known as the Pilrig muddle. A pair of Victorian-era tram cable wheels discovered during the line excavations, were installed in 2023, as a monument to the site at the pedestrianised junction with Iona Street.

Edinburgh Corporation Tramways took over Leith's trams in 1920, however they did not smooth out the problem of the muddle until 1925 when they electrified their own network. Edinburgh's last tram of this earlier era ran in November 1956 terminating at the Shrubhill tram depot.

=== Edinburgh Trams ===
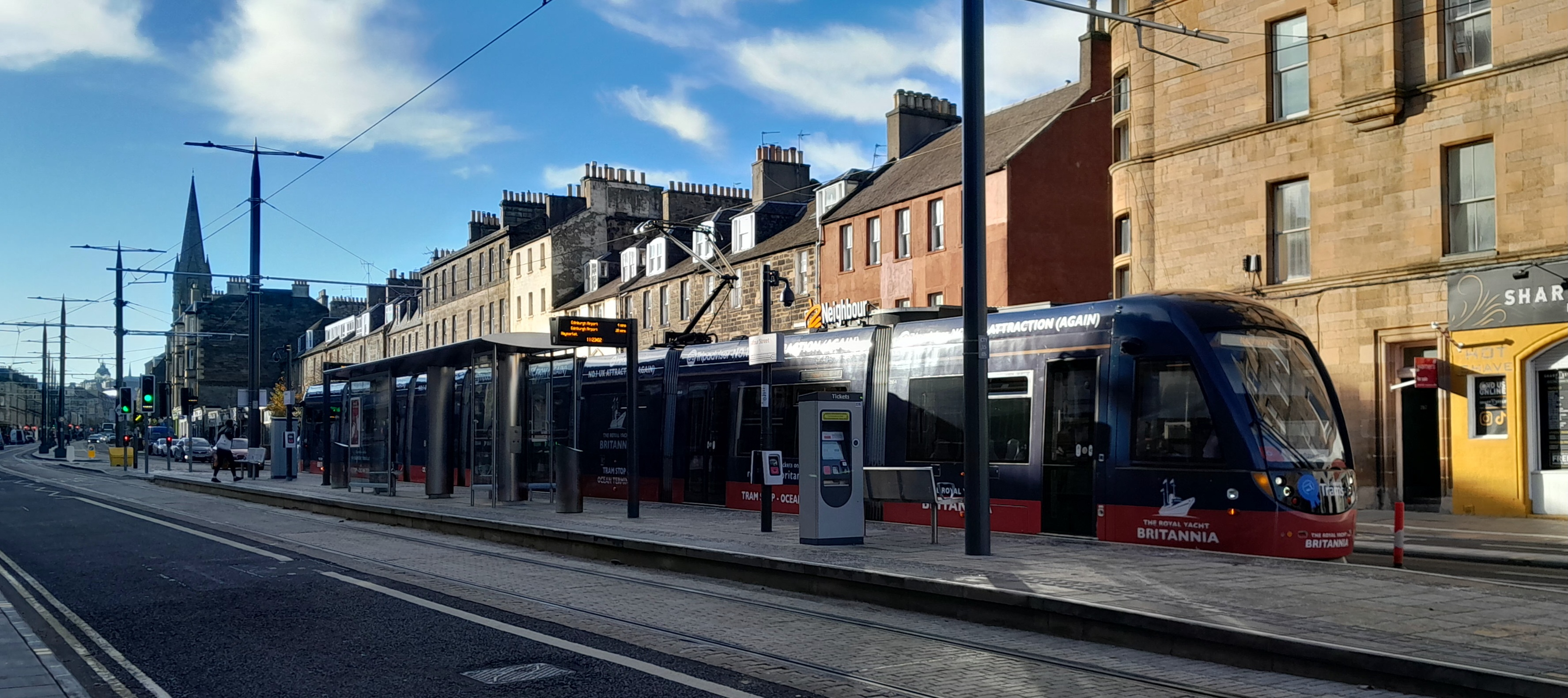
Tram stopping at Balfour Street, Leith Walk

Leith Walk was intended to be part of the Edinburgh Trams light rail route, which opened in 2014. However, this section of the line was scrapped in June 2011 after major delays and cost overruns, with the line terminating at York Place just short of Leith Walk.

In 2019, the Trams to Newhaven extension of the line was re-approved, and opened to passengers on 7 June 2023.

Leith Walk is served by two tram stops:

==== McDonald Road ====
Preceding station	Edinburgh Trams	Following station
Balfour Street towards Newhaven	Newhaven – Edinburgh Airport	Picardy Place towards Airport

==== Balfour Street ====
Preceding station	Edinburgh Trams	Following station
Foot of the Walk towards Newhaven	Newhaven – Edinburgh Airport	McDonald Road towards Airport

The Foot of the Walk tram stop is actually located on the south end of Constitution Street.

== Buildings ==
Before the sudden surge of tenement construction in the 1870s the street was largely rural in character with several nurseries along its length. The separate mansion houses which had been built in the early 19th century were more numerous on the west side than the east. When the tenements were built, it was easier (cheaper) to buy up the few mansions on the east side, which is why the two sides still have different characters to some extent. A large number of tenements were built in a very short time period, between Smiths Place and Brunswick Street, stretching eastwards to Easter Road along Albert, Dalmeny, and other streets. These are all by John Chesser (architect).

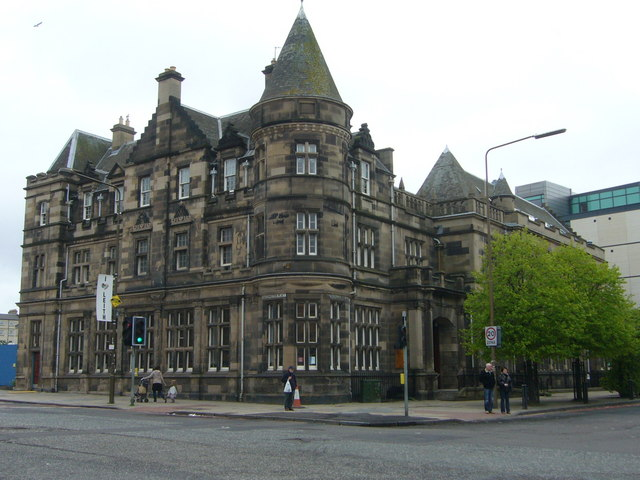
McDonald Road Library, in 2010

The McDonald Road Library is arguably the most architecturally distinguished building on the Walk. Originally a Nelson Hall, funded by its benefactor, the publisher and printer Thomas Nelson, it is now a public library run by the City of Edinburgh Council. It was built in 1902 in a Baronial Renaissance style to designs by H Ramsay Taylor.

Several notable buildings have disappeared in the past half century. The Alhambra Cinema, which stood at the end of Springfield Street, was replaced by a Tyre and Exhaust Centre (now a wine warehouse). This Egyptian style building was originally a theatre. Now it is remembered only in the name of a pub on the opposite side of the street. The Halfway House was a coaching inn at Shrubhill, dating from the 17th century. It survived in truncated form as a pub. At the time of its demolition in 1983 the central horseshoe bar was salvaged and reused in the Shrub Bar/Horseshoe Bar to the north.

The Gardener's Cottage at Haddington Place, dating from 1765, originally served the first Edinburgh Botanic Garden to its rear. It was demolished in 2009 and has been re-assembled in the current Botanic Garden in Inverleith.

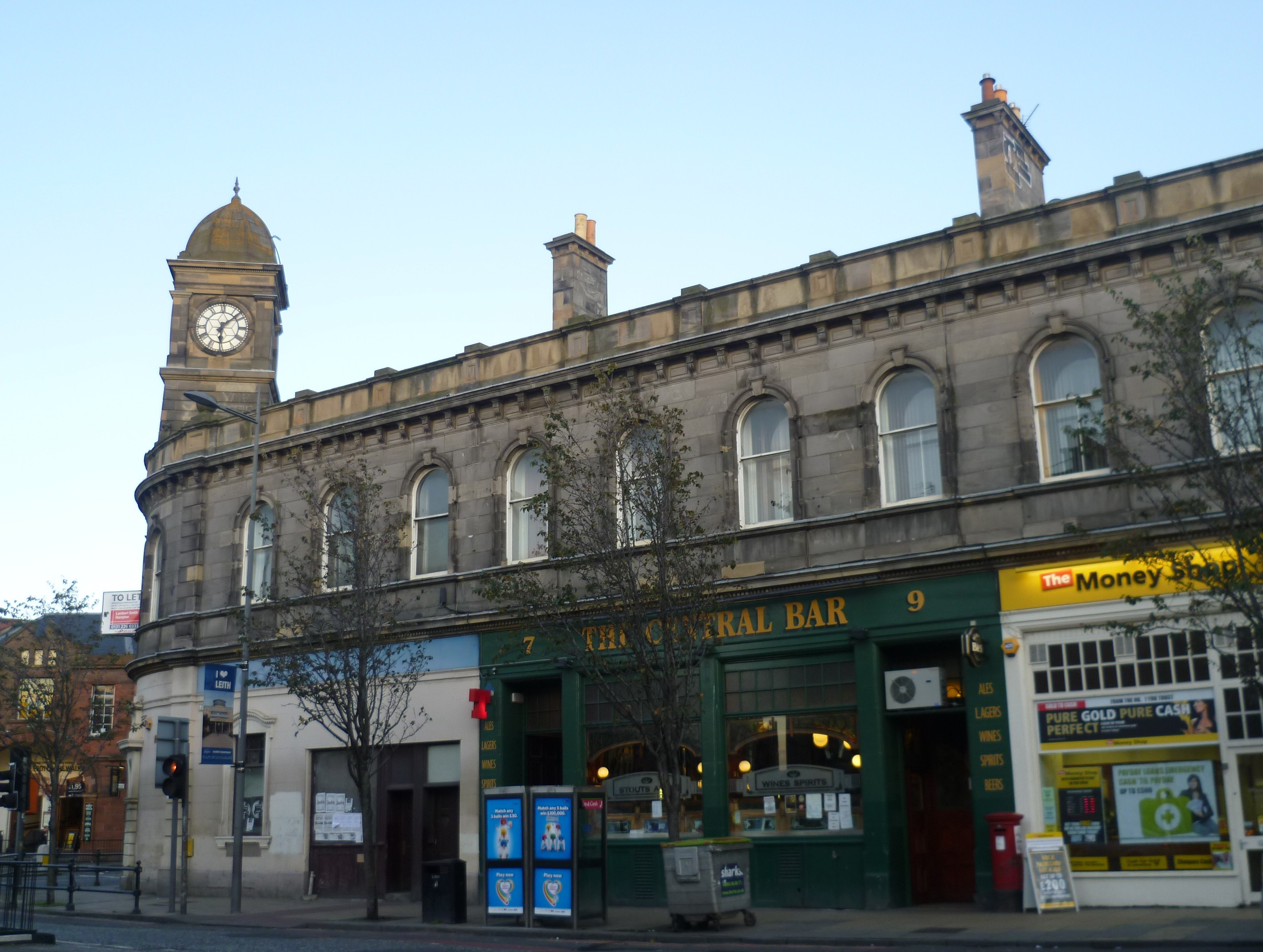
Former Leith Central Station and the Central Bar, in 2011

The main station building of Leith Central Station still stands at the Foot of the Walk. Although the huge columnless railway shed was demolished in the late 1980s, the building which housed the station bars and waiting rooms survives, including the Central Bar which is decorated from floor to ceiling with over 250,000 Staffordshire Potteries tiles with four tiled murals depicting sporting pursuits such as golf, mainly by Minton, Hollins & Co.

The Bier Hoose bar, formerly known as The Boundary Bar and City Limits bar, stands on the old boundary line between Leith and Edinburgh. Prior to 1920, when Leith and Edinburgh merged, it was necessary to use both entrance doors because Leith and Edinburgh magistrates set different licensing rules. The main effect of this was that the bar on the Leith side served until 9.30pm and after that the customers could adjourn to the Edinburgh side to enjoy additional drinking time.

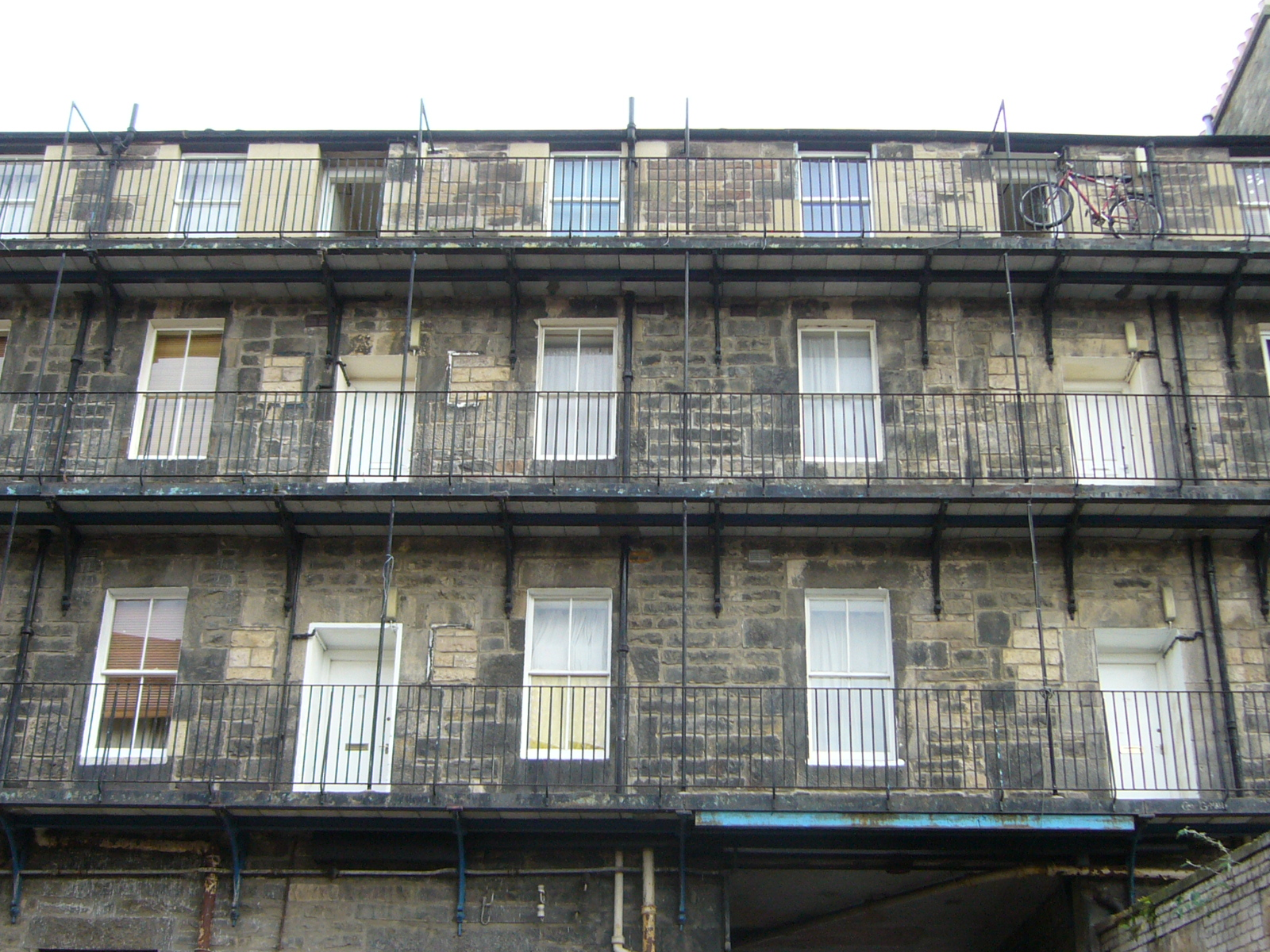
19thC industrial dwellings at the former Victoria India Rubber Mills (rear view)

Pilrig Church (now Pilrig St Paul's Church) is visible along the entire length of Leith Walk. It was designed by architects Peddie and Kinnear and constructed (1861–63) originally for the Free Church of Scotland. It has a fine interior, including early examples of stained glass by Daniel Cottier and a historic organ by Forster and Andrews (1903). The hall to the rear blends in perfectly but is a later addition from 1892

On the upper Elm Row section, midway between Brunswick Street and Montgomery Street, are the remains of what was built as William Williams' New Veterinary College. Only the front building remains, as the complex of stables and support buildings were demolished to create student housing in 2014. The front building was designed in 1872 by William Hamilton Beattie with sculpture by John Rhind. The sculpture was removed and ornate ground floor lost in the 1970s when converted into studio space for Scottish Television's Gateway Studios. The main college structure stood to the rear and contained a fascinating combination ranging from stained glass to stables. The huge rear college complex was demolished in 2014 to make room for student housing.

Other recent losses include the "Craig and Rose" paint and varnish works at Steads Place and Springfield Street, famous suppliers of the red paint used on the Forth Bridge (which was used as their company logo). This site has been redeveloped as housing. Leith Walk terminates (in colloquial terms at least) at the Omni Centre and St James Quarter at its southern end. The lower northern end terminates where Great Junction and Duke streets meet.

== Residents ==
- Grace Cadell (1855–1918), Scotland's first female surgeon. Ran a suffragette refuge at 145 Leith Walk.
- George Coull (1862–1936), Scottish pharmaceutical chemist; lived in the main villa on Smiths Place
- John Crabbie, founder of Crabbie's whisky and Crabbie's Green Ginger, lived at 4 Smiths Place
- Mary Fee, Scottish Labour politician
- F. A. Fitzbayne (1878–1935), creator of Leith's electric tram (1906) lived at 5 Smiths Place
- Alexander Henderson of Press (d.1826) Lord Provost of Edinburgh 1823 to 1825 lived at the mansion at the Old Physic Garden (built over by Haddington Place)
- William Allan of Glen (1788–1868) Lord Provost of Edinburgh 1829 to 1831 lived at Hillside House, demolished to build Elm Row
- McCulloch of Ardwell lived in Springfield House (which gives its name to Springfield Street) and was often visited by Samuel Foote
- Andrew Macdonald (poet) (1757–1790)
- John Smart RSA lived at 13 Annandale Street

== Changes ==
Iona Street was originally called Falshaw Street after Lord Provost James Falshaw, Dalmeny Street was Colston Street and a section of Buchanan Street between them was Cross Street. All three names only lasted from 1876 to 1885.

== Appearance in Film ==
- The 1948 documentary film "Waverley Steps" contains footage of trams on Leith Walk at the Pilrig junction.

== See also ==
- Leith Walk (Edinburgh ward)
