= Bailie =

Civic officer in the local government of Scotland

A bailie or baillie is a civic officer in the local government of Scotland. The position arose in the burghs, where bailies formerly held a post similar to that of an alderman or magistrate (see bailiff). Baillies appointed the high constables in Edinburgh, Leith and Perth. Modern bailies exist in Scottish local councils, and the position being a courtesy title, appointees are often requested to provide support to the lord provost or provost - the ceremonial and civic head of the council - in their various engagements.

== History ==
The name was derived from Old French and used to be synonymous with provost. Several officials held this role often at the appointment of the Church.

The jurisdiction of a bailie is called a bailiary (alt. bailiery).

The office of bailie was abolished in law in Scotland in 1975, and today the position of bailie is a courtesy title.

== Use ==
- Aberdeen City Council - appoints five bailies
- Dundee City Council - appoints five bailies The position was reintroduced in 2003.
- Edinburgh City Council - appoints six bailies The position was reintroduced in the 2000s following the title falling into disuse after the 1975 reform of local government.
- Glasgow City Council - appoints eighteen bailies
- Perth and Kinross Council - appoints five bailies
- Stirling Council - appoints four bailies
- West Dunbartonshire Council - revived the title in 2017 to appoint to veteran councillor Denis Agnew.

== Notable Scottish bailies ==
- Alasdair MacMhaighstir Alasdair, Bailie of Canna
- Mary Barbour, Glasgow Corporation's first woman Baillie (1924–1927)
- Alexander Comyn, Earl of Buchan, Bailie of Inverie, Knoydart
- Dr George Coull FRSE, Bailie of Edinburgh
- Sir John Lauder, 1st Baronet, Bailie of Edinburgh
- Sir James Steel, 1st Baronet (1829–1904), Bailie of Edinburgh from 1888 to 1900
- Thomas Watt, Bailie to the Baron of Cartsburn, grandfather of James Watt
- Bailie William Landale, winner of the silver cup at the first open championship held at St Andrews Old Course in 1754, see Timeline of golf history (1353–1850)
- "Baillie Vass" – the Aberdeen Evening Express accidentally used a picture of Alec Douglas-Home over a caption referring to a baillie called Vass. Private Eye then affected to believe that Home was an imposter.

== Outside of government ==
Scottish barons often appointed a Bailie as their judicial officer.

== See also ==
- Burgess (title)
- Deacon
- Glasgow Bailie, a type of salted herring, which is also sometimes known as a "Glasgow Magistrate"
- Bailie Nicol Jarvie, a brand of whisky named after a fictional character in Sir Walter Scott's novel Rob Roy
