= Lindsay Institute =

Public library in Lanark in Scotland

Coordinates: 55°40′28″N 3°46′53″W

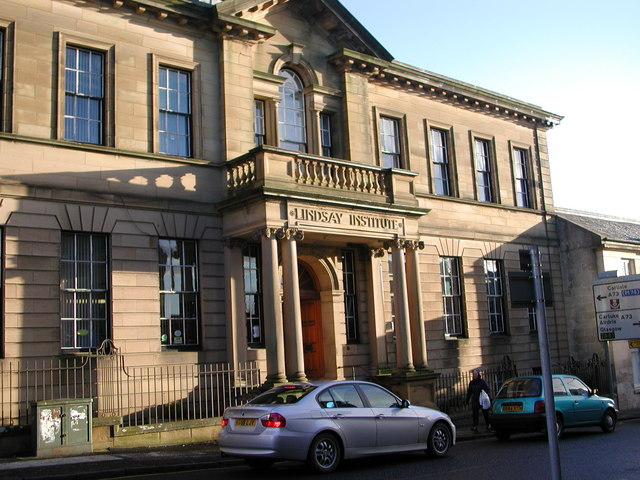
- Alternative names: Lanark Library

General information
- Status: Category B listed building
- Architectural style: Classical
- Address: 16 Hope Street, Lanark, Scotland ML11 7LZ
- Opened: 25 June 1914

Design and construction
- Architect(s): Traill and Stewart

The Lindsay Institute is a Category B listed building in Lanark, Scotland, which was opened by Sheriff Scott Moncrieff on 25 June 1914 with a free reading room, library and museum. The building is still in use today and houses the Lanark Library, which is run by South Lanarkshire Leisure and Culture.

== History ==
The Lindsay Institute is named after its Lanark-born benefactor Charles Lindsay of Ridge Park, Lanark. He gifted the money to the town but it took 30 years before his vision of a library, reading room and museum was realised. He was a man who was keen to provide support for projects which would benefit the people of his home town. The Lindsay Institute was opened on 25 June 1914 by Sheriff Scott Moncrieff. The architects were John Traill and John Stewart of Traill and Stewart. The library is situated on the corner of Hope Street and North Vennel. The building is a classical design and is built of Ashlar stone which came from Denwick Quarry in Northumberland. The toilet in the library retains all its original features except the toilet seat which has been replaced. The building now houses Lanark Library, which is run by South Lanarkshire Leisure and Culture.

== Collections ==
- William Smellie collection of medical text books.
- Extensive local history collection
