= Bailie Nicol Jarvie =

Whisky brand produced by The Glenmorangie Company

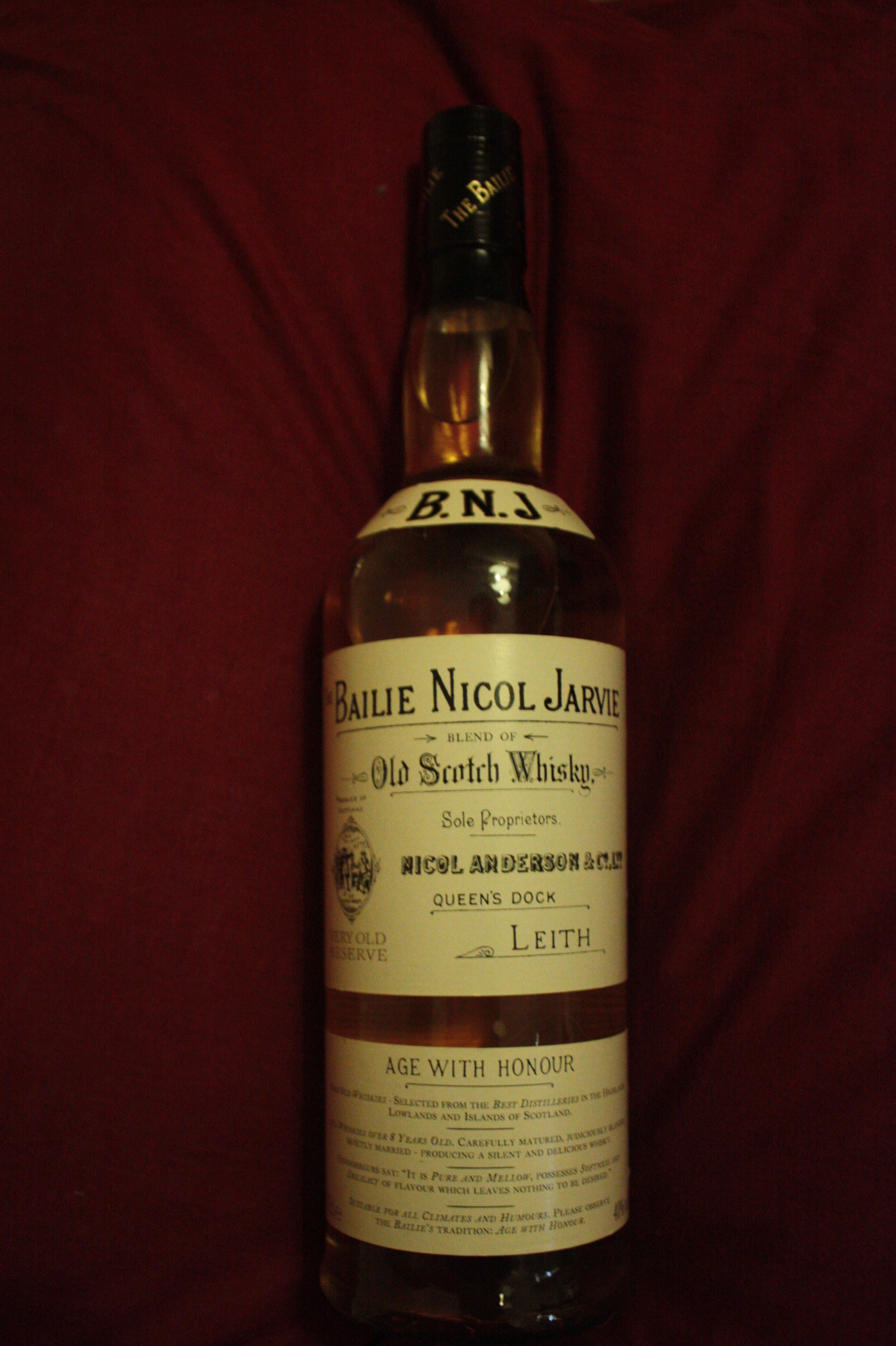
- A bottle of Bailie Nicol Jarvie
- Type: Blended Scotch whisky
- Manufacturer: The Glenmorangie Company
- Origin: Scotland
- Introduced: 1880
- Discontinued: 2014
- Alcohol by volume: 40%

Bailie Nicol Jarvie (colloquially BNJ) was a brand of whisky which was produced by The Glenmorangie Company in Scotland. It was named after a character in Walter Scott's novel Rob Roy.

It is a blended Scotch whisky, which has a good following in Scotland, but is relatively unknown in other parts of the world.

The label claims "The Bailie Nicol Jarvie we believe, boasts the highest malt content of any blended Scotch whisky".

== History ==
The Bailie Nicol Jarvie was first blended by Nicol Anderson & Co, a Glasgow-based whisky company that was acquired by the whisky company Macdonald & Muir of Leith in 1921. The whisky was named after a character in Sir Walter Scott's renowned novel Rob Roy – a bailie (magistrate) who tackled a sword-wielding Highland clansman in an inn at Clachan of Aberfoyle, setting fire to his kilt with a red-hot poker. The blend was particularly popular in the early 20th century.

The brand was relaunched in 1994 by Glenmorangie plc (as Macdonald & Muir had been renamed). The composition of the blend was changed from the original recipe due to market forces. Single malts from the Highlands, Islay and Speyside are blended together with a grain whisky from Ayrshire. In comparison, many blended whiskies contain between 20 and 40 single malts. The minimum maturation time in a cask is eight years and the final BNJ whisky contains 60% single malt and 40% grain whisky. In 2014 Glenmorangie announced it would discontinue BNJ, citing high demand for their malt, all of which is now used for their single malt whiskies. The BNJ has since made a quiet exit from the market and bottles are becoming extremely difficult to find.

The English newspaper The Independent ranked it as one of the "Top 10 Best Scotch Whiskies".

The Bailie Nicol Jarvie was a hotel/public house in Aberfoyle. It has now been turned into flats.
