= Birnam Arts =

Arts centre in Birnam, Scotland

Coordinates: 56.5583°N 3.5776°W

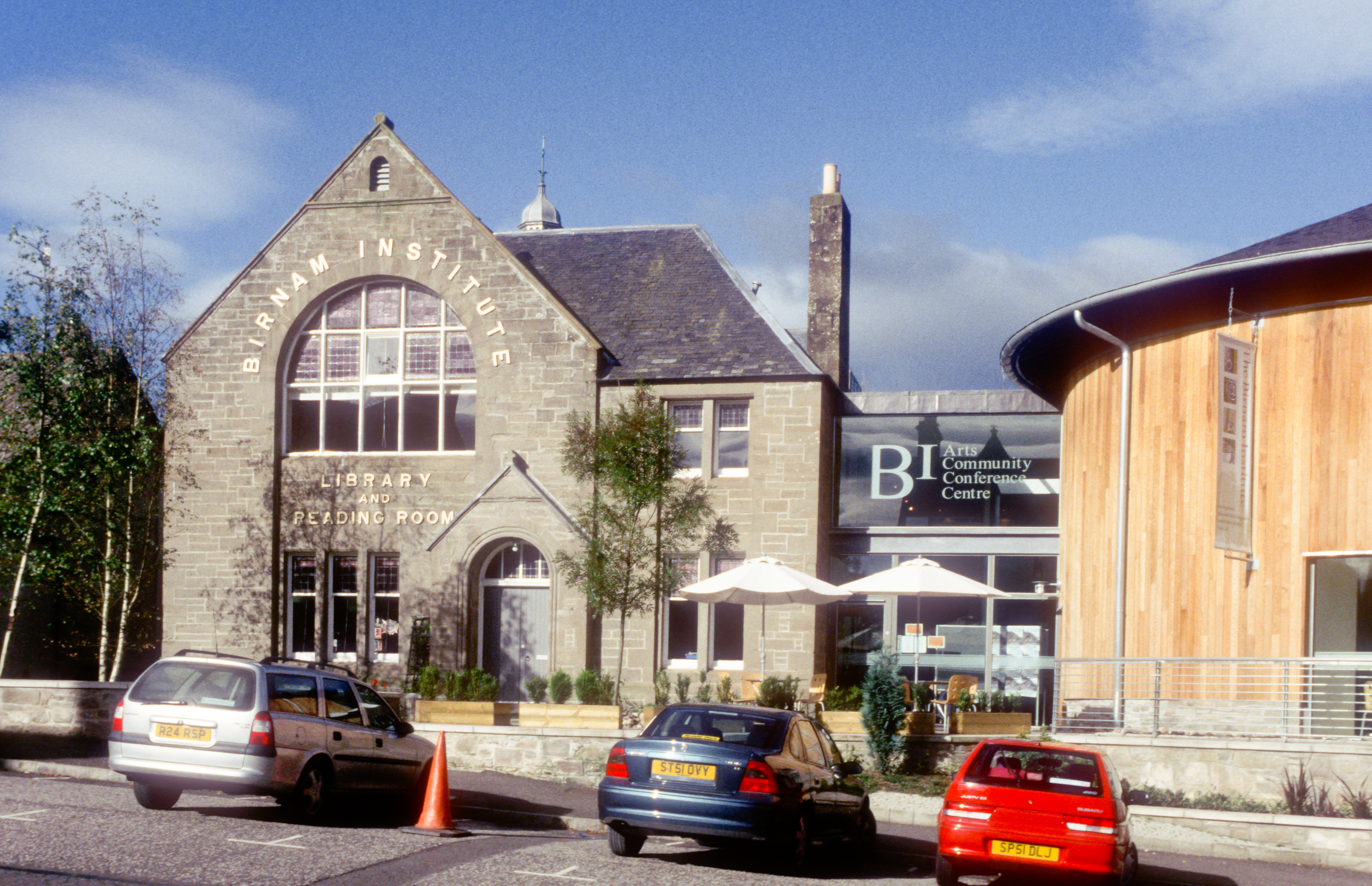
Birnam Institute from Station Road

Birnam Arts is a multipurpose arts centre in Birnam, Perthshire, central Scotland. It is also known as the Birnam Arts and Conference Centre, and was originally named the Birnam Institute. It is a not for profit organisation owned by the community.

== History ==
The Birnam Arts and Conference Centre was developed from 1880, to the plans of John Kinnaird, the village stationmaster, to build a facility for the community. This was the original Birnam Institute which was built and was opened on 29 September 1883. It comprised a library, reading room, hall, a refreshment and games room, and accommodation for the caretaker. In 1890, public baths were added to the facilities that the Institute offered. During both World Wars, the Institute was used by the military for accommodation and entertainment purposes. By the 1990s the Institute no longer met the regulations for a public building, so a plan to redevelop it was created. A major fundraising exercise allowed the building to be renovated and extended. The work was completed in June 2001.

== Today ==
- 170-seat auditorium
- Dance and drama workshop
- Meeting rooms
- Beatrix Potter exhibition and shop
- Foyer Café
- Public Library
- Art Exhibitions
- Community Learning offices
