= Falkirk Public Library =

Public library in Falkirk, Scotland

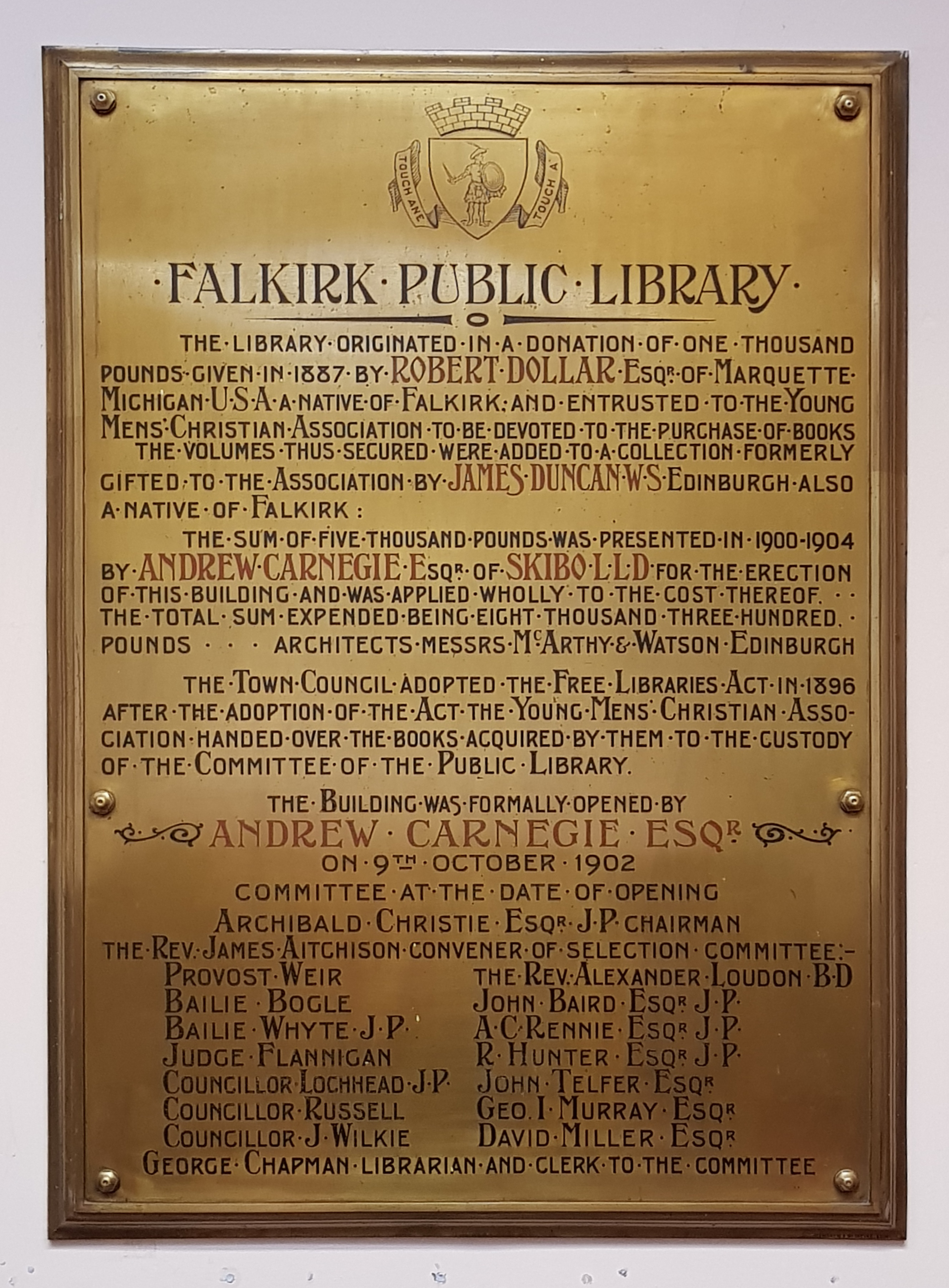
- Falkirk Public Library plaque
- Former names: Dollar Free Library

General information
- Location: Hope Street, Falkirk, FK1 5AU
- Town or city: Falkirk
- Country: United Kingdom
- Coordinates: 56°00′06″N 3°47′18″W
- Opened: 1904

Website
- https://www.falkirkleisureandculture.org/venues/falkirk-library

Falkirk Public Library is a public library in Falkirk, Scotland. It is administered by Falkirk Council.

Local author Alan Bissett credits the library for giving him his passion for writing.

== History ==
In March 1886, Robert Dollar, a wealthy Scots-American industrialist born in Bainsford, Falkirk, wrote to the Falkirk YMCA offering them £5,000 fund a “free library without any charges and open to all denominations” for the local community. In October 1887 the local YMCA asked the public for donations to help further fund the first library in the area. After a successful fundraising the Dollar Free Library opened in Falkirk in June 1888. It loaned over 20,000 books and served more 1,000 patrons in the first nine months.

Falkirk Town Council took over the library in 1896 under the Public Libraries (Scotland) Act and appointed the first librarian, George Chapman. Dollar had already agreed that in the event of the burgh adopting the Free Libraries Act that his library could be transferred to the town and the use of the premises be granted free of charge.

In 1897 philanthropist and businessman Andrew Carnegie pledged £2,500 to build a new library in the town, asking for the public to match his donation to fund the building of the a new premises. The funds were raised by public subscription. The Town Council awarded the design contract to architects McArthy and Watson of Edinburgh. Building work was completed in 1902 when Carnegie visited to officially open the building itself. It would open as a functioning library to the general public in 1904.

In 1993 a £1.5 million extension was completed, which saw the creation of a mostly glass atrium, connecting a new 3-floor wing, to the original building.

== Listed building ==
Because Falkirk Public Library was designed by architects McArthy and Watson in 1901 in the style of 14th century gothic, it became a category B Listed building in 1972.

== Services ==
Falkirk Public Library offers book lending, computer access and courses, a reference library as well as a local and family history collection. The local history collection contains the local newspaper the Falkirk Herald (founded in 1845). Family history resources include local census returns, IGI, church records and monumental and burial inscriptions.

Falkirk Library provides a podcast and blog.
