= McDonald Road Library =

Library in Edinburgh, Scotland

Coordinates: 55.9613°N 3.1814°W

McDonald Road Library is one of 28 freely-accessible public libraries in Edinburgh, Scotland. The library opened in 1904 as the East Branch of the city's library service. It is located on the corner of McDonald Road and Leith Walk, and is a category B listed building.

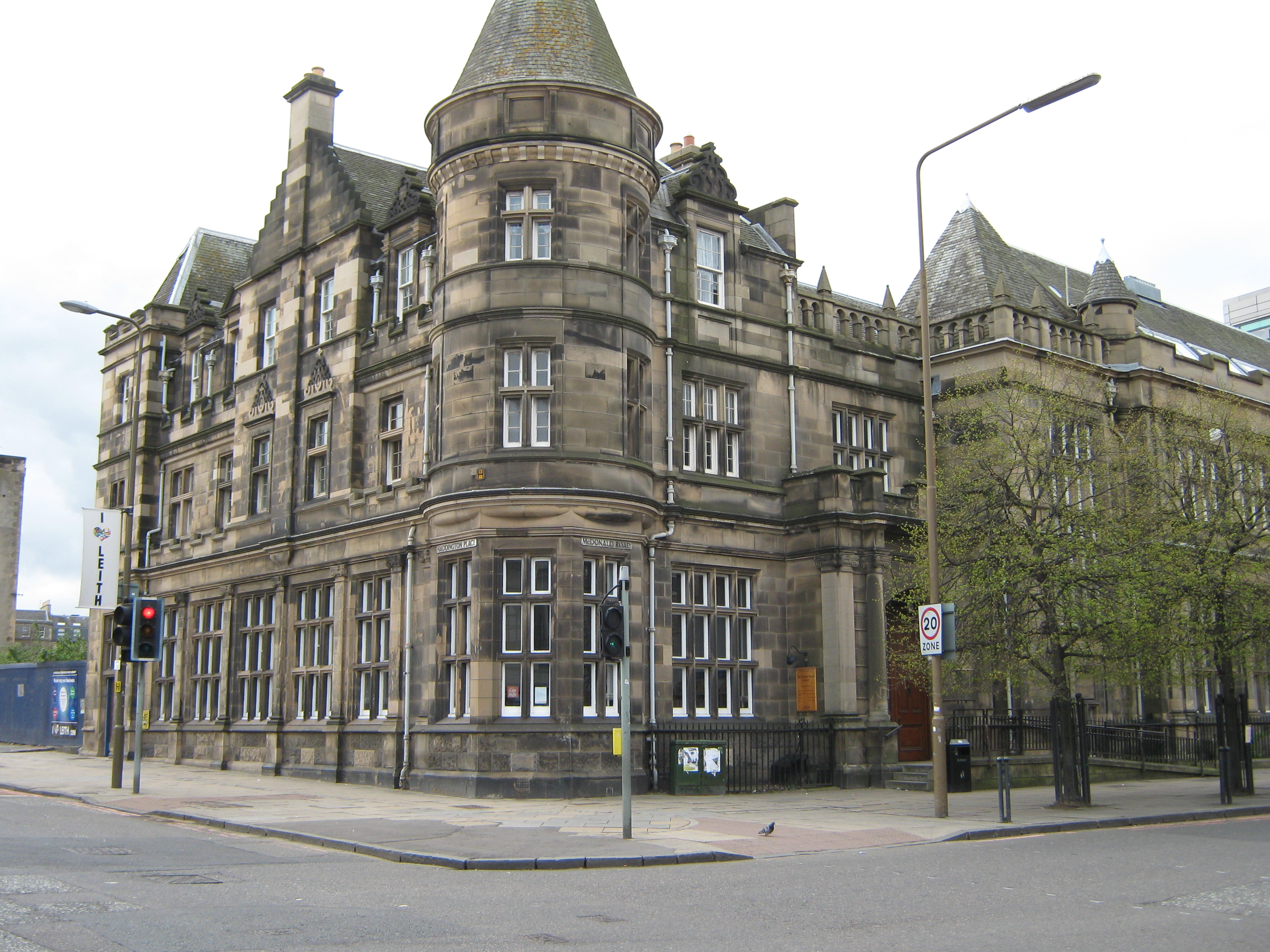
View of the library from Leith Walk, with the building extending along McDonald Road. Above, overlooking the walk are the two flats originally included for housing library staff.

At its opening the library held a stock of 11,498 volumes and recorded in excess of 190,000 issues (loans) per annum during its early years. Books were not directly accessible by the public for browsing until after 1922 when Edinburgh's library service switched to an "open access" approach to their collections. In the year the library opened the then-five public libraries serving the city issued 962,724 loans from stock.

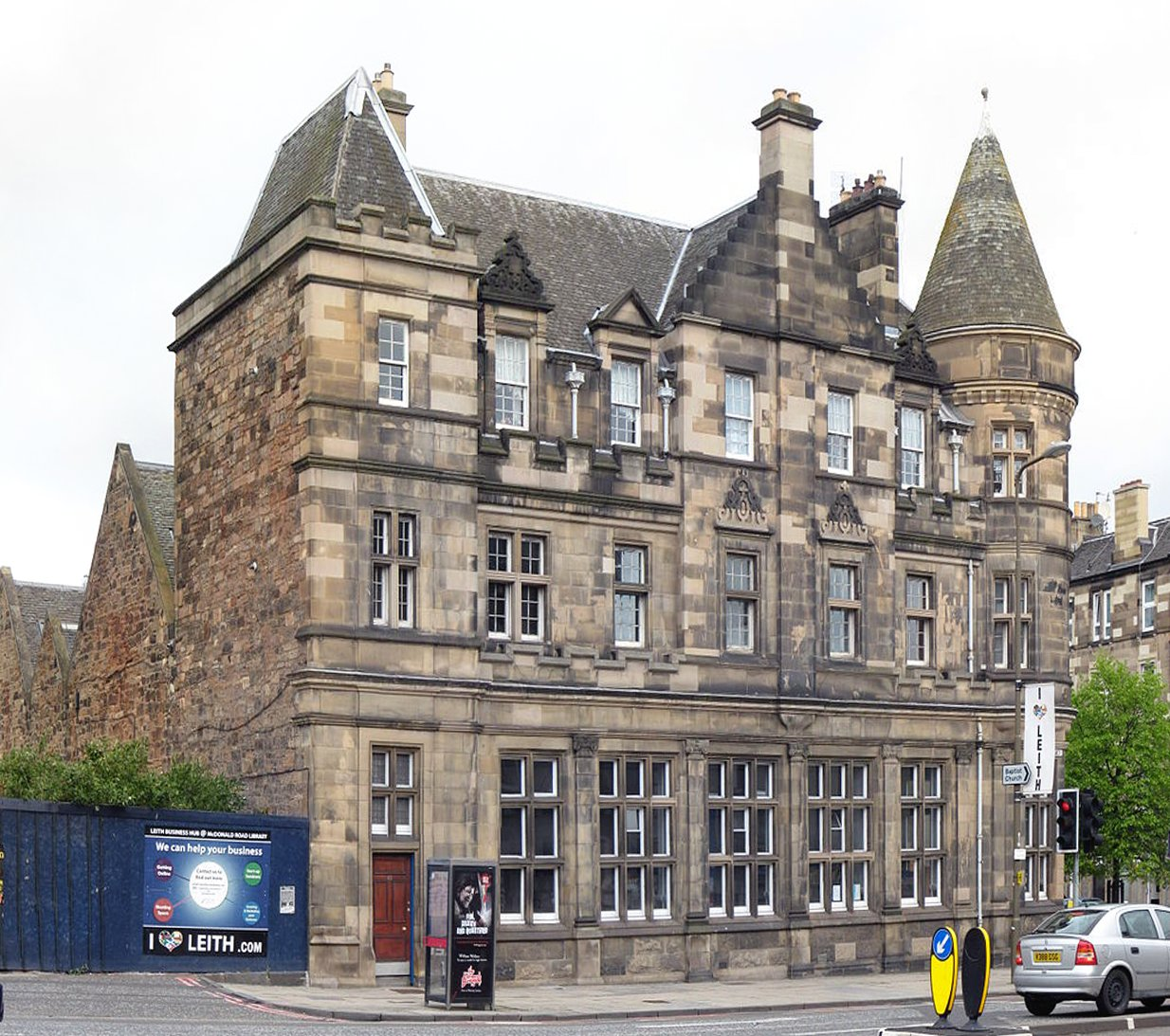
Panorama view from the corner of Leith Walk and Brunswick Street.

The building is one of the original five branch libraries, constructed and opened after Central Library, under the stewardship of Hew Morrison who served as Principal Librarian between 1887 and 1922. The fourth branch library constructed, McDonald Road was built with help from funding provided by the trustees of a bequest from publisher Thomas Nelson to provide "shelter halls" for the working men of the city.

By 1950, the stock of volumes held in the library had more than tripled: 33,963 in the main collection and 6,211 in the junior reading room. Issues from the stock were 285,559 and 57,557 respectively. With the city much expanded, being served by Central Library, thirteen branch libraries, other suburban and deposited libraries, mobile and hospital services, plus books for the blind, the city's community was provided with access to over 650,000 volumes and the combined issues from the service totalled over four million lendings.

As with all public libraries in Edinburgh, adult collections are organised using the Library of Congress Classification system. Since Wigan dropped the system during a 1974 local government reorganisation, Edinburgh is the only municipality in the United Kingdom continuing to use it. Children's books are organised under the more-widespread Dewey Decimal Classification scheme.

McDonald Road branch is open to the public six days a week; with disabled access. It is on nine bus routes, offers free Wi-Fi, public computer access, a business hub, "Bookbug" sessions for pre-school children, five book/reading groups, a children's craft drop-in and some local councillors' surgeries.
