= Montrose Library =

Listed building in Angus, Scotland

Coordinates: 56°42′35″N 2°28′09″W

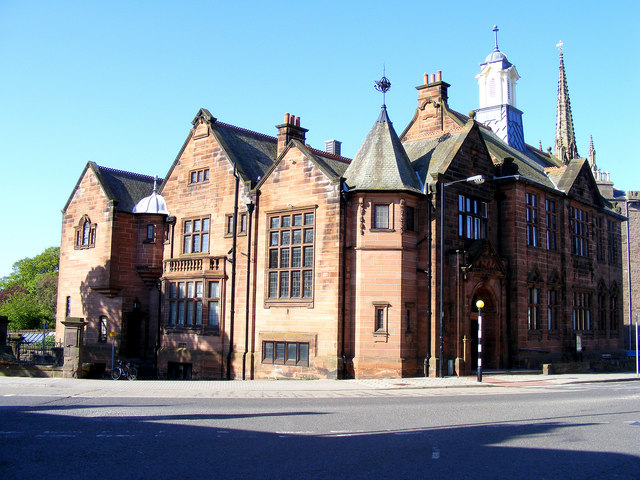
- Interactive map of the Montrose Library area

General information
- Status: Category A listed building
- Location: High Street, Montrose DD10 8PH
- Opened: 19 October 1905

Design and construction
- Architects: J Lindsay Grant, Manchester

The Montrose Library is situated in an A-listed Carnegie funded building in the north Angus coastal town of Montrose. It was first opened in 1905 and in 2018 received a £1 million refurbishment to provide it with "flexible, community focused spaces".

== History ==
In 1901, Scottish philanthropist Dr Andrew Carnegie, responded to a request for funding to provide a public library in Montrose. “I should be very glad indeed to comply with your suggestion and consider it a privilege. If Montrose will adopt the Free Libraries Act and provide a suitable site, I shall be glad to provide money for the building”- Andrew Carnegie.

The architect commissioned was J Lindsay Grant of Manchester. The total cost of the building was £7,500 with further contributions from the town of Montrose of £1000, from Mr and Mrs W. Douglas Johnson of £500 and from “Montrosians at home and abroad” of £1000. Contributions for funding the book collection were requested from present and former Montrosians and local children's families to stock the juvenile section. The library was opened in 1905 by John Morley MP. Montrose Library was the first ‘open-access’ library in Scotland.

== Collections, services and outreach ==
Montrose Library is run by Angus Alive, a charitable trust running culture, sport and leisure in partnership with Angus Council.

== Refurbishment ==
The library was officially reopened on 5 September 2018 by Scottish author Stuart McBride, after a £1 million refurbishment.

== Gallery ==
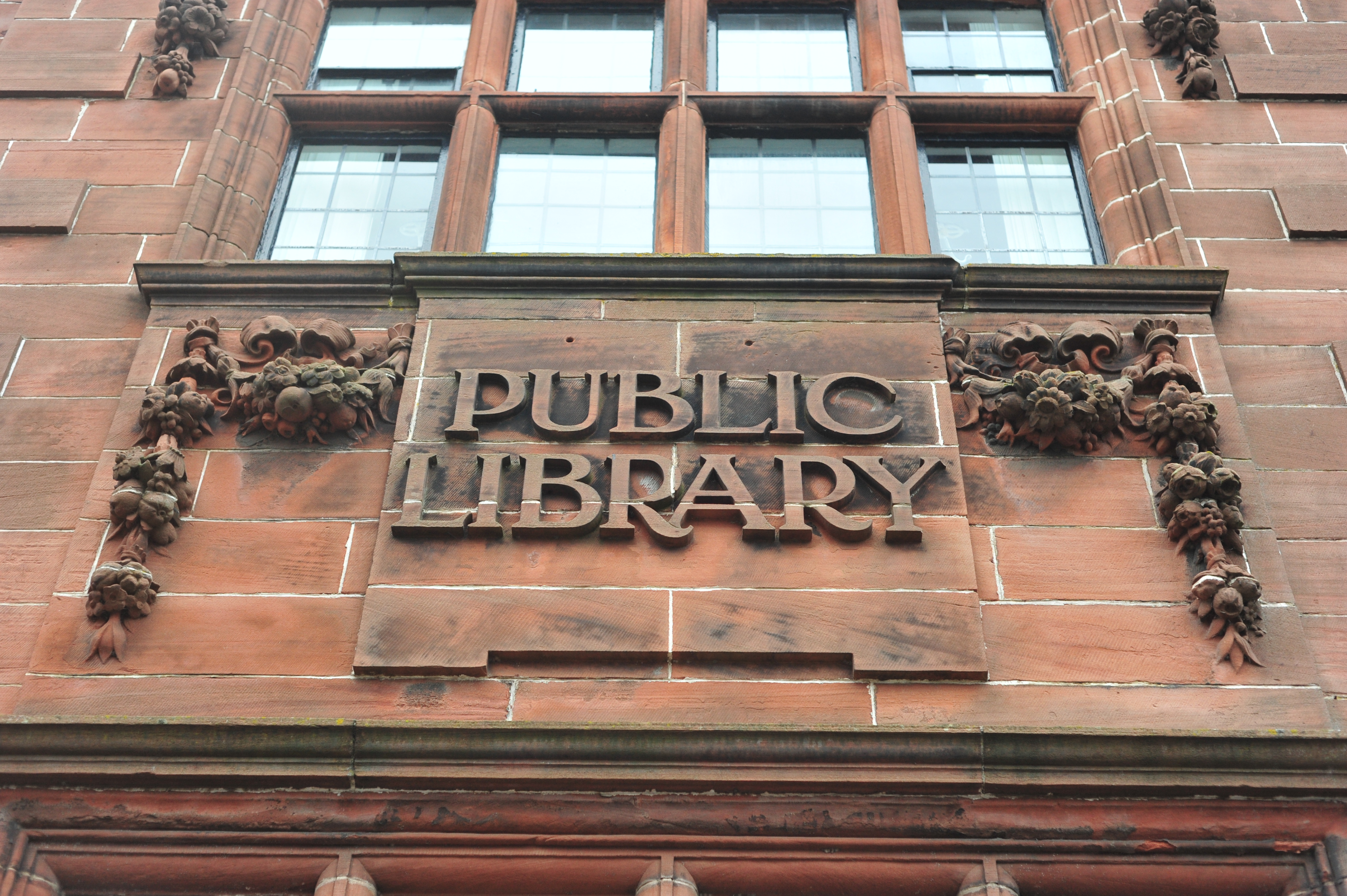

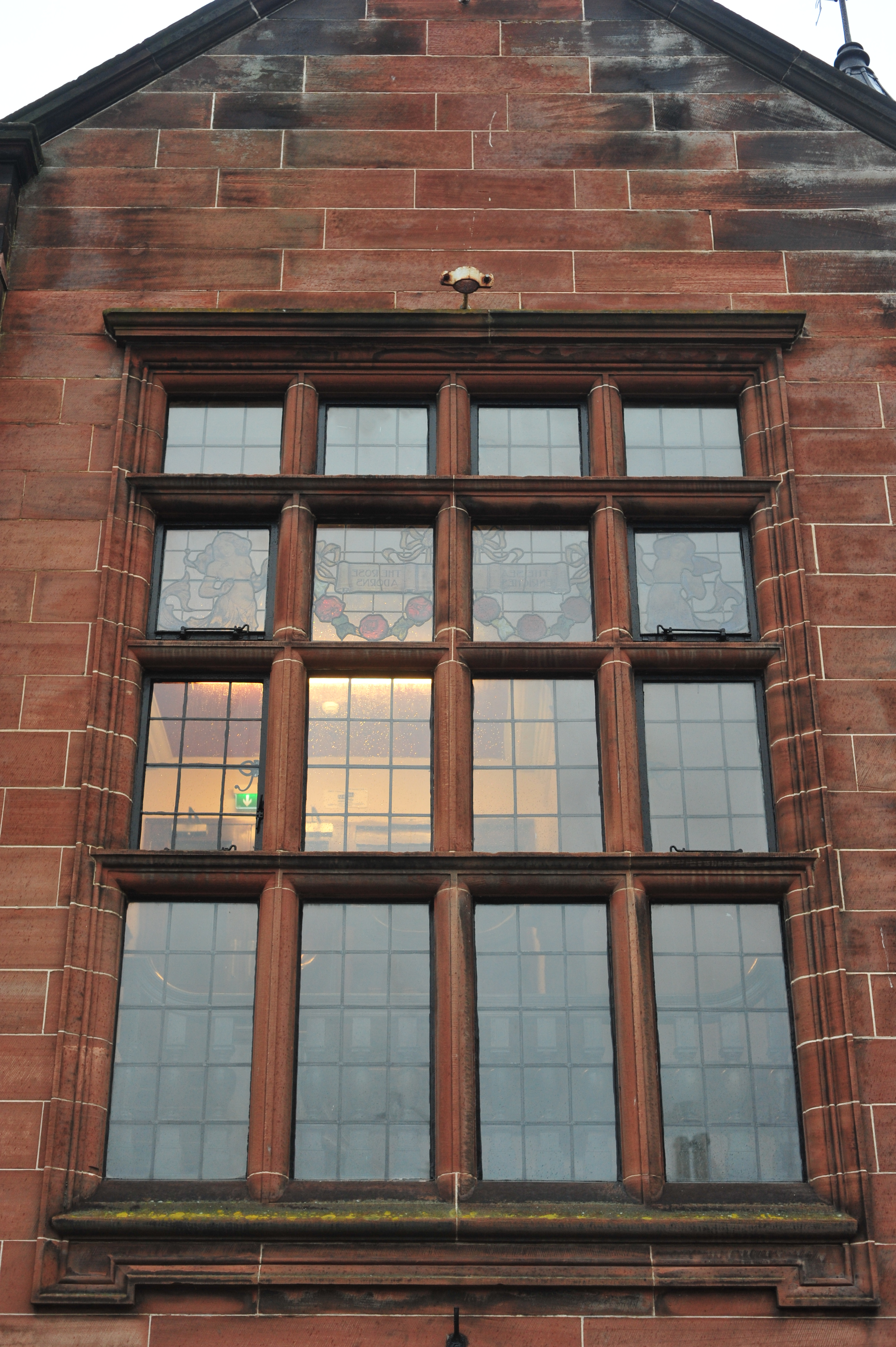

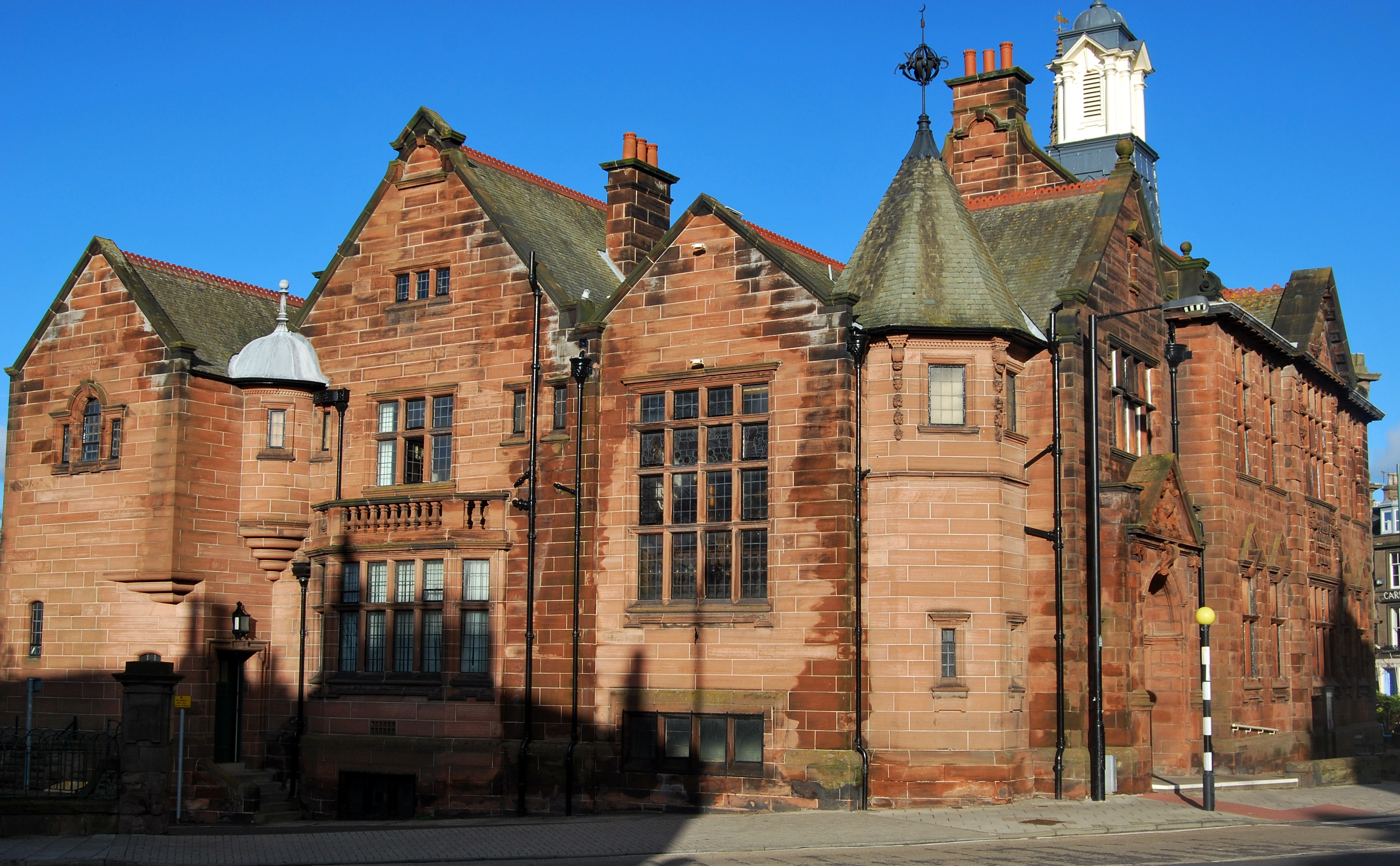

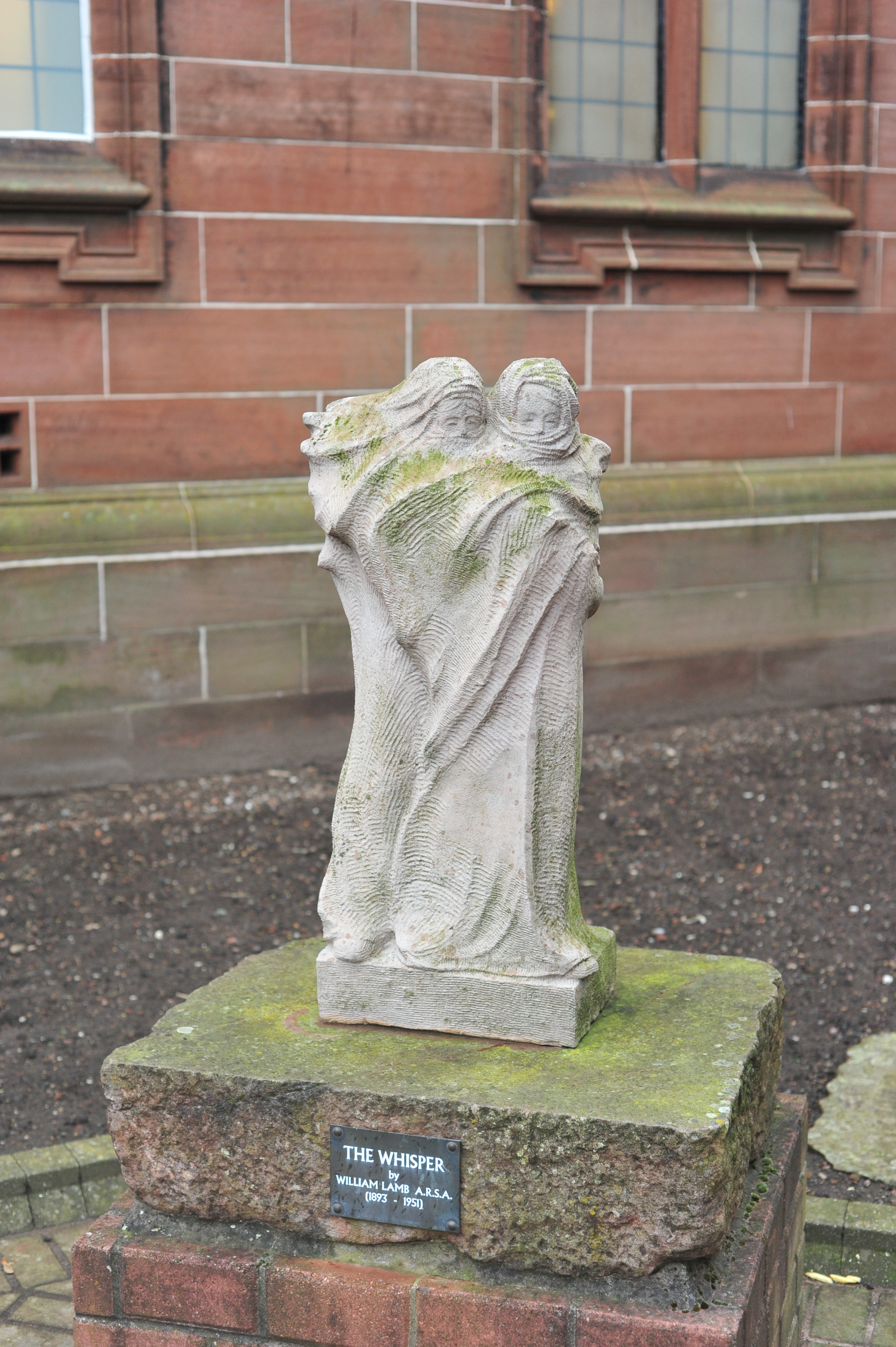

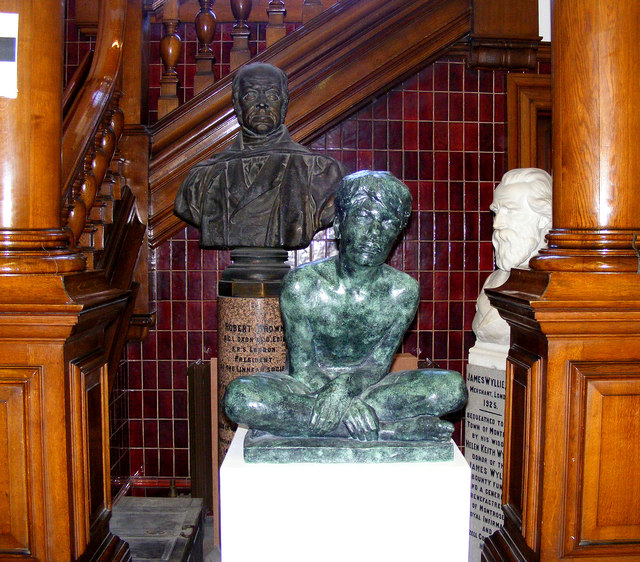

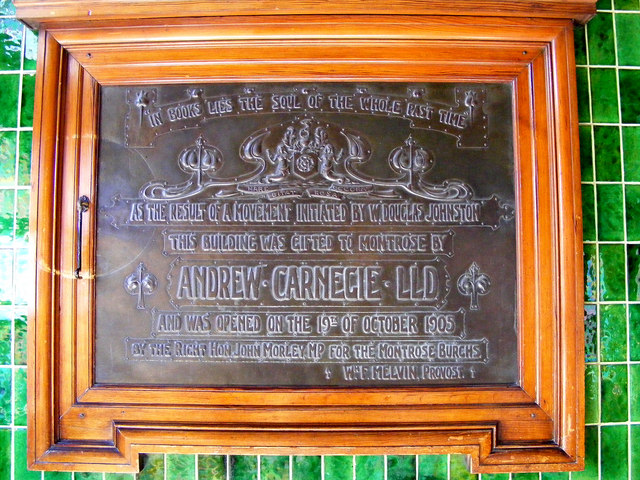
