= Stagecoach in Hull =

Bus operator in Kingston upon Hull, England

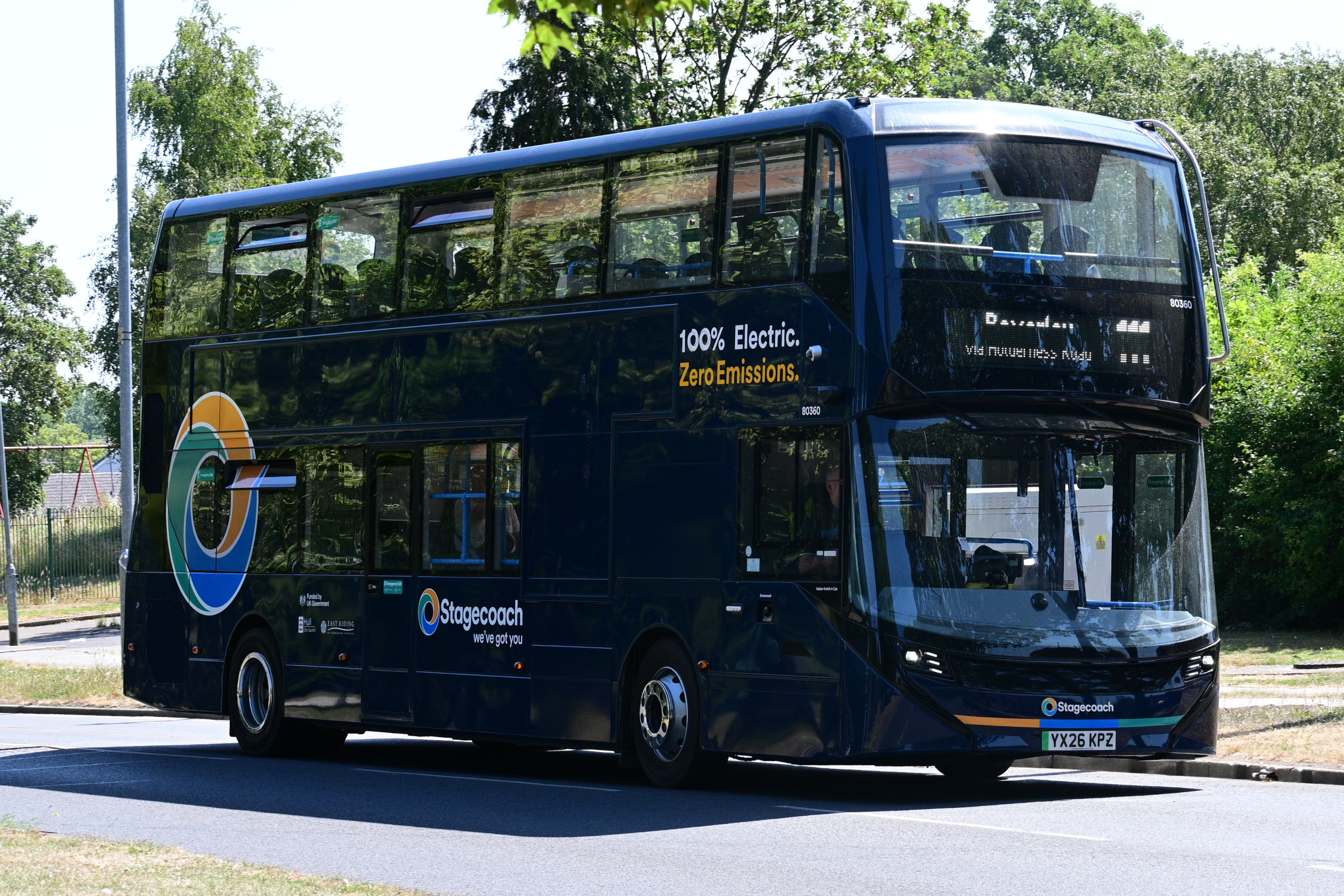
- Alexander Dennis Enviro400EV battery electric bus in Sutton Ings in July 2026
- Parent: Stagecoach Group
- Founded: November 11, 1994; 31 years ago
- Headquarters: Kingston upon Hull
- Service area: Beverley; Bridlington; Cottingham; Hedon; Kingston upon Hull; Wawne
- Service type: Bus services
- Hubs: Hull Paragon Interchange
- Depots: 1
- Fleet: 113 (October 2022)
- Website: Official website

Stagecoach in Hull is a bus operator providing services in Kingston upon Hull, East Riding of Yorkshire, England. It is a subsidiary of Stagecoach East Midlands, a subdivision of the Stagecoach Group.

== History ==
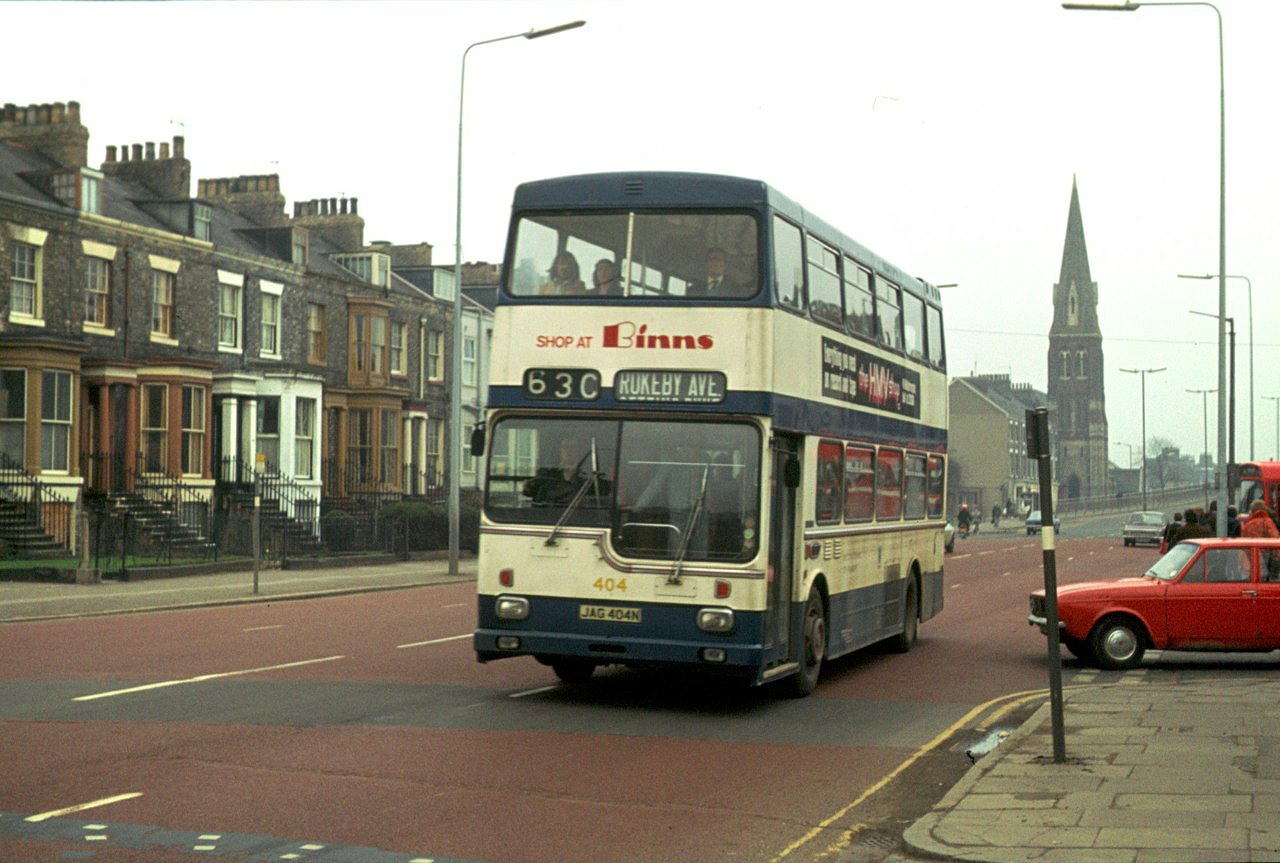
Kingston upon Hull City Transport Scania Metropolitan on Anlaby Road in April 1979

Stagecoach in Hull's origins can be traced back to Hull Corporation Transport, whose tramway operations began in 1899. Motorbus operations began in 1909 with a fleet of six buses, later restarting in 1921 and expanding alongside the city's trolleybus network. The trolleybus network was officially abandoned on 31 October 1964, having been gradually replaced by fleets of Leyland Atlantean motorbuses. Hull Corporation Transport was one of the quickest operators of one-person operated buses, and on 10 November 1972, became the first bus operator in the United Kingdom to fully phase out the use of conductors. Earlier in the same year, Hull Corporation Transport was renamed to Kingston upon Hull City Transport (KHCT), coinciding with the introduction of a new fleet livery and uniform.

To comply with the Transport Act 1985 and ensuing deregulation of the bus industry, on 27 July 1986, Kingston upon Hull City Council transferred the assets of KHCT to a new legal entity, Kingston upon Hull City Transport Ltd. Eventually faced with escalating financial losses and increased 'bus wars' with East Yorkshire Motor Services (EYMS) and local independent bus operators, in December 1993, Kingston upon Hull City Council sold KHCT to Stockton-on-Tees based Cleveland Transit, with KHCT's employees taking a 49% stake in the company.

=== Stagecoach ownership ===
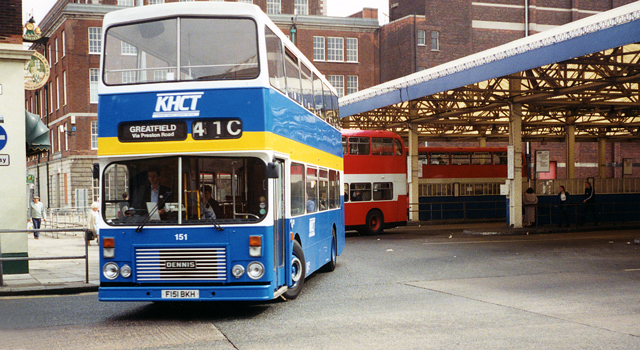
Stagecoach Kingston upon Hull East Lancs E Type bodied Dennis Dominator in Hull bus station in May 1995

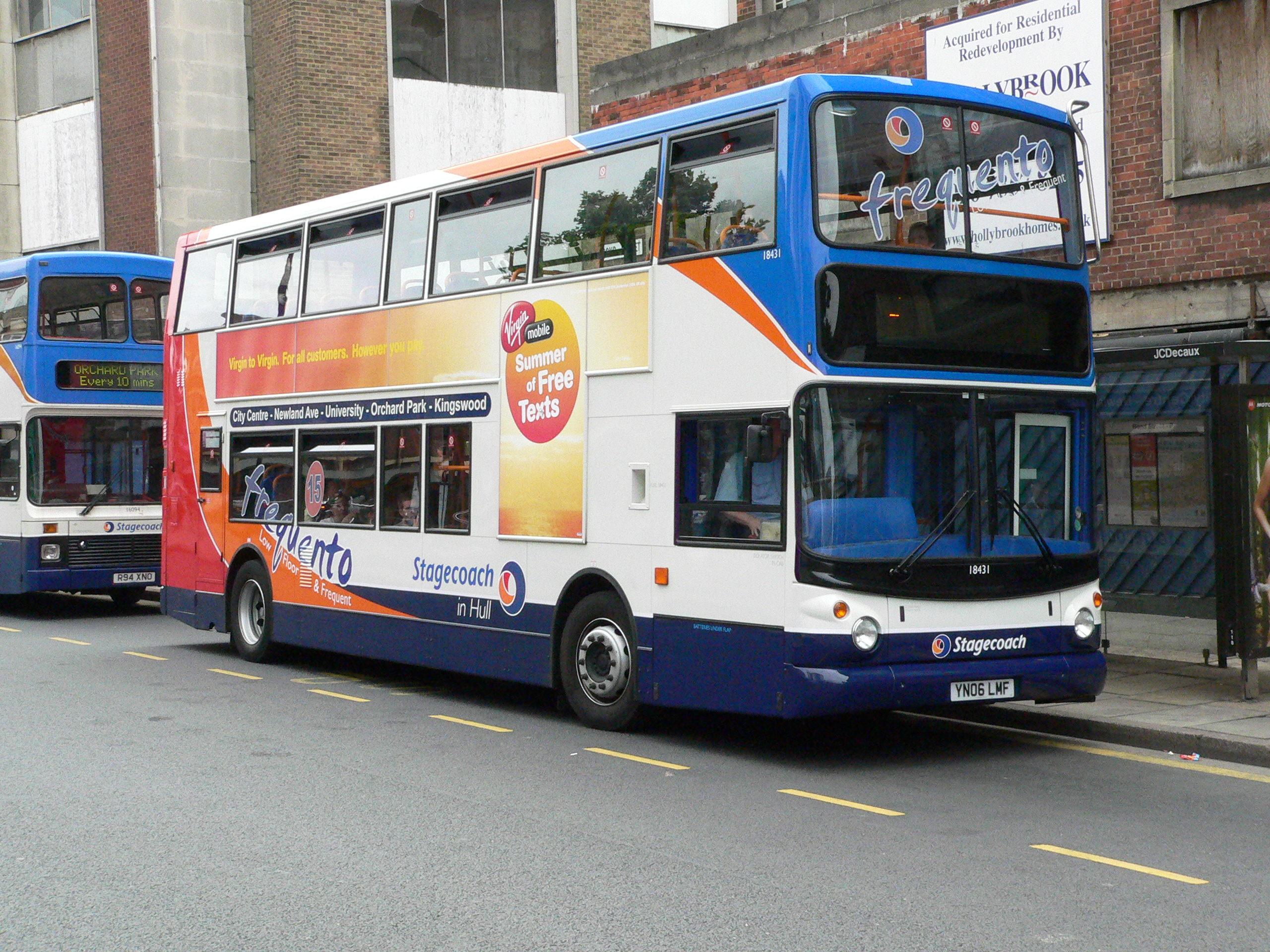
A Frequento branded Stagecoach in Hull Alexander ALX400 bodied Dennis Trident in July 2006

In November 1994, Cleveland Transit and KHCT were sold to Stagecoach Holdings for £7.7 million. The Transit-era KHCT blue and white livery was initially maintained by Stagecoach, however on 1 January 1996, KHCT was formally renamed Stagecoach Kingston upon Hull, later shortened to Stagecoach in Hull, with the Stagecoach corporate livery being introduced by the spring of 1996. Permission was granted by Hull City Council for Stagecoach to move operations from the former KHCT depot on Lombard Street to a new site on Foster Street, Stoneferry in November 1995, which was completed in 1996. KHCT's Kingstonian coaching arm was acquired by EYMS and integrated into its own coaching operations in March 1997.

Stagecoach Kingston upon Hull and twelve other bus companies in Hull were summoned to the Restrictive Practices Court by the Office of Fair Trading in November 1998 after investigations revealed they were taking part in a price fixing and market sharing "cartel" on tendered Hull City Council school bus services. The OFT stated that they had uncovered evidence of representatives of the thirteen companies, including Stagecoach, secretly meeting at a Hull hotel to agree on the minimum prices they would bid to run the services and what services each company would bid for.

In 2006, Stagecoach in Hull was included as part of the reorganisation of Stagecoach operations in the East Midlands and Lincolnshire into an enlarged Stagecoach East Midlands subsidiary. In the same year, Stagecoach in Hull introduced the Frequento network, with routes serving Orchard Park, Bransholme and later Sutton-on-Hull being operated to more frequent timetables using new low-floor buses. The service was initially launched with nine new Dennis Trident Alexander ALX400s. These were later supplemented with 14 Alexander Dennis Enviro300s in 2010 and nine Alexander Dennis Enviro400s in 2011, the latter of which were named after notable Hull people such as William Wilberforce, Philip Larkin and Mick Ronson.

250 workers at Stagecoach in Hull affiliated with Unite the Union entered a period of strike action from 7 October to 7 November 2022 in a pay dispute, disrupting bus services provided for the annual Hull Fair. The strike was scheduled to last until 29 December, however negotiations between Stagecoach management and Unite representatives involving Acas resulted in the strike suspended on 7 November and formally ended on 11 November, with workers receiving a backdated 20% pay rise of up to £13 an hour.

== Services ==
=== Simplibus network ===
Stagecoach in Hull was the second operator in Stagecoach East Midlands to launch a 'Simplibus' network, following the launch of Stagecoach Grimsby-Cleethorpes' network in 2014. The new Hull network saw existing routes renumbered from west to east into a numerical sequence of 1–16, as well as providing new services connecting Orchard Park Estate, Kingswood and East Hull. The new services launched on 6 September 2015 and replaced the previous Frequento network.

The new Simplibus services later resulted in a combined £8.4 million investment in a fleet of new buses over three years, with Stagecoach in Hull receiving 46 new Alexander Dennis Enviro400 MMC double-decker buses and Alexander Dennis Enviro200 MMC single-decker buses between 2016 and 2019, all delivered new with Simplibus branding.

=== Council tenders ===
Stagecoach in Hull first took on the Priory Park Park and Ride services as a commercial operation from CT Plus in September 2014, following a retendering process by Hull City Council. The company invested in five single deckers, three of which were given blue route-branding for the service, with the aim of improving bus services for the 2017 City of Culture events. Stagecoach announced it was to withdraw from operating peak time services on the park and ride in June 2023 due to low passenger numbers and high operating costs, however a deal was agreed in September 2023 for Stagecoach to continue running the service until March 2025, with the park and ride's operations being reduced to operating between 6:00 a.m. to 9:30 a.m. and 2:30 p.m to 7:00 p.m. on weekdays only and bus frequency moving from every 20 minutes to 30 minutes.

Retendering by the East Riding of Yorkshire Council in 2019 saw Stagecoach in Hull gain the contract to operate a seasonal park and ride service in Bridlington from East Yorkshire, also launching a bus service operating from Hull to Bridlington three times a day. Stagecoach later gained Hull City Council bus service contracts from East Yorkshire in 2021, being awarded funding to run both an East Hull supermarket shuttle and services connecting two West Hull estates.

== Fleet ==
As of October 2022, Stagecoach in Hull operated a fleet of 113 buses, mainly manufactured by Alexander Dennis. Two rounds of funding awarded jointly to Hull City Council and East Riding of Yorkshire Council through the central government's Zero Emission Bus Regional Areas 2 (ZEBRA2) fund saw Stagecoach in Hull take delivery of 32 Alexander Dennis Enviro400EVs and 10 Yutong E10 battery electric buses in summer 2026, with Stagecoach's Foster Street depot seeing the installation of 56 charging points to support the new fleet.
