= Arriva North East =

British bus operator

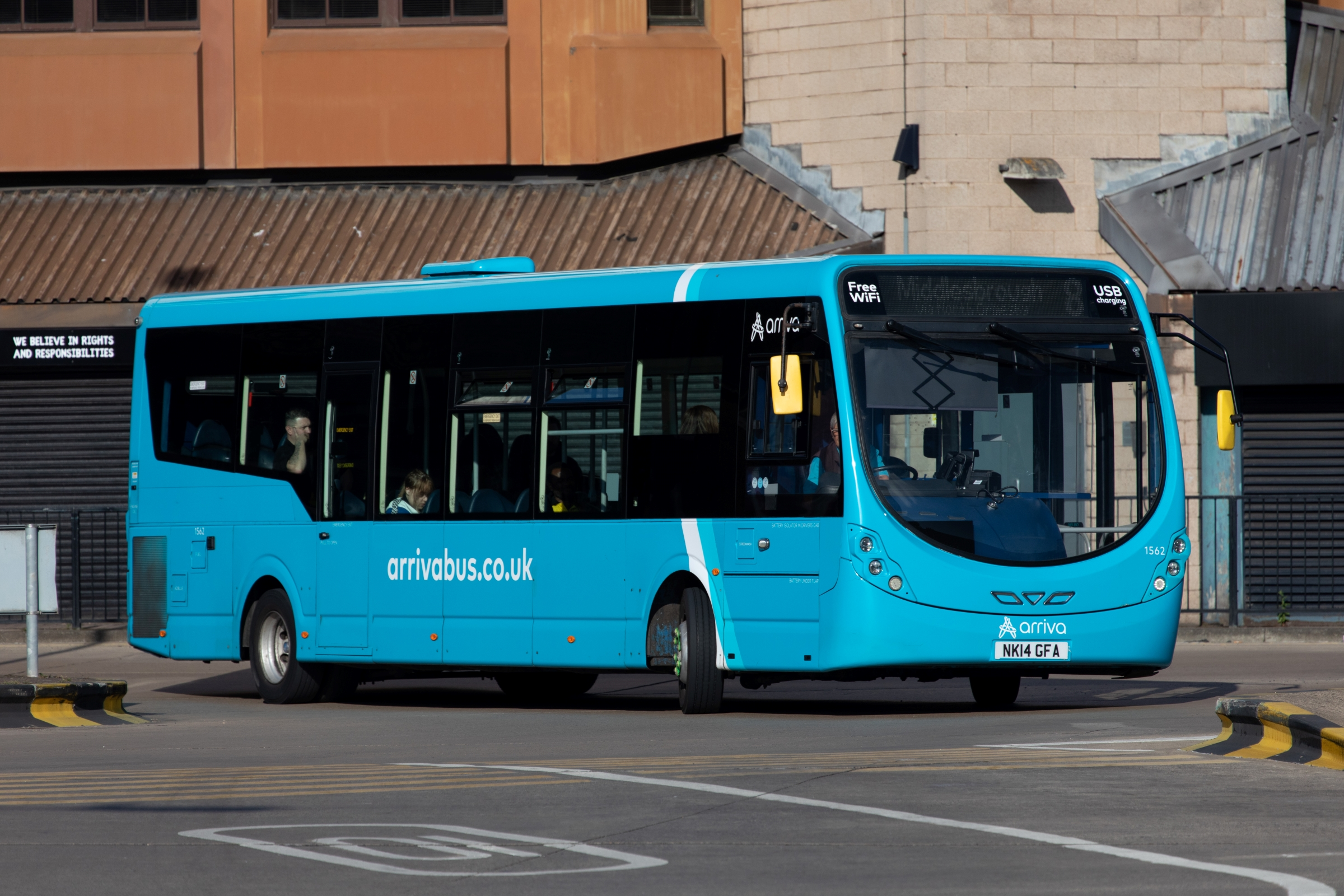
- Parent: Arriva UK Bus
- Headquarters: Sunderland, Tyne and Wear; England
- Service area: County Durham; Northumberland; North Yorkshire; Tyne and Wear
- Service type: Bus and coach
- Depots: 6
- Managing Director: Nick Knox
- Website: www.arrivabus.co.uk/north-east/

Arriva North East operates both local and regional bus services in County Durham, Northumberland, North Yorkshire and Tyne and Wear, England. It is a subsidiary of Arriva UK Bus, which operates bus and coach services across the United Kingdom.

== History ==
In 1986, as part of the privatisation of the National Bus Company, United Automobile Services was split in two. Operations north of the River Tyne were sold in a management buyout to Proudmutual, with the company becoming Northumbria Motor Services. In 1994, it was then sold to British Bus.

Operations in County Durham and North Yorkshire were sold to Caldaire Holdings in a management buyout. In September 1992, the company was subsequently sold to Westcourt Bus Group, followed by National Express.

In 1995, West Auckland-based Eden Bus Company was purchased by North East Bus. The depot was subsequently closed, with operations being moved to Bishop Auckland depot. The name was later purchased by Graeme Scarlett, who now operates a small fleet in and around Bishop Auckland, with vehicles branded in a red and ivory livery.

Following the Cowie Group purchasing British Bus in August 1996, both were once again under common ownership, although North East Bus and Northumbria Motor Services continued to operate as separate entities. In November 1997, Cowie Group was rebranded as Arriva, consolidating 140 sub-brands under one name. Operations in the region were subsequently integrated, with common fleet numbering and management.

In March 2006, Go North East announced the withdrawal of services in Bishop Auckland, with remaining services transferred to their Chester-le-Street depot. Operations, which had previously been taken over from OK Travel by Go-Ahead Northern in March 1995, were transferred to Arriva. The former depot has since been demolished. In the same month, Richmond depot was closed, with staff and operations transferred to Darlington. Most North Yorkshire County Council-supported services, along with some of the depot's former staff, were taken on by Dales & District.

In May 2007, it was announced that the company would take over Stagecoach's operations in Darlington, pending approval by the Office of Fair Trading. Following the takeover, services, as well as 28 vehicles and 78 drivers (with no changes to pay or conditions) were transferred, with vehicles subsequently repainted. In March 2008, operations moved to a new depot at Faverdale Industrial Estate, Darlington.

The Loftus depot was closed in January 2009, after over 80 years of continuous operation, with the subsequent loss of 20 jobs. Operations, along with in the region of 60 staff, were transferred between Redcar, Stockton-on-Tees and Whitby depots.

In March 2010, Go North East's Ashington depot was exchanged with Arriva's Hexham depot.

In December 2012, Durham's Waddington Street depot was closed, following the completion of the new Belmont depot, (despite being only one minute away from Durham Bus Station). By July 2013, the former depot had been demolished, with the site being redeveloped for residential use.

In March 2013, a fleet of 11 gas-powered MAN Ecocity were introduced on services 2, 11 and 12 in Darlington – an investment totalling £2.2 million.

In March 2014, the buses and employees of the Ashington depot on Lintonville Terrace transferred to a new site on Lintonville Parkway, a short distance from the original depot. Staff rest facilities and operational staff remained at the former depot until November 2014, before being moved into temporary facilities nearby. In August 2015, the Lintonville Terrace depot was demolished.

In October 2022, the company's Jesmond depot was closed, with most staff and vehicles transferred to other depots in the region.

In August 2026, the Redcar depot in Dormanstown was closed, following years of financial underperformance. Vehicles and staff were transferred to the Stockton and Whitby depots.

== Fleet and operations ==
=== Depots ===
As of September 2026, the company operates from six depots across the region: (Note: An outstation of Ashington depot, based at Rothbury Motors' depot, Lionheart Enterprise Park.) Ashington, Blyth, Darlington (Faverdale), Durham (Belmont), Stockton-on-Tees and Whitby. (Note: An outstation of Redcar depot.)

=== Vehicles ===
The fleet consists mainly of diesel-powered single and double-deck buses manufactured by Alexander Dennis and Wrightbus.

== Branding ==
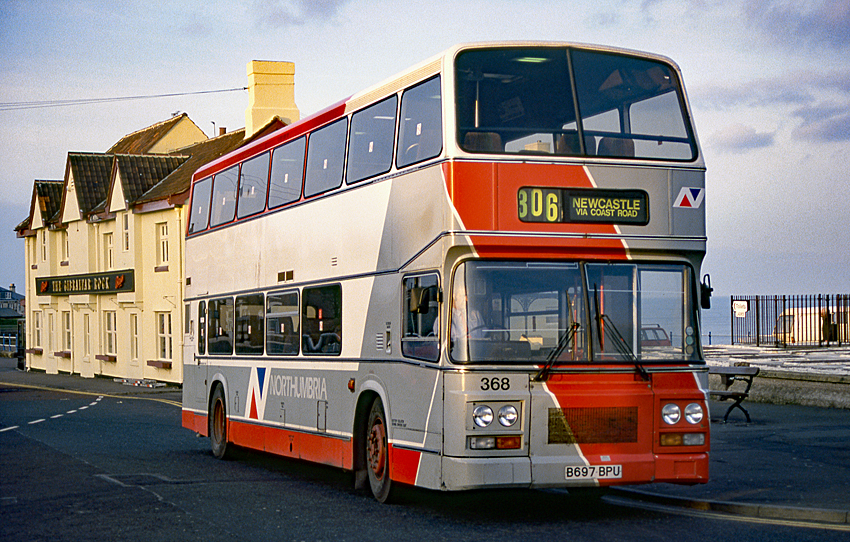
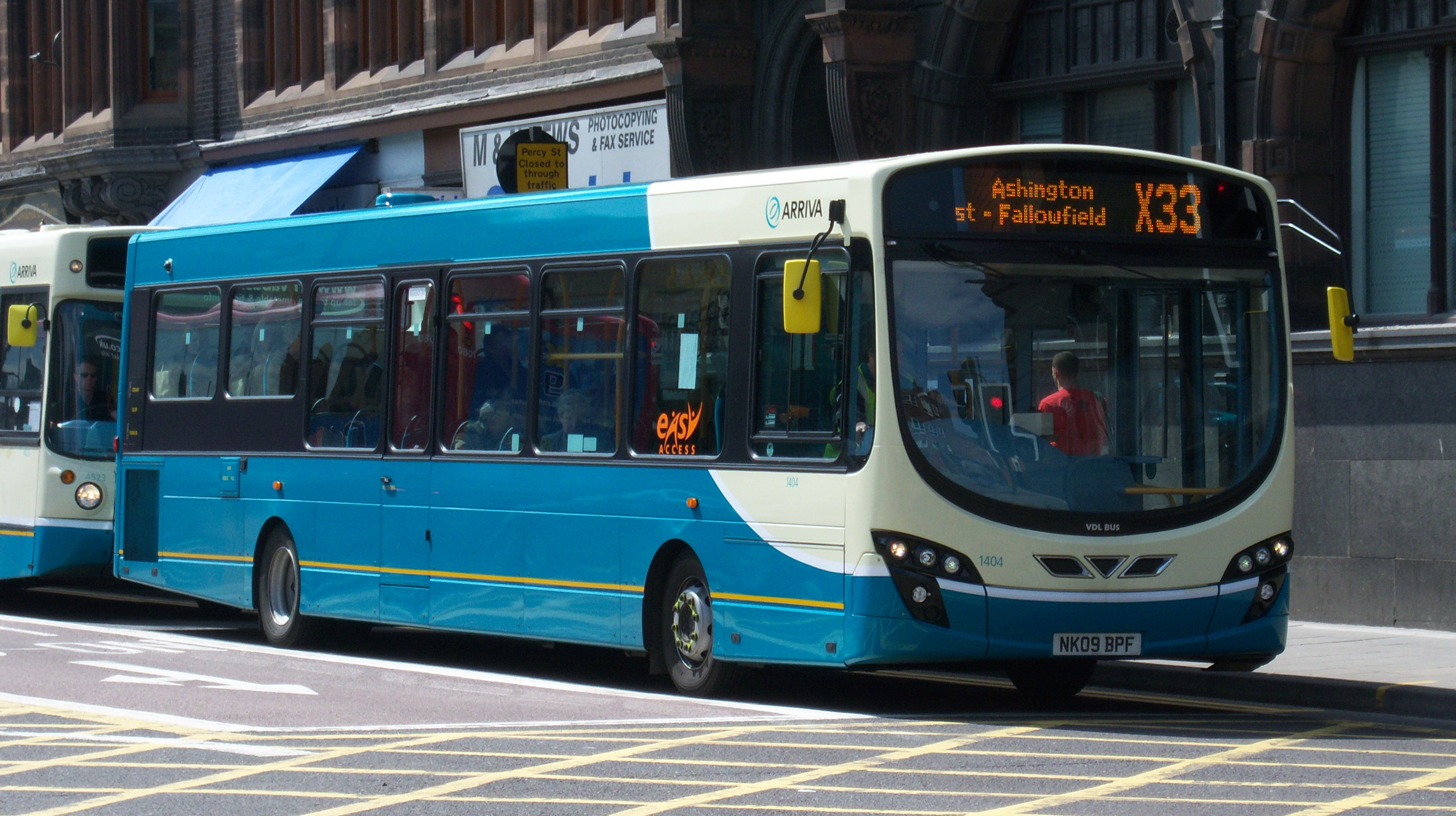
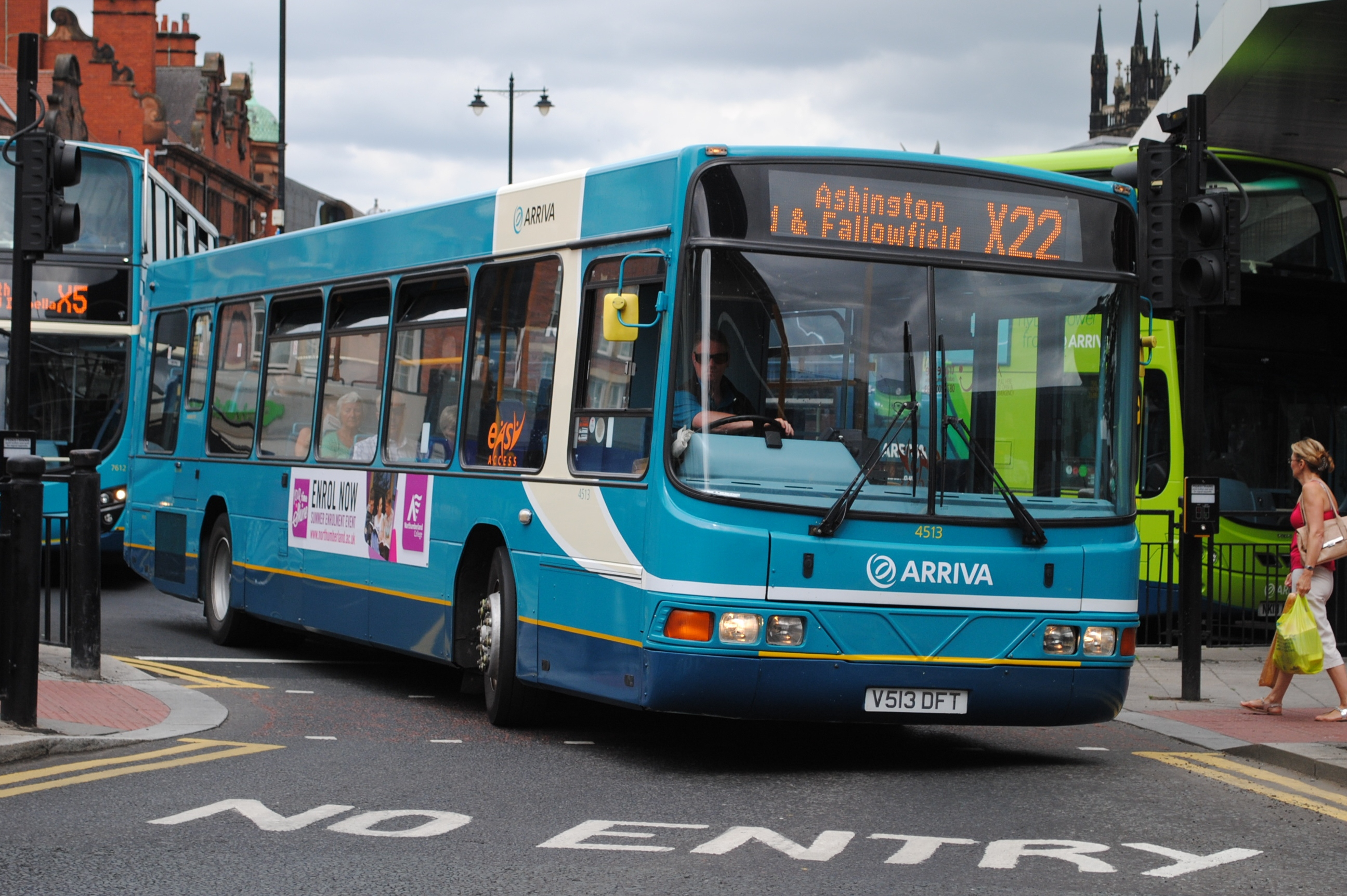
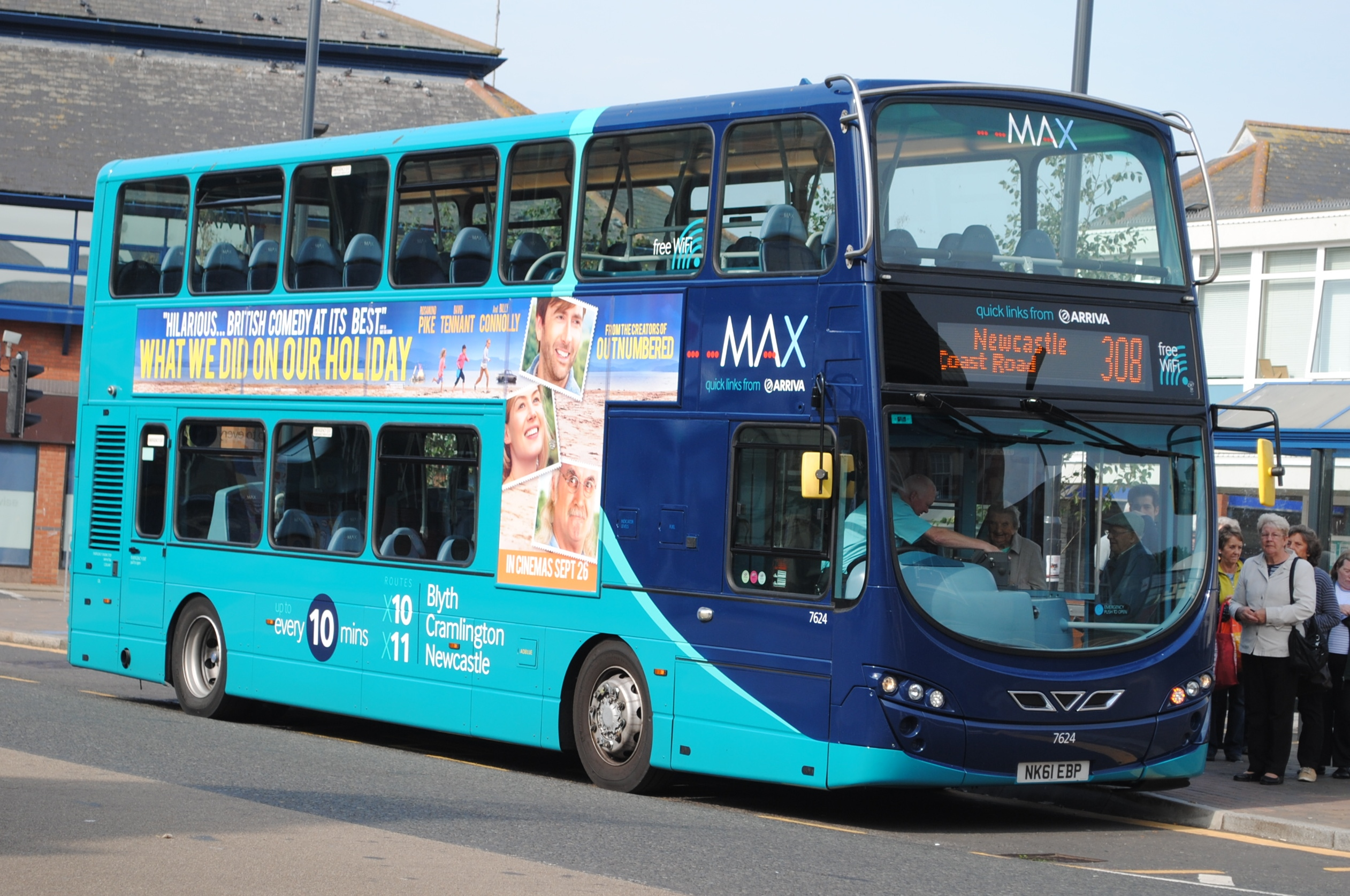
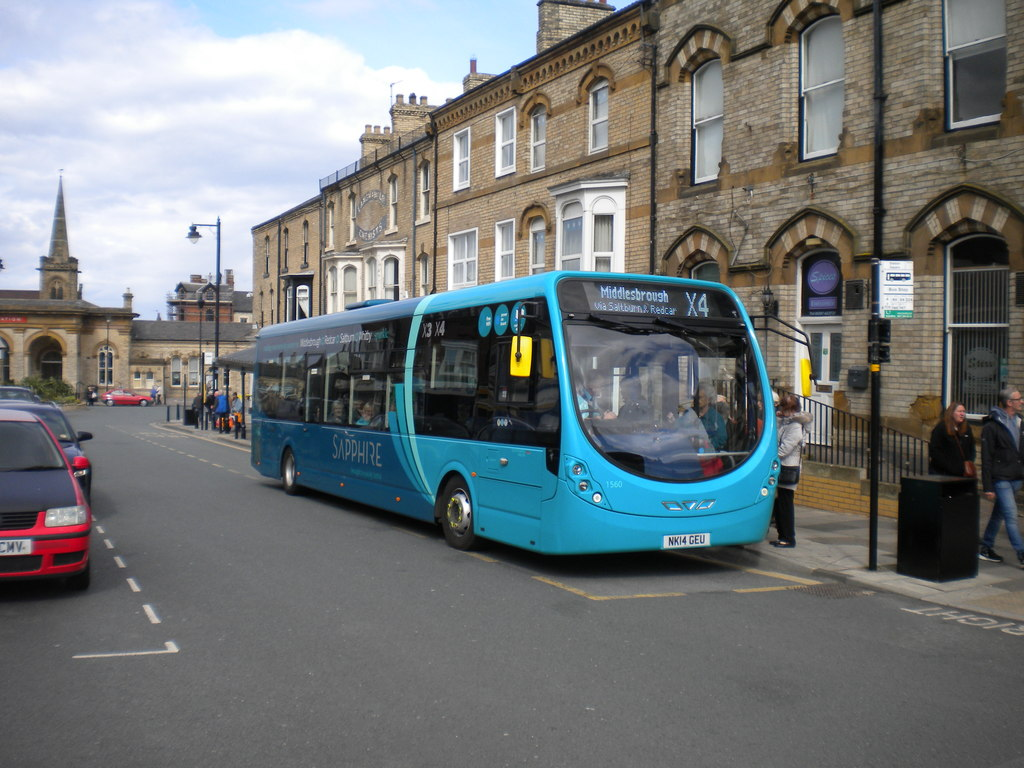
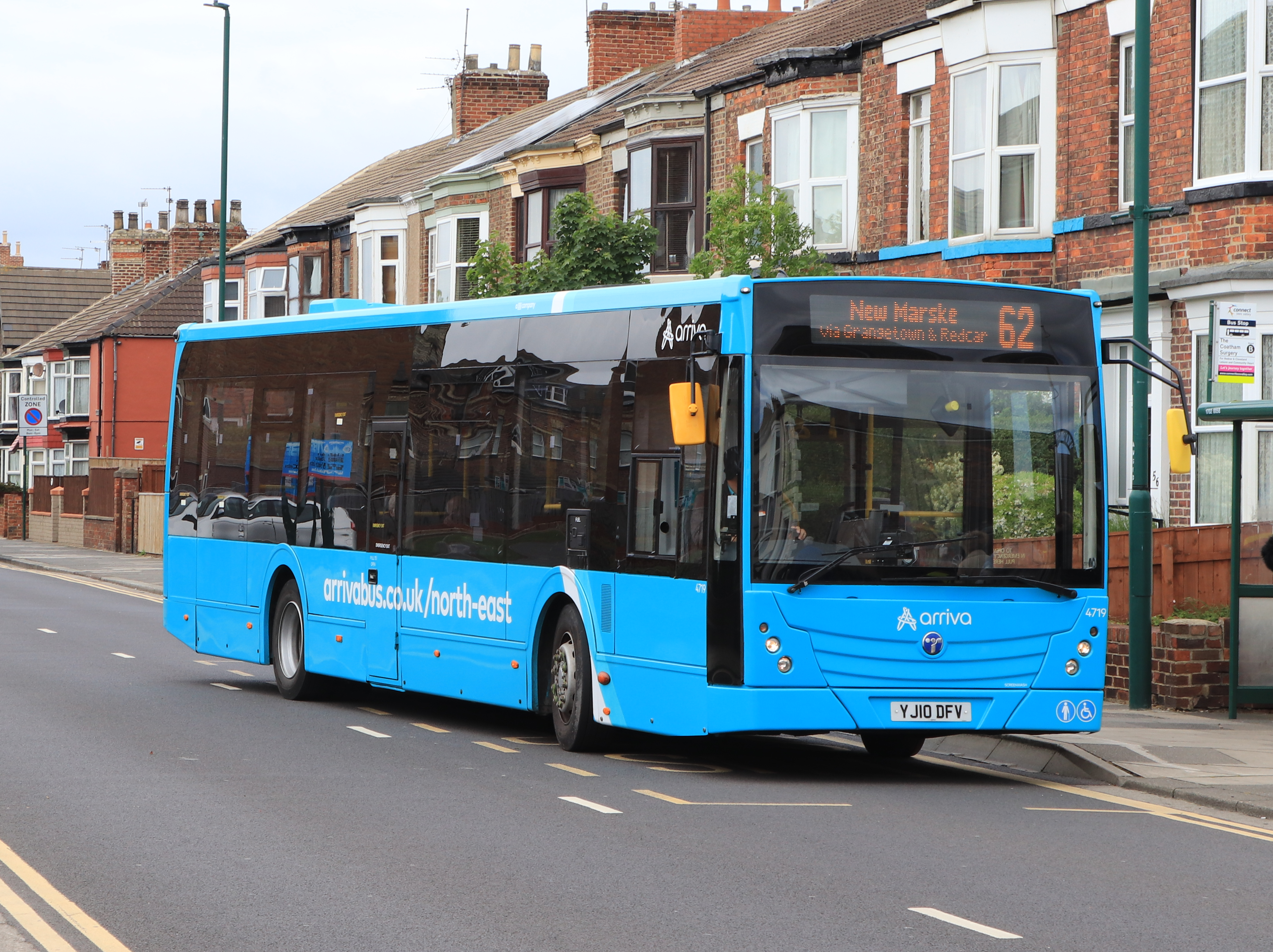
Branding: past and present

As of April 2022, vehicles in the fleet are in the process of being rebranded into the new fleet livery, which was introduced to the region in January 2018. It consists of an all-round aquamarine base with white diagonal stripe, featuring the company's updated logo. The former livery was introduced over twenty years prior, and consisted of vehicles painted in an aquamarine base, with a cream semi-circle at the front, and yellow stripe along the side of the vehicle. It was later revised, with a dark blue skirt incorporated into the livery.

MAX was designed for interurban express services, such as Ashington-based services X15 and X18, which run between Newcastle upon Tyne, Alnwick and Berwick-upon-Tweed via Morpeth, and Darlington-based services X75 and X76, which run between Darlington and Barnard Castle. At the point of introduction, vehicles were branded in a two-tone blue livery, featuring leather seats, free WiFi and USB charging points.

Sapphire was conceived as a brand for premium, high-frequency services, such as Darlington-based service 7, which runs between Durham and Darlington via Ferryhill. When introduced, vehicles were branded in a two-tone blue livery (which has since been updated following changes to the standard fleet livery), featuring leather seats, free WiFi, USB charging points and next-stop audio-visual announcements.

== In popular culture ==
In August 2016, DalesBus route 830, which runs between Richmond and Ingleton via Hawes, was the subject of an episode of television series BBC Four Goes Slow entitled The Country Bus. The episode saw a series record average audience of 800,000.
