= 2021–2023 Stagecoach strikes =

Series of bus labour strikes in the United Kingdom

2021-2023 Stagecoach strikes
- Part of the 2021–present UK cost-of-living crisis and UK industrial disputes and strikes (2022–present)
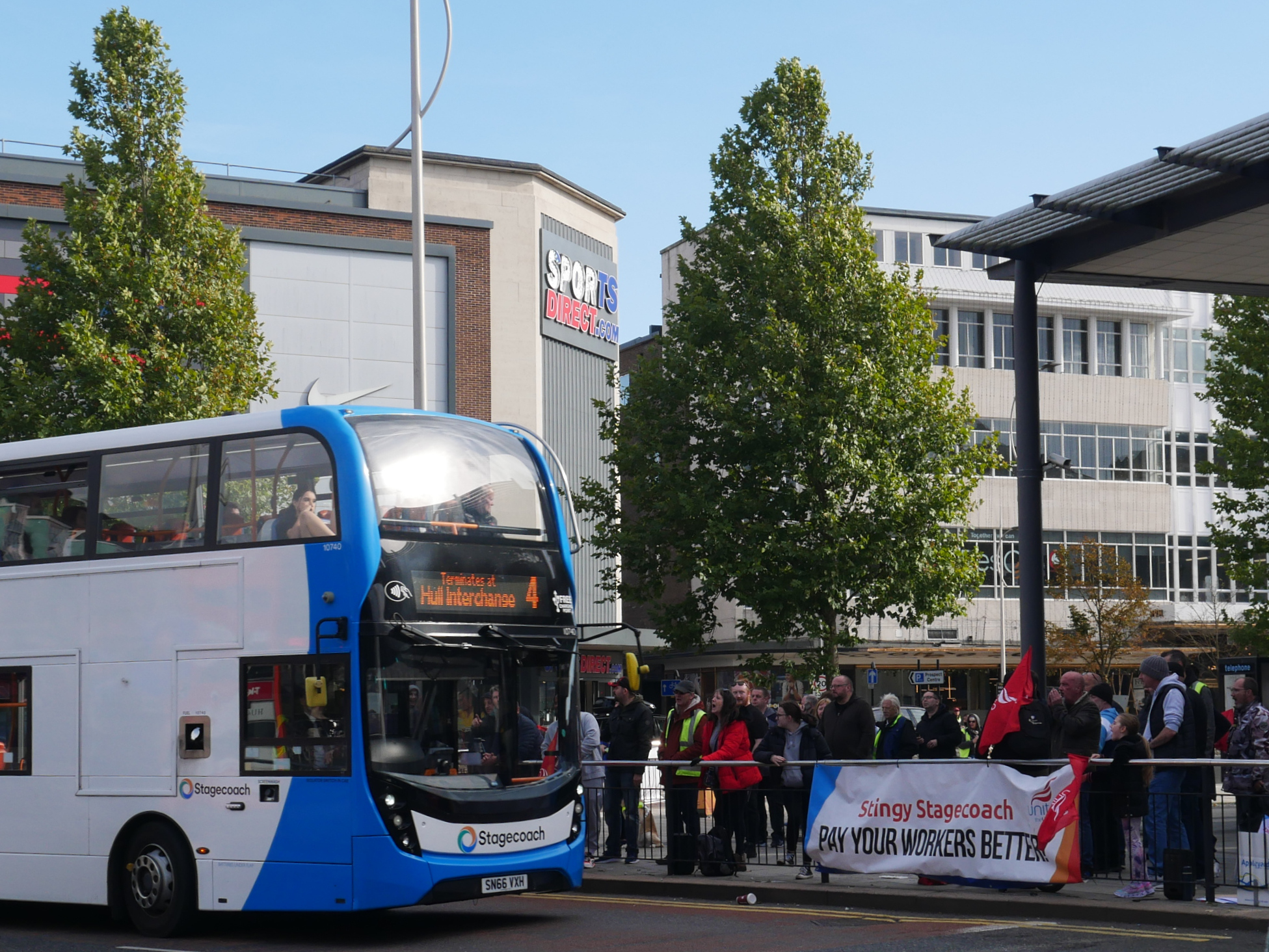
- Striking Stagecoach in Hull workers at a Unite the Union picket line outside of Hull Paragon Interchange
- Date: 6 September 2021 – 23 November 2023 (2 years, 2 months, 2 weeks and 3 days)
- Location: Various Stagecoach subsidiaries across the United Kingdom
- Caused by: Disagreements over labour contract between union and company
- Result: Pay agreements reached in certain areas Most strikes suspended before taking place

Parties
Unite; RMT; GMB	Stagecoach Group

The 2021–2023 Stagecoach strikes were a series of labour strikes by Stagecoach Group bus drivers, cleaners and engineers across the United Kingdom, the first of which began in 2021. Represented by Unite the Union, the National Union of Rail, Maritime and Transport Workers (RMT) or the GMB, workers in over 20 different areas were involved in labour disputes with Stagecoach, with strikes being called in several of those areas.

== Timeline ==
Regions in the United Kingdom where strikes were called by Stagecoach workers; blue dots indicate a strike that was averted

=== 2021 ===
On 6 September, Unite the Union warned that Stagecoach was facing potential strikes in both Lancashire and Liverpool, stating that the company "made a profit of £58.4 million and it has £875 million of available liquidity" in 2020, but that bus drivers were underpaid and were given insufficient support for self-isolation during the COVID-19 pandemic. Unite also warned of potential strikes in Kent and Scotland.

On 1 October, Stagecoach Merseyside and South Lancashire bus drivers in Lancashire voted in favour of strike action, planning days of strikes on 14, 16, and 22 October, amid concerns of driver shortages caused by low pay. On 14 October, however, the planned strike in Lancashire was called off after a new agreement was reached. The new one-year deal would include a 4.4% pay raise for drivers, up from the 2.25% the workers had received in 2020.

On 12 October, Stagecoach Yorkshire bus drivers and cleaners at their Chesterfield depot voted in favour of going on strike, with industrial action scheduled across thirteen days between 18 October and 14 December. However, Stagecoach issued a revised pay offer to drivers and cleaners in Chesterfield on 13 October, resulting in the planned industrial action being suspended. In a ballot on 20 October, staff voted to accept the revised pay offer, and the threat of industrial action in Chesterfield was dropped.

On 18 October, a planned one-day strike in Devon was called off after Stagecoach South West and the RMT reached a new agreement.

On 19 October, Stagecoach South Wales drivers began strike action. During collective bargaining agreement, the workers in south Wales, represented by Unite the Union, had sought a pay increase from £9.50 an hour to £10.50, however, the company refused, saying that it would only increase pay up to £10.10 an hour and on the condition that the workers accept cuts to sick pay and breaks. Bus drivers' wages in Wales were among the lowest in the UK, significantly less than other Stagecoach depots, and the drivers in south Wales had seen a wage freeze over the previous two years.

On 25 October, a planned strike in west Scotland was called off after an agreement was reached between Stagecoach West Scotland and its workers.

On 3 November, Unite announced that it would be escalating the strike in south Wales after further negotiations with Stagecoach South Wales broke down, potentially extending the strike through to 10 January 2022.

On 5 November, Stagecoach North East bus drivers in Teesside voted to take strike action. On 8 November, the Teesside strike began, with 12 days of strike action planned throughout November and the first week of December.

On 24 November, Stagecoach Yorkshire workers at their bus depots in Sheffield (Ecclesfield and Holbrook), Rotherham (Rawmarsh) and Barnsley voted in favour of going on strike in a dispute over a planned 2% pay rise, with Stagecoach drivers claiming that they were the lowest paid in the Sheffield area. The first round of strikes commenced on 28 November, running until 4 December in Barnsley and Rotherham and 5 December in Sheffield; during this time, only dedicated school transport services were to operate, with all other routes suspended. A second round of strike action was announced on 2 December after workers rejected a revised 4.5% pay rise offer. The second round of strikes took place in Barnsley and Rotherham between 11 December and 17 December, and in Sheffield between 12 December and 18 December, disrupting services in the run-up to Christmas.

=== 2022 ===
Industrial action by Stagecoach Yorkshire drivers continued into early 2022. On 15 December 2021, workers at bus depots in Sheffield, Rotherham and Barnsley announced that they would be taking indefinite strike action in the New Year, after two rounds of strikes at the end of 2021 had failed to advance pay negotiations. The indefinite strikes commenced on 1 January in Barnsley and Rotherham and on 2 January in Sheffield. Indefinite industrial action was suspended in Barnsley and Rotherham on 10 January, followed by in Sheffield on 11 January, after Stagecoach issued a revised pay offer. Workers at Stagecoach Yorkshire voted to accept a revised 10.7% pay rise offer on 14 January, bringing the industrial dispute in South Yorkshire to an end.

Industrial action was announced in Cheltenham and the rest of the Stagecoach West operations in March 2022, which had been scheduled to happen during the 2022 Cheltenham Gold Cup. This, however, was later averted.

Industrial action was intended to be undertaken in the Merseyside and Lancashire regions by Stagecoach staff in July 2022, however staff at Stagecoach Merseyside and South Lancashire voted to accept an offer that the company had made.

Workers at Stagecoach East Midlands's Mansfield and Worksop depots announced they were to strike in July 2022, with the strike set to begin on 24 July and further extending into August; the strike was averted following the tabling of a new pay offer recommended by the RMT. Later in September 2022, Unite representatives at Stagecoach in Hull announced that 250 workers were to take strike action from 7 October to 29 December, disrupting bus services provided for the annual Hull Fair, following complaints that a pay-rise offered by Stagecoach East Midlands did not match the offer accepted by Stagecoach Merseyside and South Lancashire workers. Initial negotiations around pay involving Acas between Stagecoach management and Unite representatives were unsuccessful, however following a second round of negotiations, the strike ended on 11 November after workers agreed to an incremental 20% pay rise.

Around 200 workers associated with the GMB at Stagecoach North East's Sunderland depot began five days of part-day strike action between 10AM and 3PM from 10 October, following the rejection of a 4% pay increase offer, followed by an additional 2% in 2023, that was condemned by the GMB as a "massive real terms pay cut". Further part-day strikes took place on 28 and 31 October, followed by further strikes on 5 November, disrupting services to Bonfire Night events in the area, from 15 to 17 November, and from for 23 to 27 December, excluding Christmas Day.

=== 2023 ===
On 4 January 2023, industrial action at Stagecoach North East's Sunderland depot ended after three-quarters of GMB-associated Stagecoach workers at the depot voted to accept a backdated 11% pay rise, as well as £150 in bonus pay.

Over 1,000 bus drivers associated with Unite at Stagecoach Manchester's Ashton, Hyde Road, Sharston and Stockport depots walked out on 11 August 2023 on a four-day strike, following the rejection of an initial 4% pay increase by Stagecoach management in June 2023, which was followed by an offer of a 14.3% pay increase as a £750 one-off payment, which was to take effect in September. Operations at Stagecoach's Middleton and Wigan depots remained unaffected by the four–day strike. Further four and five-day strikes, in coordination with Unite-affiliated First Greater Manchester drivers, were set to take place on 26–29 August and 4–8 September, however, Unite representatives for Stagecoach Manchester drivers later announced on 17 August that they would suspend their strikes to consider a new pay offer, with First drivers set to continue their strike action as planned.

Up to 300 bus drivers for Stagecoach Midlands associated with Unite in Warwickshire announced they were to take strike action "for an extended period" at depots in Leamington Spa, Nuneaton, Rugby and Stratford-upon-Avon from 5 September 2023. The strike was averted, however, on 4 September when Stagecoach Midlands management made a revised offer of a backdated 12.4% payrise over the course of two years, which would later be accepted by the Unite-associated bus drivers.

Workers at Stagecoach East Midlands's Mansfield and Worksop depots affiliated with the RMT announced in November 2023 that they again planned to strike in a pay dispute for a combined total of eight days across November and December, with strikes scheduled for 27–29 November and 4–6, 11–13 and 18–20 December. However, the strike was suspended on 23 November and ultimately called off following the offer of a 18.7% pay rise by Stagecoach management.

== See also ==
- 2021 Go North West strike
