= Kingston upon Hull City Transport =

Municipal bus operator in Kingston upon Hull, England

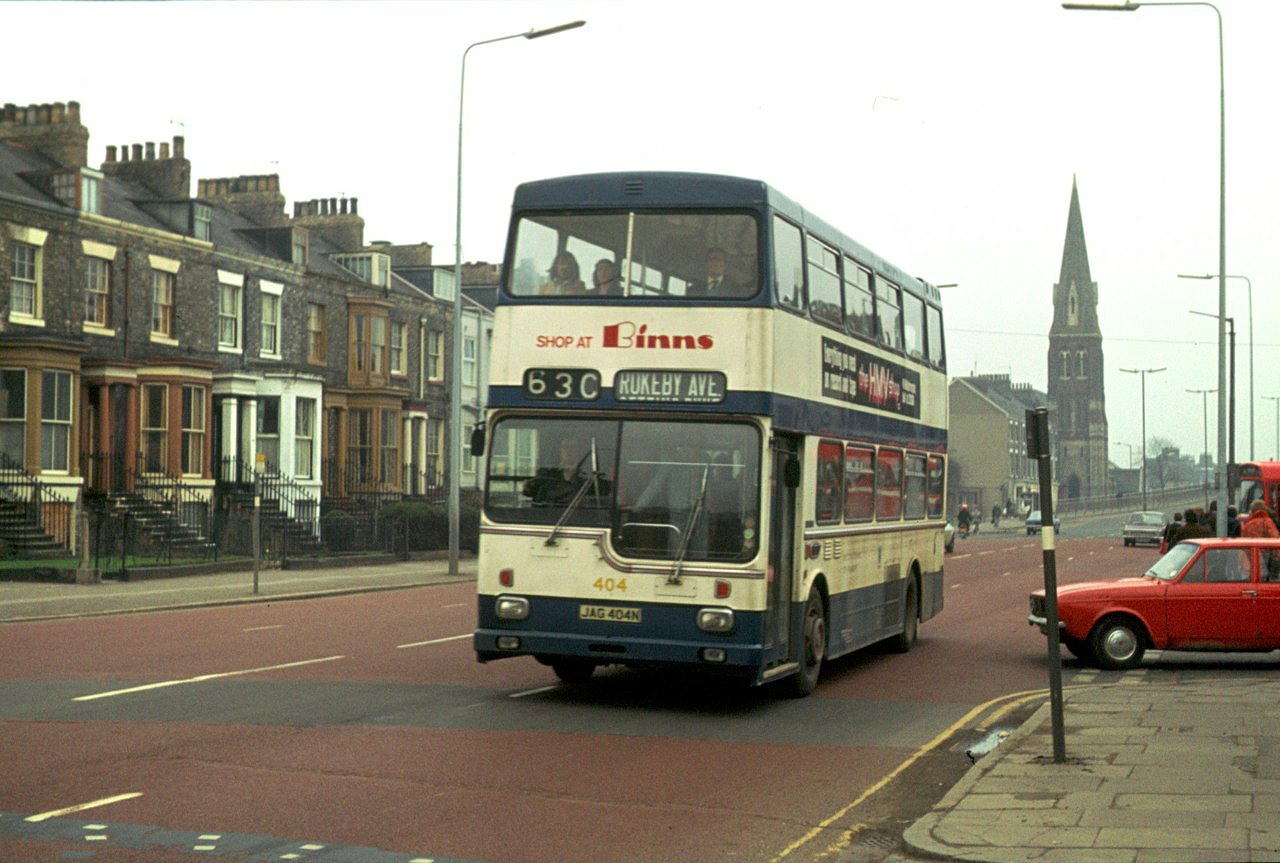
- Kingston upon Hull City Transport Scania Metropolitan on Anlaby Road in April 1979
- Parent: Kingston upon Hull City Council
- Founded: 1899; 127 years ago
- Defunct: November 1994; 31 years ago
- Headquarters: Kingston upon Hull
- Service area: Cottingham; Hedon; Kingston upon Hull; Wawne
- Service type: Bus and Coach
- Hubs: Hull Paragon Interchange
- Depots: 3
- Fleet: 228 (December 1985)

Kingston upon Hull City Transport (KHCT) was a formerly municipally-owned bus operator providing services in the city of Kingston upon Hull in the East Riding of Yorkshire, England. Founded in 1899 as part of the Hull Corporation's Transport Department (often shortened to Hull Corporation Transport), KHCT was owned and operated by Kingston upon Hull City Council until bus deregulation in October 1986. Following purchase by the Stagecoach Group in 1994, the company today trades as Stagecoach in Hull.

== History ==
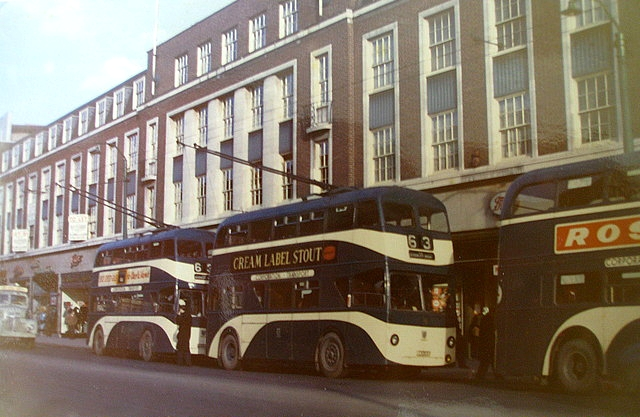
Roe bodied Sunbeam trolleybuses along King Edward Street in July 1963

The Hull Corporation's first trams commenced operations in 1899, subsequently followed by the commencement of motorbus operations in 1909, using a fleet of six buses. Operations later restarted in 1921, expanding alongside the city's trolleybus network. During the Hull Blitz on the night of 7–8 May 1941, Hull Corporation's Central garage, close in proximity to Hull Paragon Interchange and several other city centre targets, was severely damaged by bombing from the Luftwaffe. 44 motorbuses stored in the depot were destroyed, with another 21 damaged, forcing the Corporation to disperse its bus fleet across the city's various parks.

The trolleybus network was officially abandoned on 31 October 1964, having been gradually replaced by fleets of Leyland Atlantean motorbuses. Hull Corporation Transport was one of the quickest operators of one-person operated buses, and on 10 November 1972, became the first bus operator in the United Kingdom to fully phase out the use of conductors. Earlier in the same year, Hull Corporation Transport was renamed to Kingston upon Hull City Transport (KHCT), coinciding with the introduction of a new fleet livery and uniform.

Prior to deregulation, KHCT shared Hull's bus network with then-National Bus Company subsidiary East Yorkshire Motor Services (EYMS). Hull and surrounding suburban towns had been split into three joint fare zones following a co-ordination agreement between the two operators in 1934, meaning they could gain a share of bus fares around the city. KHCT's operating area expanded throughout the 1970s with the construction of both the Bransholme and Orchard Park housing estates, and in 1980, KHCT entered into the Crown Card weekly ticket scheme with East Yorkshire.

=== Deregulation ===
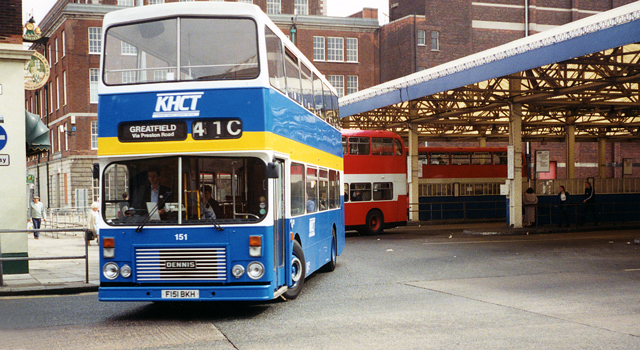
East Lancs E Type bodied Dennis Dominator in Cleveland Transit-era livery in May 1995

To comply with the Transport Act 1985 and ensuing deregulation of the bus industry, on 27 July 1986, the assets of KHCT were transferred to a new legal entity, Kingston upon Hull City Transport Ltd., which was soon followed by the closure of bus garages on Cottingham Road and Holderness Road, resulting in a significant downsizing of KHCT's bus fleet.

Following deregulation taking effect on 26 October 1986, the co-ordination agreement between KHCT and EYMS, which was now owned by its management, was abolished, and the two operators became engaged in competition from the late 1980s until 1994. Both companies began operating competitively on each other's network of services, while KHCT was challenged by smaller independent operators entering Hull's bus network, including City Traveller, Connor & Graham, Metro Citybus and Pride of the Road/North Bank Travel. These operators eventually went bankrupt or were taken over by either KHCT or EYMS, with an operator acquired in 1989 named Citilink being retained as a low-cost subsidiary of KHCT until being wound up in 1992. The company also diversified its core business to bring in additional income, forming a vehicle engineering firm named 'The Garage' at the company's former Liverpool Street central works and separate car and taxi hire franchises in Hull and Anlaby respectively.

As a consequence of competition on its core bus network, however, KHCT incurred heavy losses, losing £2 million (equivalent to £5,146,000 in 2023) and incurring £782,000 (equivalent to £2,012,000 in 2023) in debts in 1993. In July 1992, following an investigation being opened by Humberside Police into accounting irregularities at 'The Garage', Kingston upon Hull City Council seized control of KHCT back from its directors, which was followed by KHCT's external ventures being sold or dissolved later that year.

Faced with escalating financial losses and increased competition, Kingston upon Hull City Council sold KHCT to Stockton-on-Tees based Cleveland Transit in December 1993. This deal saw KHCT's employees take a 49% stake in the company, with a new livery of white and blue featuring a yellow band as well as a straplined logo reading "Employee Owners Working for You" similar to that of Cleveland's adopted, and a year later, the deal led to KHCT's 'bus war' with EYMS ending after both companies agreed to co-ordinate their Hull timetables. Half of the city council's £2.7 million (equivalent to £6,947,000 in 2023) profit from the sale, however, was lost to a £1.4 million (equivalent to £3,602,000 in 2023) debt owned to Humberside County Council, and immediately after the sale, 18 drivers and four managers were laid off by KHCT in an attempt by Cleveland Transit to make the company turn a profit.

=== Acquisition by Stagecoach ===
In November 1994, Cleveland Transit was sold to Stagecoach Holdings for £7.7 million (equivalent to £19,345,000 in 2023), resulting in KHCT becoming a subsidiary company of Stagecoach. The Transit-era KHCT blue and white livery was initially maintained by Stagecoach, however on 1 January 1996, KHCT was formally renamed Stagecoach Kingston upon Hull, later shortened to Stagecoach in Hull, with the Stagecoach corporate livery being introduced by the spring of 1996. Permission was granted by Hull City Council for Stagecoach to move operations from the former KHCT depot on Lombard Street to a new site on Foster Street, Stoneferry in November 1995, which was completed in 1996, and the Kingstonian coaching arm was acquired by EYMS and integrated into its own coaching operations in March 1997.

== Operations ==
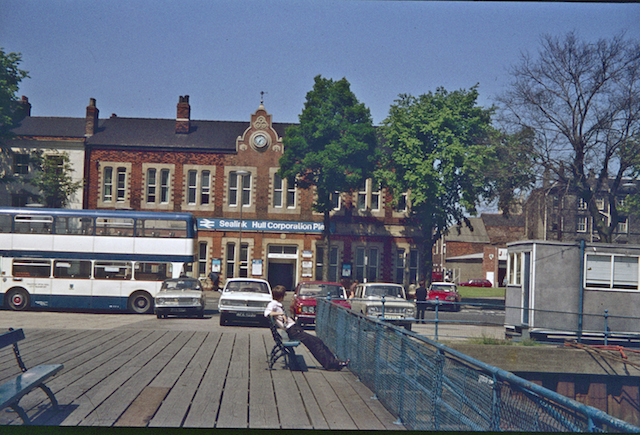
The Corporation Pier terminal of the Humber Ferry in July 1977, with a KHCT Leyland Atlantean standing outside the terminal

Prior to the opening of the Humber Bridge on 24 June 1981, KHCT operated a short bus service between Hull bus station and the Corporation Pier for travellers using the Humber Ferry. Initially, the pier was served by the city's tramways, running as route P until becoming the first tram route in Hull to be converted to motorbus operation in September 1931. Route P was later renumbered to service 50, running in this form until withdrawal in 1981.

=== Citilink ===
Citilink was a low-cost bus operation set up by KHCT in order to compete with rival bus operators around Kingston upon Hull and surrounding areas. The brand was initially an independent bus operator set up by the owner of a toy shop in 1988 to compete with KHCT following deregulation, operating with a fleet consisting of an Optare CityPacer, two AEC Routemasters and a single Daimler Fleetline. In 1989, the company was acquired by KHCT, with the fleet replaced by older buses transferred from the main KHCT fleet. These buses were painted into a green variant of KHCT livery with Citilink fleetnames. Following a scaling-back of operations, however, Citilink buses were repainted into an all-white livery for exclusive use on Hull City Council contract school services. The Citilink brand was eventually wound up in September 1992 amid the reorganisation of KHCT's operations.

=== Kingstonian ===
KHCT founded the Kingstonian luxury hire coach operation in 1982, commencing operations with a fleet of three new Plaxton Supreme bodied Leyland Leopard coaches as well as the option to hire buses from the conventional double-decker fleet. Kingstonian soon expanded into the inclusive touring market, launching the 'Coronet Tours' programme of holidays across the United Kingdom. Kingstonian directly competed with other tour operators in the Hull and Humberside area, and it was alleged in its early years that the operation was running at a heavy loss at the Hull taxpayer's expense.

As well as its core operations across Hull and Humberside, the Kingstonian coaching arm also expanded into Continental Europe shortly after deregulation with KHCT's acquisition of the formerly Eastern National-owned Voyage National in France in 1989, followed by acquiring the family-owned Kivits Reizen of Vlijmen in the Netherlands in 1990. In the United Kingdom, KHCT acquired the coaching operations of York Pullman in February 1990, integrating it as a part of Kingstonian, and later took on a National Express coach service running from York to London from collapsed operator Yorkshire Voyager in May 1991, using two Plaxton Paramount Expressliner bodied Volvo B10Ms purchased on lease for the service.

The Kingstonian arm suffered heavily amid KHCT's period of financial struggles. In 1992, York Pullman was sold to Durham Travel Services, Voyage National was sold in a management buyout, Kivits Reizen was sold to local coach operator Van Reesma, and Kingstonian's Coronet Tours programme was wound up ahead of the 1993 coach touring season. Kingstonian was retained by KHCT following its acquisition by Stagecoach Holdings in 1994, however the operation was eventually acquired by East Yorkshire Motor Services in March 1997 and integrated into East Yorkshire Coaches.

=== The Garage ===
KHCT set up The Garage in 1991 as an external vehicle engineering venture following deregulation. Services offered at the Liverpool Street premises included light and heavy vehicle repairs, painting, signwriting and washing, as well as providing driver training courses for both bus and car drivers. A car hire firm named Taits Cars was maintained by The Garage in Hull and a taxi firm named Taits Taxis in Anlaby. These were all either dissolved or merged in 1992 amid the reorganisation of KHCT in 1992.

During the trial of KHCT's finance director John King by an industrial tribunal on claims of unfair dismissal, from 1991 until its closure, The Garage had been suffering from serious financial irregularities. This resulted in an investigation by KPMG which found The Garage had made a before-tax loss of £780,217 (equivalent to £2,039,000 in 2023) compared to a budgeted profit of £339,000 (equivalent to £886,000 in 2023). As a result, King was planned to be suspended for mishandling company finances by KHCT managing director Keith Barstow, however King decided to resign his position after refusing to meet with Barstow or financial investigators. The industrial tribunal ruled in May 1993 that no unfair dismissal compensation would be paid to King because he had resigned his post instead of being suspended.

== Fleet ==
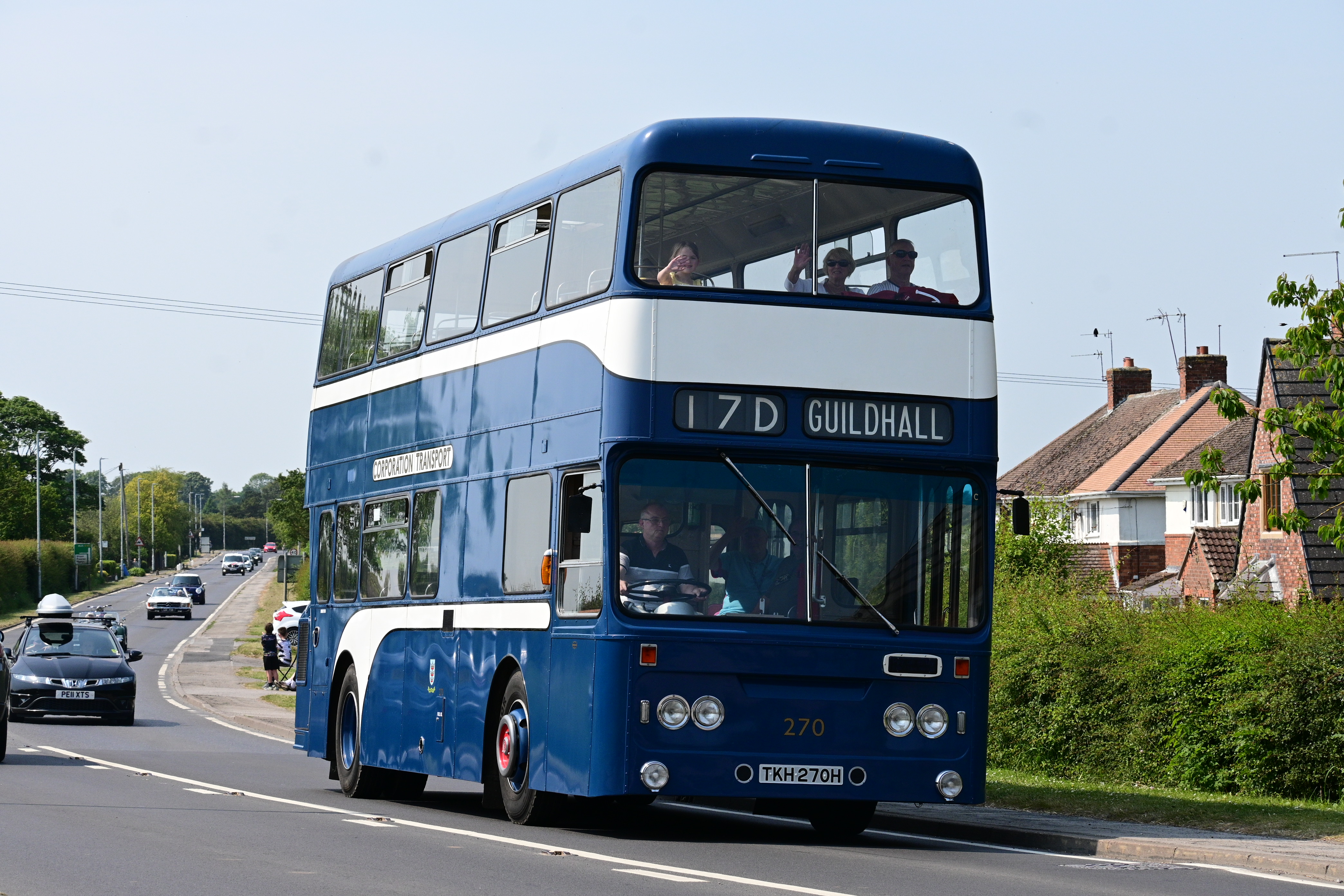
Preserved Roe bodied Leyland Atlantean in Coniston in June 2023

As of December 1985, KHCT was operating a fleet of 228 buses and coaches from three depots on Ferensway (Central), Cottingham Road and Holderness Road, with a central maintenance works also located on Liverpool Street near Hessle Road.

Throughout the 1960s and 1970s, KHCT standardised on the Leyland Atlantean rear-engined double-decker bus, purchasing 241 of the type between 1960 and 1981, a majority built with Charles H. Roe bodywork. Atlanteans built to one-person configuration from 1969 began replacing elderly conductor-operated half-cab buses, gradually converting KHCT services to one-person operation. Fleets of 30 Scania Metropolitans and 30 MCW Metrobuses were also acquired in the 1970s; further orders for fifteen more Metrobuses, as well as 20 Leyland B15 Titans were cancelled due to production delays and build quality issues and respectively, with these buses replaced with further orders for Leyland Atlanteans.

Between 1984 and 1990, KHCT purchased 51 Dennis Dominators, built with both Alexander and East Lancs bodywork, as well as fourteen Scania N113s built with East Lancs bodywork. A small handful of Alexander and East Lancs-bodied Dominators were delivered with coach seating between 1984 and 1985 for use in the Kingstonian fleet as 'Superdeckers' and 'Turbodeckers' respectively, and in 1988, six Scania N112 single decker coaches with East Lancs bodies, branded as 'City Slickers', were delivered as the first single-deckers bought new by KHCT for 23 years. KHCT's final new double-decker buses were three Northern Counties Palatine bodied Volvo Olympians, identical in specification to five delivered to parent Cleveland Transit, which were delivered shortly after the acquisition by Stagecoach in 1994.

=== Incidents ===
A woman was killed and 28 people were injured, eight seriously, when a KHCT double-decker bus and a Dutch tanker truck collided at the junction of Leads Road and Sutton Road on 12 December 1975, with the bus also hitting a car and a set of traffic lights.

On 8 February 1983, a KHCT double-decker running empty to Bransholme slipped on ice while trying to avoid a seven-car pileup and overturned off the Sutton Road Bridge down 30 feet (9.1 m) into an allotment garden. The driver of the bus was hospitalised as a result of the crash.

On 17 October 1986, a KHCT double-decker was stolen and taken on an hour-long joyride in the middle of the night through Hull city centre; the bus eventually broke down and collided with a tree on the Ings Road Estate. The driver was arrested after serious damage had been caused to the stolen bus by ramming three other buses, three police cars pursuing the stolen bus and numerous parked cars, as well as crashing into street furniture and pedestrianisation-related roadworks around the city centre.
