= BBC Four Goes Slow =

- Genre: Slow television
- Country of origin: United Kingdom
- Original language: English
- No. of series: 1
- No. of episodes: 8

Production
- Production companies: Gallery Film; Idéale Audience; BBC Scotland; The Garden

Original release
- Network: BBC Four
- Release: 3 May 2015 – 29 August 2016

BBC Four Goes Slow is a series of slow television programmes made for BBC Four, each without narration or underscore. The channel's editor, Cassian Harrison, stated that the series is an "antidote ... to the conventional grammar of television in which everything gets faster and faster". Similarities have been drawn between the series and the Norwegian trend of slow TV programmes.

== Programmes ==
=== National Gallery: A Film by Frederick Wiseman ===
Wiseman's film originally aired in December 2014. It is a three-hour tour of London's National Gallery, with no voiceover, underscore or sound effects.

=== Dawn Chorus: The Sounds of Spring ===
Dawn Chorus: The Sounds of Spring is an hour-long composite recording of birdsong at sunrise in Devon. The programme was made from three consecutive days' recording in three different locations. The programme has no voiceover or commentary, save for a few captions of historical information.

=== Handmade ===
Handmade is a three-episode part of the series, and focuses on the production of three objects—Handmade: Glass documents the blowing and shaping of glass to create a jug, Handmade: Metal shows a bladesmith using a forge to make a knife, and Handmade: Wood sees a whittler create a wooden chair.

=== All Aboard! The Canal Trip ===
All Aboard! The Canal Trip is a two-hour narrowboat journey along the Kennet and Avon Canal from Bath Top Lock (lock 13) to the Dundas Aqueduct. The episode features visual information but no spoken commentary.

=== All Aboard! The Sleigh Ride ===
All Aboard! The Sleigh Ride is a two-hour real-time reindeer sleigh ride with Sami people filmed in Karasjok Municipality in Finnmark county, Norway. It aired on 24 December 2015. It was repeated on 24 December 2016 and on 16 December 2017. The programme features two Sami women in traditional dress leading three reindeer, each with a sleigh, across the tundra following a traditional reindeer postal route from the village of Karasjok north-westward to the sea, crossing frozen lakes and birch woodland, and encountering dog sleds, ice fishermen and other nomadic Sami people. The programme covers a two-hour period, over which time the light fades and the way is lit by flaming torches. The two Sami reindeer herders are Charlotte Iselin Mathisen and Anne-Louise Gaup.

=== All Aboard! The Country Bus ===
A two-hour bus ride along the Swaledale valley in North Yorkshire was broadcast on the bank holiday of 29 August 2016. The route 830 Dalesman bus operated by Arriva North East, travels from Richmond in the east to Ingleton in the west via the Yorkshire Dales National Park. In the journey the bus passes through Grinton, Reeth, Muker, Buttertubs Pass, Hawes, Ribblehead and Chapel-le-Dale. This episode of the series was the most popular with nearly a million viewers watching it at its peak with an average of 800,000 viewers, overtaking Channel 5 and a Film 4 showing of The Bourne Legacy.

== All Aboard! ==
After the initial season of programmes were broadcast, two more long-form televisual journeys were added to the All Aboard! strand on BBC Four. The first was All Aboard! The Great Reindeer Migration on 24 December 2018, with the second, All Aboard! New Zealand by Rail, Sea and Land, being broadcast on 19 January 2020.

The first journey followed Sami herders over 160 miles as they crossed Norway’s Finnmark region to Kvaloya Fala with their reindeer. The New Zealand programme followed the Northern Explorer train from Auckland to Wellington on the North Island, The Tranz Alpine service from Christchurch to Greymouth on the South Island with a road journey from Greymouth to Milford Sound/Piopiotahi being the last part of the South Island journey, with the programme ending aboard a boat at sea.

== Reception ==
Michael Hogan, writing for The Daily Telegraph's website, gave the series a 2/5 rating, describing it as "hypnotic", implying it is relaxing. A review for The Independent said that the programmes were "oddly absorbing" and "soothing". Viewers took to social media to comment on the programme, with differing opinions; some described it as "the most boring TV show ever", and others "a proper [television] programme".

Programme	Broadcast date	Viewers (audience share)
National Gallery: A Film by Frederick Wiseman	3 May 2015	252,000 (1.3%)
Dawn Chorus: The Sounds of Spring	4 May 2015	423,000 (1.8%)
Handmade: Glass	4 May 2015	423,000 (1.8%)
Handmade: Metal	4 May 2015	339,000 (1.4%)
All Aboard! The Canal Trip	5 May 2015	599,900 (2.8%)
Handmade: Wood	6 May 2015	—N/a
All Aboard! The Sleigh Ride	24 December 2015	—N/a
All Aboard! The Country Bus	29 August 2016	800,000
