= Trams in Kingston upon Hull =

Historic tram system in Kingston upon Hull

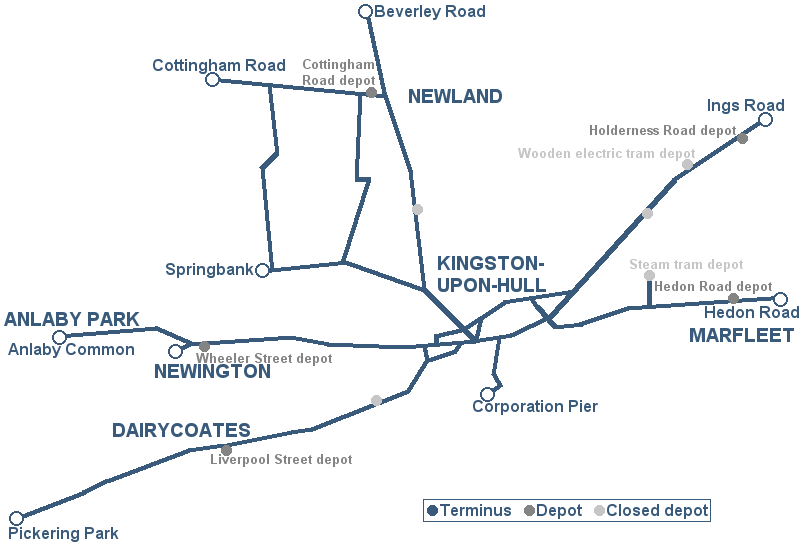
Plan of the Hull tram system

The Kingston upon Hull tramway network was a network of 4 ft 8 1/2 in (1,435 mm) standard gauge tram lines following the five main roads radially out of the city centre of Kingston upon Hull, East Riding of Yorkshire, England. Two of these lines went west, and two east. The fifth went to the north, and branched to include extra lines serving suburban areas. Additionally a short line linked the city centre to the Corporation Pier where a ferry crossed the Humber Estuary to New Holland, Lincolnshire.

The early tramway system was worked from 1876 by horse power by the Hull Street Tramways Company, except on the eastwards Hedon Road route which was operated by steam power from the outset by the Drypool and Marfleet Steam Tramways Company after 1899. Both companies were acquired by the city council in the final years of the 19th century, and the routes electrified and converted to double track, and operated as a municipal concern.

The City of Hull Tramways (later known as the Corporation Tramways) expanded the electrified tram network along the main roads of Hull up to 1927 when the tram system reached its greatest size.

Between 1937 and 1945 the system was converted to trolleybus operation. The Hull trolleybus system worked on the same paths as tram system, with the exception of the Hedon Road and Corporation Pier branches which became diesel bus operated. Later, all trolleybus services were replaced with diesel powered buses.

== History ==
=== Hull Street Tramways ===
In 1871, soon after the Tramways Act 1870 became law, permission was sought from the board of Kingston upon Hull to construct a tram system in the town. The scheme was backed by Major Trevenen James Holland and the scheme received the support of the local board, despite problems due to narrow streets in the old town – making double track running difficult as well as causing opposition from the landowning Trinity House. The construction was authorised by the Hull Tramways Order 1872, and confirmed by the Tramways Orders Confirmation (No. 4) Act 1872 (35 & 36 Vict. c. clviii), allowing the construction by the Continental and General Tramways Company of several tram lines in Hull centred on the town centre, including two westward lines along Anlaby and Hessle Road, a line north-eastward along Holderness Road, a line roughly west-north-west along Spring Bank, and a short line running southwards from the city centre to the old town to Nelson Street close to the Victoria Pier.

Hull Street Tramways Act 1878
- Act of Parliament
- Parliament of the United Kingdom
- Long title: An Act to authorise the Hull Street Tramways Company to raise additional Capital, to increase the number of Directors of the Company; and for other purposes.
- Citation: 41 & 42 Vict. c. liv

Dates
- Royal assent: 27 May 1878

Text of statute as originally enacted

On 9 January 1875 the tram route to Beverley Road was opened, and, in November 1876 the Hull Street Tramways Company (incorporated 1875) acquired the partially constructed tramway system from the Continental and General Tramways Co.. The Spring Bank route opened in 1876, the lines along Hessle Road, Anlaby Road, Holderness Road and the line through the old town were all open by 1877. The tram system was horse-operated, approximately 9 miles long, and mostly single-tracked. The company operated a fleet of around 30 vehicles, initially single-deck vehicles; later double-deck horse-drawn trailers were used, some with a capacity of over 40 persons. In 1882 over 30,000 passengers per week were being carried; most areas could be reached from the city centre for a fare of 1d.

The company had three depots, on Hessle Road (near Regent Street), (Note: 53.737432°N 0.35572°W Hessle Road near Regent Street (See 1890s Ordnance Survey maps). The site was not used after electrification, and later the location was used for a municipal bath house, Regent Street no longer exists being replaced by Rawling Way.) Temple Street, (Note: 53.75785°N 0.347169°W Temple Street, off Beverley Road. Site not used for trams after electrification.) and at Jesmond Gardens. (Note: 53.756161°N 0.308549°W No.1 Jesmond Gardens. As of 2004 the 1882 depot building is still standing. The depot was accessed by a direct route off Holderness Road parallel to Jesmond Gardens, and not from the street itself. Not used after electrification.)

The tram company was in competition with wagonettes, omnibuses and hackney carriages, though ridership and income was good, accidents were common, including some resulting in the amputation of limbs of passengers, or even their death, for which the company was liable to provide considerable compensation. Damage to tracks caused by the harsh winter of 1886/7, falling income, and rising infrastructure costs, and other circumstances beyond the control of the company, (Note: A fire at the Hessle Road depot, rises in the cost of horse feed, complaints by the Hull Corporation on the state of the track leading to a legal prosecution.) led to the company being liquidated in 1889; the eastward route to Holderness Road was sold to the Drypool and Marfleet Steam Tramways Company in 1891.

In 1895 an agreement for the Hull Corporation to purchase the company was reached – the price being £12,500; the undertaking was temporarily leased to W. Nettleton from 18 October of the same year. By November 1896 the decision had been made to run the tram system as a municipal enterprise, and the decision was made to convert it to an electric tram system.

=== Drypool and Marfleet Steam Tramways Company ===
The Hull Street Tramways scheme had included a route east from the city centre along Hedon Road, but this did not form part of the final act of Parliament. In 1885 the Drypool and Marfleet Steam Tramways Company was formed by local individuals including F. B. Grotrian. After negotiations with the Hull Corporation, which required the new company to provide a deposit of £500 per mile, and to contribute up to £500 towards the costs of any bridges along the route requiring widening, the bill for the new line was submitted in 1886.

By 1889 a section of track from Great Union Street to Hedon Road, going as far as the junction with Lee Smith Street had been completed, (Note: The line went as far as the newly constructed (1885) Alexandra Dock which was then at the outskirts of the town.) and opened for traffic. The tramway was originally intended to extend as far as the outlying village of Marfleet; extension beyond Lee Smith Street were delayed, and in 1892 the company sought to rescind from its original obligations; the maximum extent of the line was to just beyond the Holderness Drain on Hedon Road, a short branch to Drypool Bridge was also later built.

The company used two-axle steam locomotives built by Thomas Green & Son. The vehicles, which each cost £500 were fitted with apparatus enabling them to 'consume their own smoke', and had the wheels encased for safety. They drew double decker bogie carriages, seating 32 at ground level and 42 on the upper level; the upper and lower decks were enclosed. The company's depot was at Hotham Street off Hedon Road. (Note: 53.748765°N 0.306015°W The depot was connected by a short branch along Hotham Street, which was disconnected from the system by the 1900s, the site later became an electricity substation, as of 2010 the substation land retains the same boundaries as the depot.)

The line was single tracked with passing loops, a fare of 1d was charged for all journeys.

In 1899 the Hull Corporation (having acquired authority to construct an electric tramway in 1896) bought the Drypool and Marfleet Steam Tramways Company for £15,500. The system was operated under lease whilst the new electric tram system was under construction. By 1901 only two of the locomotives were still in operation, and the last steam tram ran on 13 January 1901 – the Hedon Road line was served by wagonettes until the electric tramway was opened in 1903.

=== Hull Corporation trams ===
The Hull Corporation acquired the Hull Street Tramways in 1895 and an agreement had been made to purchase the Drypool and Marfleet Steam Tramways Company in 1894, (the company was purchased in 1899). In 1896 the corporation got permission from Parliament in the Hull Corporation Tramways Order 1896 to construct and operated an electric tram system, and to get loans of £300,000 in funding. The company was initially known as the City of Hull Tramways until 1919, from then until 1931 the name Corporation Tramways was used, followed by Hull Corporation Transport until 1945. (Note: After 1945 the transport company became Kingston upon Hull Corporation Transport, and after 1975 Kingston upon Hull City Transport or KHCT.)

==== Expansion of tram system and infrastructure (1898–1927) ====
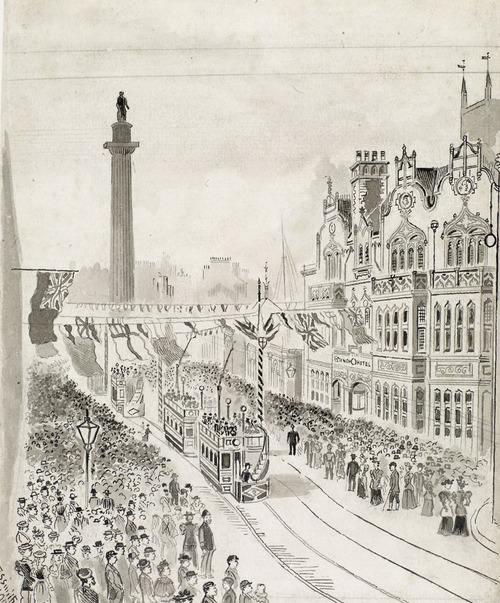
Opening ceremony of the Hull electric tramways (F. S. Smith, 1899)

The official ceremony of laying of the first rail took place on 9 June 1898. Siemens supplied electrical equipment, the rails were from Société Anonyme des Aciéries d'Angleur (Belgium), and were an unusual centre groove profile which was supposed to wear better, and give a smoother ride with rail joints cut at a diagonal angle, additionally only one point blade was required for points with the centre groove system. The tram wheels had a corresponding centre flange. The lines were constructed as double track.

For the new system a main depot with workshop facilities was built at Liverpool Street (Note: 53.732904°N 0.375352°W Liverpool Street depot and works. (Demolished)) on the Hessle Road route as well as a depot on Wheeler Street on the Anlaby Road route. (Note: 53.742405°N 0.384952°W Wheeler Street tram depot, Anlaby Road route. (As of 2010 some of the ground plan and walls remain, mostly demolished)) A depot with facilities for track maintenance was on Stepney Lane (Beverley Road route) was also opened in 1898, (Note: 53.758767°N 0.343921°W Stepney Lane depot) a street further north of the earlier Temple Street horse tram depot.

By 1899 an electric power plant in Osborne Street (Note: 53.743009°N 0.341404°W Osborne Street electrical power plant, Closed 1930. Built for exclusive use of the tram system.) supplying power to the tram system was operational and trams began running on Anlaby and Hessle Road on 5 July 1899. By 1900 lines along Holderness Road, Spring Bank (and an extension along Princes Avenue), and Beverley Road had been opened.

Further extensions took place in the 1900s; by 1903 the City Centre-Spring Bank-Princes Avenue system had been extended along Newland Avenue, the Holderness Road route extended as far as Aberdeen Street on reserved track in the central reservation of the road, and new electric tram services to Victoria Pier and along Hedon Road had been opened, and depots constructed on the eastward Holderness and Hedon routes. In 1909 a new depot on Cottingham Road took over from the Stepney Lane depot for vehicle storage. (Note: 53.769471°N 0.356838°W Cottingham Road depot. As of 2010 the site boundaries remain, including some walls (west side), the plot has been used for a housing development; the office buildings at the entrance to Cottingham Road (west side) still exist, and are used as offices.)

In the 1910s the Hedon Road service was extended to Marfleet, and a line along Spring Bank West created as far as Walton Street (the site of the Hull Fair), the Hessle Road route extended on a central reserved track to Pickering Park. Further extensions were added in the 1920s; the Holderness Road section was extended to Ings Road, the Anlaby Road section extended to Pickering Road both on reserved track. Additionally a line was completed from Beverley Road along Cottingham Road to its end at Hall Road, and another line constructed along Chanterlands Avenue from Spring Bank West to Cottingham Road; by 1927 the tram system had reached its maximum extent, at 20.48 mi (32.96 km).

A number of level crossings with the North Eastern Railway's Victoria Dock Branch Line and the line westwards out of Hull Paragon station caused delays to the trams. The crossings required catch points for the trams and interlocking with the railway signalling system. In 1925, the corporation, Ministry of Transport and the NER's successor the London and North Eastern Railway proposed to eliminate the level crossings at a cost of £1¼ million, but no work was done until the 1960s. The last improvement to infrastructure came in 1931 with the building of the North Bridge in the town centre allowing trams to cross over the River Hull avoiding the narrow Drypool Bridge.

==== Withdrawal of tram service (1931–1945) ====
In 1930 the electric power station on Osborne Street was closed; afterwards the electricity supply for the trams was purchased from the Hull City Corporation's own electricity supply, in 1931 the tram service to Victoria Pier was replaced with a motorbus service.

In 1934 Hull Corporation Transport entered into a cooperation agreement with East Yorkshire Motor Services (EYMS); services were divided into three areas: Hull City, its suburbs, and the surrounding countryside; revenues for services were split between the two companies irrespective of service provider – the city transport company received revenues from the city area, whilst EYMS received the revenues for service outside Hull, revenues in the suburbs were split between the two. As a consequence it became uneconomic to operate the outlying tram routes; services on most of the routes built in the 1920s were replaced by bus services. (Note: The Hessle and Anlaby Road extensions were closed, also the Cottingham Road section from Chanterlands Avenue to Hall Road. The Chanterlands Avenue and remainder of the Cottingham Road services were also closed and operated by buses, later by trolley buses.)

In 1936 the construction of a trolleybus system was authorised; with the exception the Hedon Road route which was replaced by a motorbus service the remaining tram routes were replaced by trolleybus operation between 1936 and 1945. (Note: The trolley bus system included the Newland Avenue and Chanterlands Avenue routes and parts of the Holderness Road, Anlaby Road, Hessle Road, Beverley Road and Cottingham Road routes.) The final tram ran on 30 June 1945; the journey celebrated by the tram being illuminated by 800 lights, accompanied by local grandees and with several tens of thousands of local people along the path.

The Wheeler Street, Cottingham Road, Liverpool Street and Aberdeen Street depots were re-used for the trolley buses. Further extension of the trolleybus system were proposed and authorised but none were built.

==== Trams ====
Fifteen trams were acquired in 1898, and another thirty in 1899; these trams were open top dual deck vehicles. By 1901 one hundred trams had been acquired; 25 of these were originally trailer vehicles, intended to be pulled by powered trams, which had been later motorised. By 1915 the number of trams had reached its maximum of 180. The trams were numbered sequentially from 1 to 180.

All the vehicles were two-axle bogieless designs with the exception of the original Tram number 101 which had a double bogie. No.101 was sold in 1916 to Erith Urban District Council. It was replaced by another Tram 101 delivered in 1923 which was an experimental design designed by the company's manager E S Rayner with cardan shaft drive to split axles via a differential.

The early trams had open upper decks, a form of roll top retractable cover, known as the 'Kennington roof' was trialled on the roofless trams in 1904; these were not totally successful, and fixed roofs were installed from 1906 onwards. From 1919 the drivers' positions and the balconies of the upper decks began to be enclosed.

Electrical equipment came from Siemens or Westinghouse for most vehicles; trams built up to 1930 had two 25 hp (19 kW) electric motors, later trams had two motors of between 33 and 42 hp (25 and 31 kW).

Car number	Cover type	Build year	Manufacturer	Seat capacity	Notes
1–15	Open top	1898	G.F. Milnes & Co.	22/29	Given short canopy covers between 1905 and 1909
16–25	Open top	1899	G.F. Milnes & Co.	22/29	Given short canopy covers between 1905 and 1909
26–30	Open top	1899	Brill	22/29	Given short canopy covers between 1905 and 1909
31–60	Open top	1900	Brush	22/29	Given short canopy covers between 1905 and 1909
61–65	Open top	1900	ER&TCW	22/31	Given short canopy covers between 1905 and 1909
66–90	Open top	1900	G.F. Milnes & Co.	22/29	Delivered as trailers built 1898–99 numbered 101–125, bodies mounted on motorised truck after 1900 and renumbered, later given upper deck covers
91–100	Open top	1901	Hurst Nelson	22/31	Later given short canopy covers. No. 96 converted to a single deck snowplough and works vehicle in 1933.
101	Open top	1900	G.F. Milnes & Co.	39/30	Bogie tram, short upper deck cover added 1909, sold in 1916
101	Enclosed	1923	English Electric	42/24	
102–116	Covered, open balcony	1903	G.F. Milnes & Co.	22/29	Initially open topped, converted with covered tops before entering service. A second number 113 was built in 1925 at Liverpool Street depot; it was a fully enclosed vehicle, and the last tram built for the system
117–122	Covered, open balcony	1909	United Electric Car Company	36/22	Fitted with covered balcony between 1916 and 1919
123–136	Covered, open balcony	1909/10	Hull City Tramways	36/22	Built at Liverpool Street Works, with Siemens electrical equipment
137–160	Covered, open balcony	1912	Brush	34/22	Fitted with covered balcony between 1916 and 1919
161–180	Covered with vestibule	1915	Brush	40/22	
Sources :

== Heritage and remnants ==
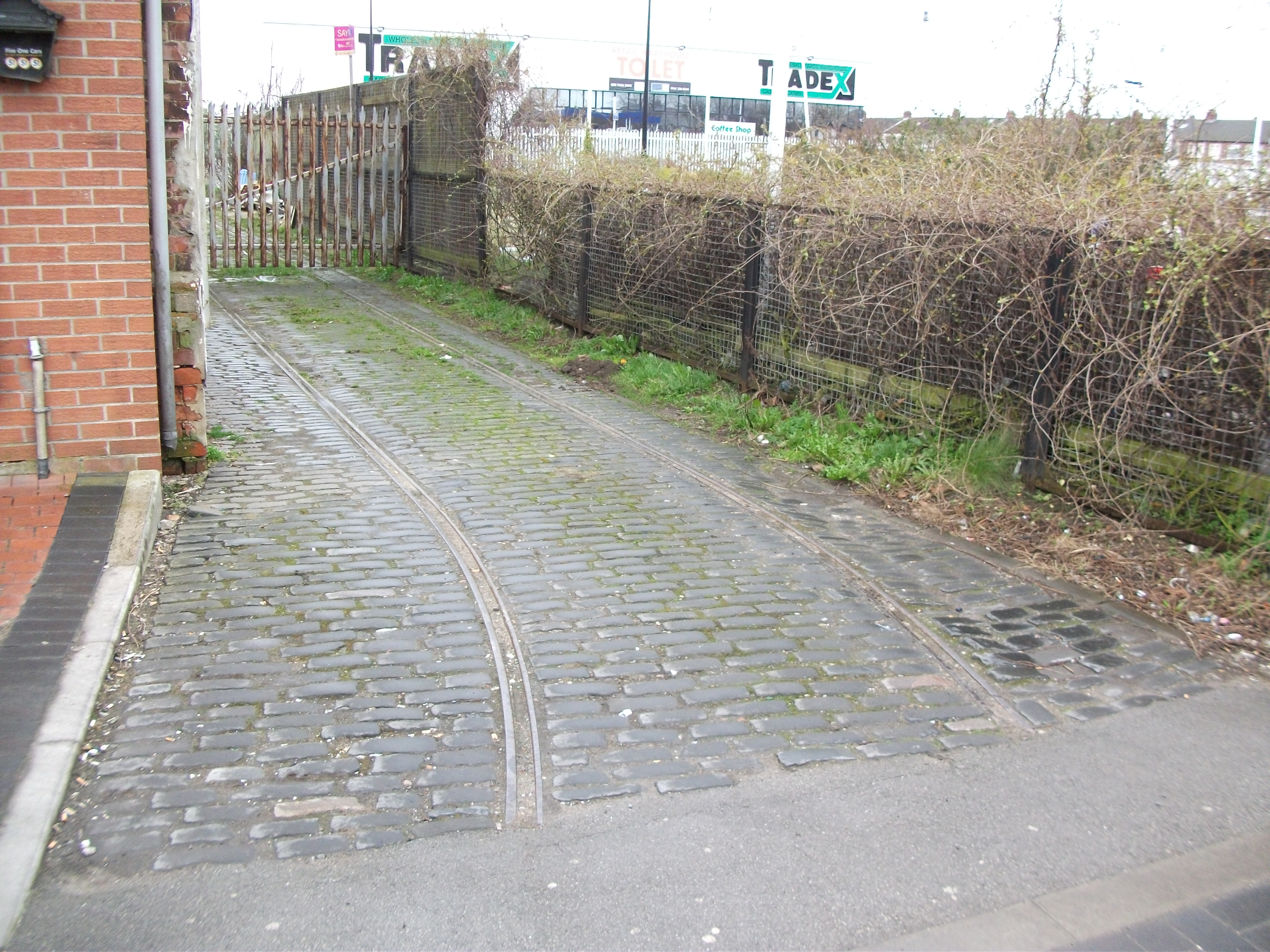
Centre groove rail at former Wheeler Street depot (Anlaby Road entrance)

As of 2017 tram number 132 is on display at the Streetlife Museum of Transport in Hull, Tram number 96 is preserved and modified as a single deck vehicle at the Heaton Park Tramway, Manchester.

In 2018 a short section of track has survived at the Anlaby Road entrance to the former Wheeler Street Depot, additionally the offices of the Cottingham Road depot, and the original horse tram depot at Jesmond Gardens, Holderness Road are still extant.

At the city outskirts the reserved track sections were built on a central reservation; these sections on Anlaby, Holderness, Hessle and Beverley Road were converted to dual carriageways; the tram sections now form part of a wide central grass section between the carriageways.

== See also ==
- Doncaster Tramway, the other electric tramway in the UK to use centre groove rail
