= York Pullman =

Bus operator in North Yorkshire, England

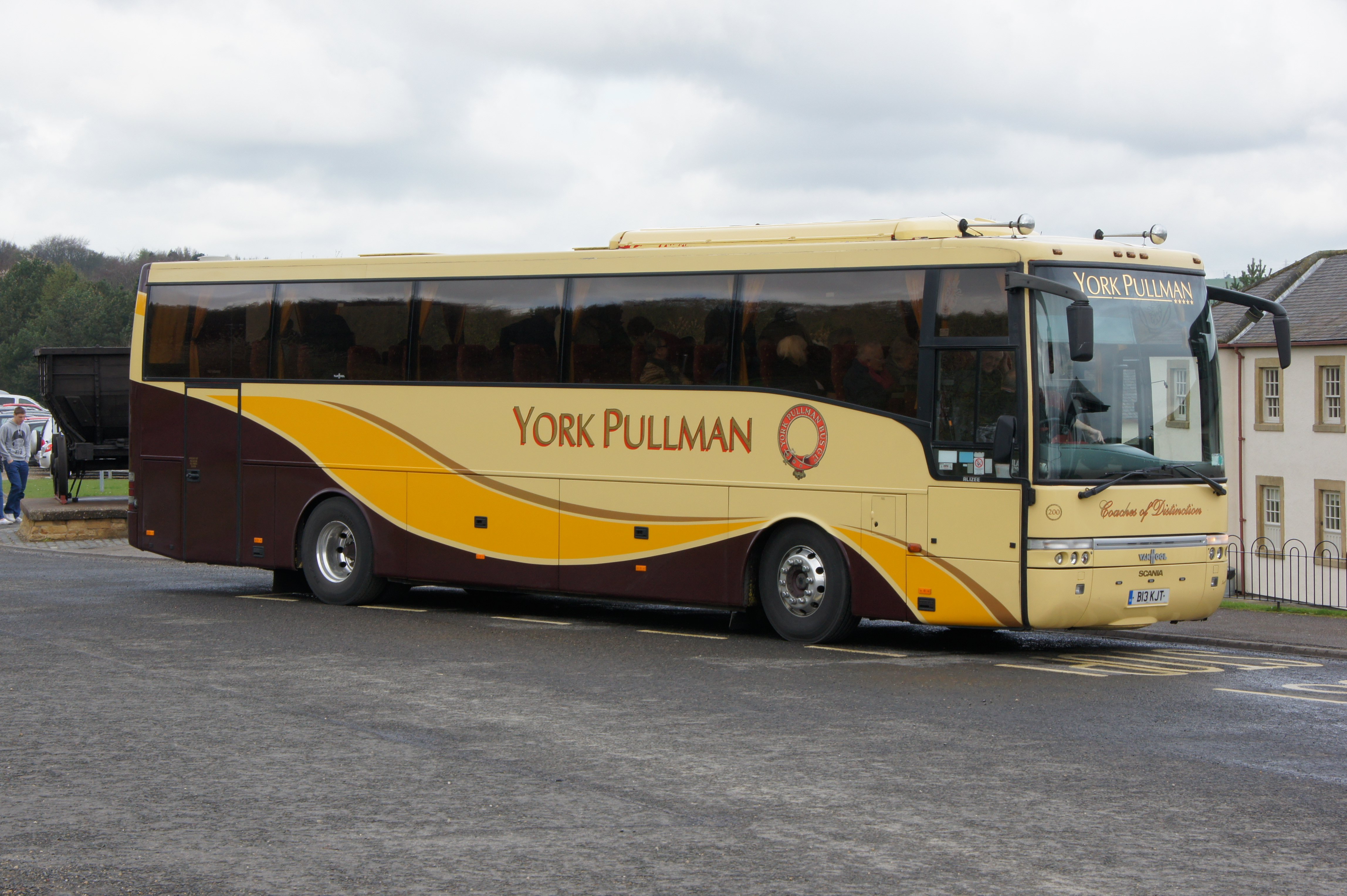
Van Hool bodied Scania K114IB coach

York Pullman was a bus operating company based in Rufforth, North Yorkshire, England. Founded in 1926 by Norman Pearce and Hartas Foxton, the company operated from 1926 until it was deregistered in 2000.

In 2007, the company was revived by haulage firm K&J Logistics for excursions and open-top tours of York. This reconstituted company expanded into bus and coach services in and around North Yorkshire, before it was acquired by FirstGroup in January 2024.

== History ==
=== Original company (1926–2000) ===
York Pullman (1926–2000)
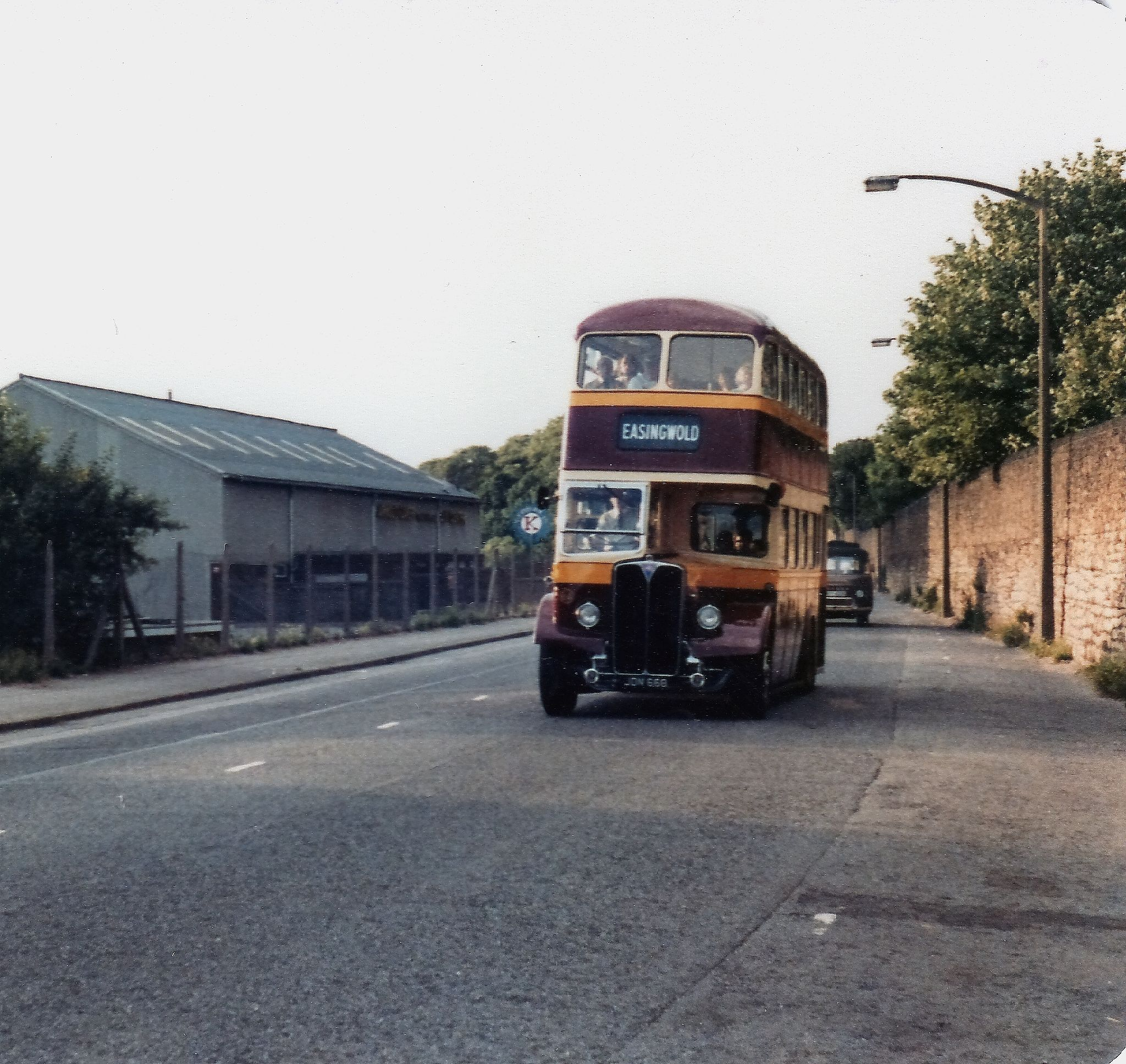
- Preserved Roe bodied AEC Regent III
- Parent: Kingston upon Hull City Transport (1990–93); Durham Travel Services (1993–2000)
- Founded: October 1926
- Defunct: February 2000
- Headquarters: York
- Service area: York; North Yorkshire; East Riding of Yorkshire
- Service type: Bus & coach services

York Pullman was founded in 1926 as a partnership between Norman Pearce and Hartas Foxton. Over the preceding six years, Foxton had operated a service between York and Stamford Bridge. Its name and livery of maroon, cream and yellow was derived from the luxury Pullman train carriages in use at the time.

In January 1930, Pearce left the company and Foxton became its sole owner, a position he retained until his death thirty years later. In 1938, Pullman opened a new depot in York's Navigation Road to complement its three existing sites, which were no longer large enough to hold the company's fleet. One of these garages, Piccadilly in York, was used by the government during World War II. In 1951, the company moved its headquarters to Bootham Tower.

Pullman continued to expand, and by the 1970s was carrying over one million passengers annually. By 1974, its fleet had increased to 30 vehicles, becoming the largest operator of tours and excursions in York, plus a small number of local bus services. Coach services were deregulated in October 1980; Pullman introduced a service between York and London in conjunction with Epsom Coaches, but this proved unsuccessful and was quickly withdrawn. The Foxton family, which had retained control of the firm after Hartas Foxton's death in 1960, sold York Pullman to Reynard Coaches in January 1985.

The newly enlarged company, now owned by John and David Marsh, was renamed Reynard Pullman. Following the deregulation of bus services in October 1986, new services were introduced in competition with established operators. By 1988 the fleet stood at 47 vehicles, the majority of which were used on scheduled services in Harrogate, Tadcaster and York, in the latter case in competition with York City & District. The expansion proved short-lived, with the York Pullman name and 20 coaches sold to municipal operator Kingston upon Hull City Transport in February 1990. Later in the same year Reynard itself was acquired by Yorkshire Rider, which also took over York City & District to end competition in York.

KHCT began to face both increased competition on its core network and financial difficulties in the 1990s, and in 1993 it was decided to privatise the company. In readiness for this coaching activities were reduced, and York Pullman was sold to Durham Travel Services who expanded its operations to include school buses, open-top tours and contracted bus services, but in February 2000 sold its York operations to First York, who had earlier acquired Yorkshire Rider and were the dominant operator in the city. The York Pullman name was abandoned, and the office at Bootham Tower closed in October 2002, breaking the last link with the original company. Some of Pullman's older vehicles have been preserved.

=== Revival (2007–present) ===
York Pullman (2007–present)
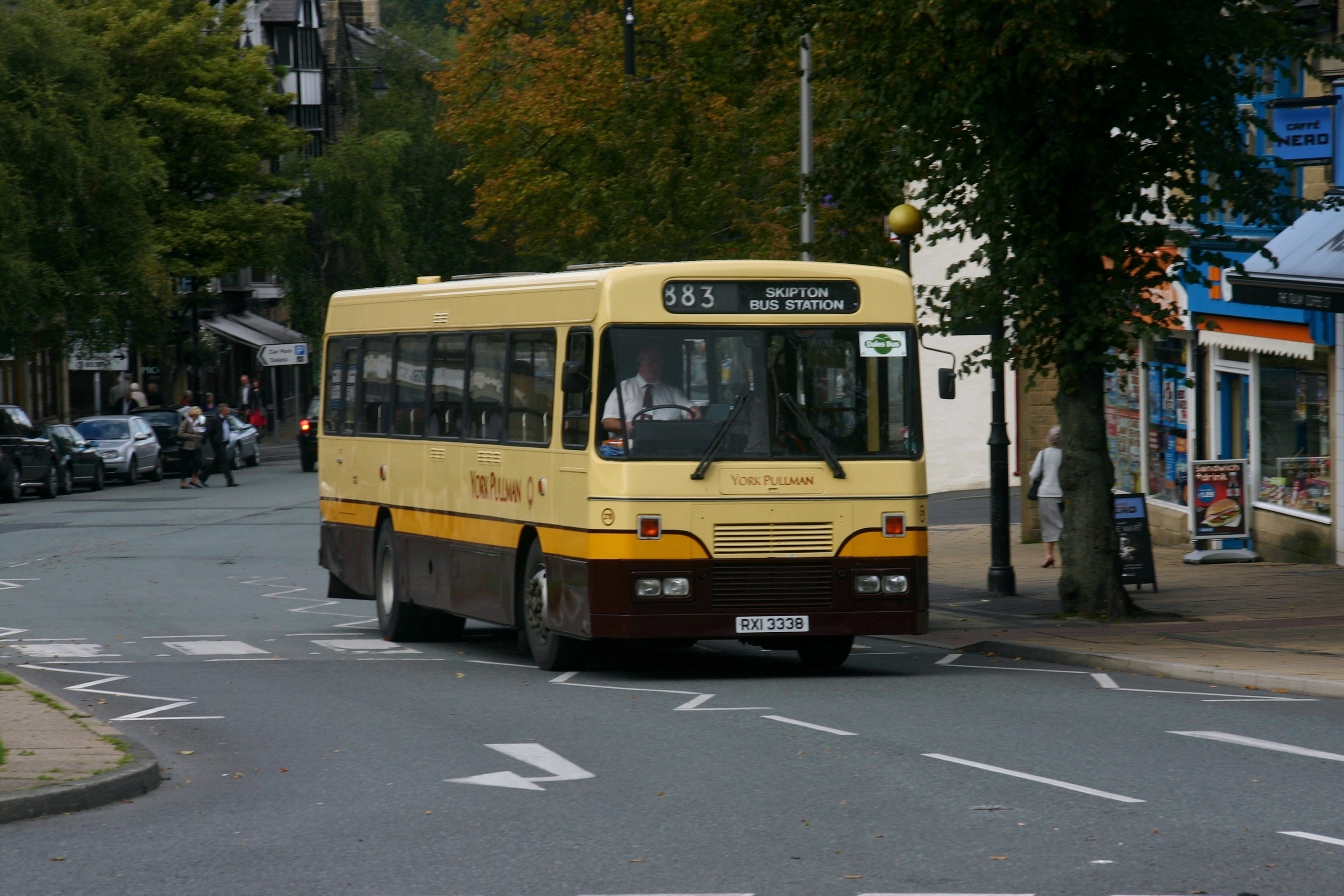
- Alexander bodied Leyland Tiger in Ilkley in September 2011
- Parent: K&J Logistics (2007–2024); FirstGroup (2024-present)
- Founded: January 2007
- Headquarters: York
- Service type: Coach hire
- Fleet: 130+ (February 2024)

K&J Logistics, a haulage firm which also operated a small number of buses, was formed in 2001 with a depot in Rufforth. Its managing director, Tom James, had worked for York Pullman during the 1980s. In 2007 the former Pullman office at Bootham Tower became available for lease. K&J moved into the office and decided to revive the Pullman name, which was no longer registered by an existing company. K&J also reopened the former booking office in York's Exhibition Square and acquired the original company's telephone number. Ten vehicles were initially painted into Pullman livery, and were first used in April 2007. To coincide with the reintroduction of the name, the company introduced a sightseeing tour of York using open-top buses in addition to coach hire and excursion work. Later, in September 2007, the company won the Best Small Operator award at the Showbus Rally 2007.

In October 2009 Pullman's school bus services to Fulford School was used by City of York Council to trial a texting service designed to prevent bullying on school buses.

In late September 2010 a new route between York city centre and the two campuses used by the University of York was introduced. Branded as Unibus, the service was subsidised by the university, who stated that First York had declined to extend its existing service 4 to serve the newly opened campus at Heslington East. In response to the new route's introduction First extended route 4 to Heslington East in competition with Pullman's route and reduced its fares on the route.

A York Pullman bus became stuck in a ditch while operating route 36 in Melbourne in October 2010. In April 2011 another vehicle caught fire after its engine overheated while working a service to Manor C of E School on the A1237 road in April 2011, but pupils were quickly evacuated by the driver and there were no injuries. The company stepped in to replace two journeys withdrawn by East Yorkshire Motor Services on their route 195 in September 2011, taking over their operation as route X36 on a short-term contract.

In February 2012 Transdev York purchased the local services operated by York Pullman with 17 buses and 31 staff transferring.

Having expanded back into rail replacement coaching and council-contracted bus services since disposing of its local services, it was announced on 26 January 2024 that the FirstGroup had agreed to purchase York Pullman. The sale was completed in February 2024, with the company retained as a subsidiary of the First North and West Yorkshire business unit, bringing over 130 buses and coaches into the FirstGroup fleet.

== Operations ==
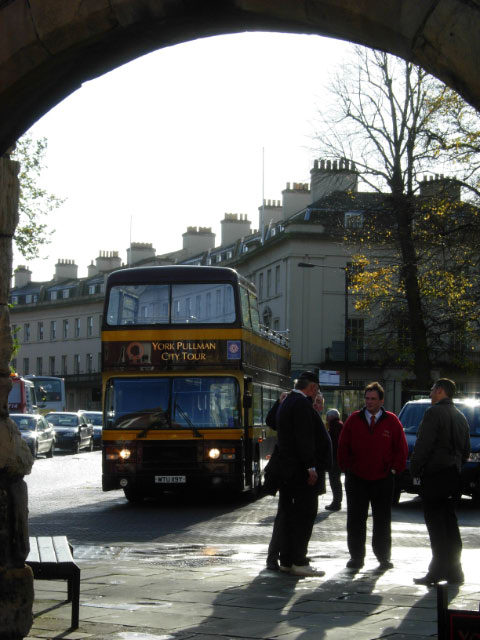
Open-top Leyland Olympian in York in November 2009

Before February 2012, York Pullman operated a network of local services; these are now operated by Transdev York, who initially retained the same timetables as those used by Pullman. The coach hire side of the business was not affected and continues to operate. School bus services are also provided by the company. Three summer Sunday services continued to be operated by York Pullman as part of the DalesBus network until 2014. In August 2016 Pullman returned to local bus work, taking over route 36, which operates between York and Sutton upon Derwent/Pocklington six days a week.

== Fleet ==
The original York Pullman company used a variety of types over the course of its existence. Prominent models operated included the AEC Regal III single-decker and AEC Regent III double-decker; examples of both have been preserved.

K&J Logistics operated 30 vehicles at the time that it adopted the York Pullman name. Ten were painted into Pullman colours, including six coaches (five Volvo B10Ms and a Scania K114IB), three open-top double-deckers (a Bristol VR, a Leyland Titan and a Leyland Olympian) and a minibus. These buses were given fleet numbers beginning at 195, continuing the numbering sequence used by the original company before 2000.

The revived company's fleet later developed includes several types of coach, low-floor buses for local routes, and an open-top AEC Routemaster. Several Leyland Tiger single-deckers were acquired from Ulsterbus in 2010. Seventeen vehicles were sold to Transdev York as part of the February 2012 sale, leaving 50 vehicles in the Pullman fleet.
