= DalesBus =

Brand of weekend bus services, in the Yorkshire dales

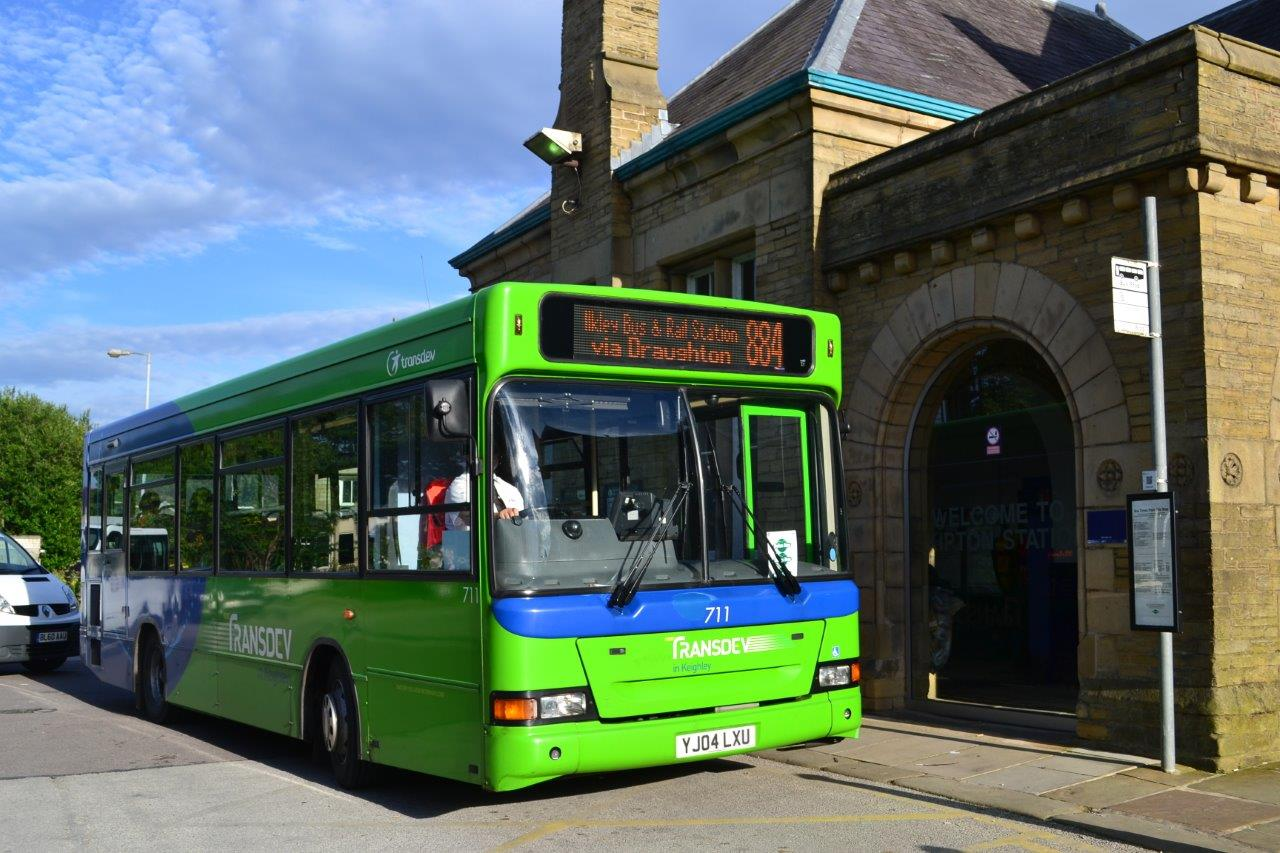
- Headquarters: Gargrave, North Yorkshire
- Service area: Cumbria; Lancashire; North Yorkshire; West Yorkshire
- Service type: Bus and coach
- Website: www.dalesbus.org

DalesBus is a bus network serving the Yorkshire Dales managed by Dales and Bowland Community Interest Company, a volunteer-run subsidiary of the Yorkshire Dales Society.

Services are funded by several organisations, including the National Trust, North Yorkshire Council, West Yorkshire Metro, Yorkshire Dales National Park, Yorkshire Water, York and North Yorkshire Combined Authority and community groups. Over 30,000 passengers used the network in 2019/20, increasing to over 60,000 in 2025/26.

DalesBus services operate at weekends and on bank holidays, some run year-round, whilst others run summer-only. They run into and around the Yorkshire Dales area, including the Yorkshire Dales National Park and Nidderdale National Landscape.

DalesBus Ramblers organise a programme of guided walks in the Yorkshire Dales accessible by DalesBus and other bus and train services.

== History ==
The current service began in 2007 with a single route between Ilkley and Skipton.

=== Controversy ===
In 2015, North Yorkshire County Council withdrew English National Concessionary Travel Scheme (ENCTS) payments for some of these services, regarding them as only for "tourist use" and therefore outside of statutory provision. In the following year, Lancashire County Council made the decision to follow suit, citing similar reasons to do so. In December 2025 North Yorkshire Council advised that all DalesBus services would be included in the ENCTS on a discretionary basis.

== Services and operators ==
As of 2026, the following services are operated under the DalesBus brand.

Operator	Service(s)
Arriva North East	830, 831, 832, 858, 859
East Yorkshire	822
First West Yorkshire	876
Transdev Blazefield	24, 59, 74, 820, 821, 825, 864, 866, 873 & 875
Kirkby Lonsdale Coach Hire	80
Little White Bus	857, 858
Procters	856
York Pullman	874

== In popular culture ==
In 2016, route 830's commentary free journey through Swaledale, was an episode of television series BBC Four Goes Slow entitled All Aboard! The Country Bus. The episode saw a series record audience of 800,000.
