= Cleveland Transit =

Former municipal bus company in England

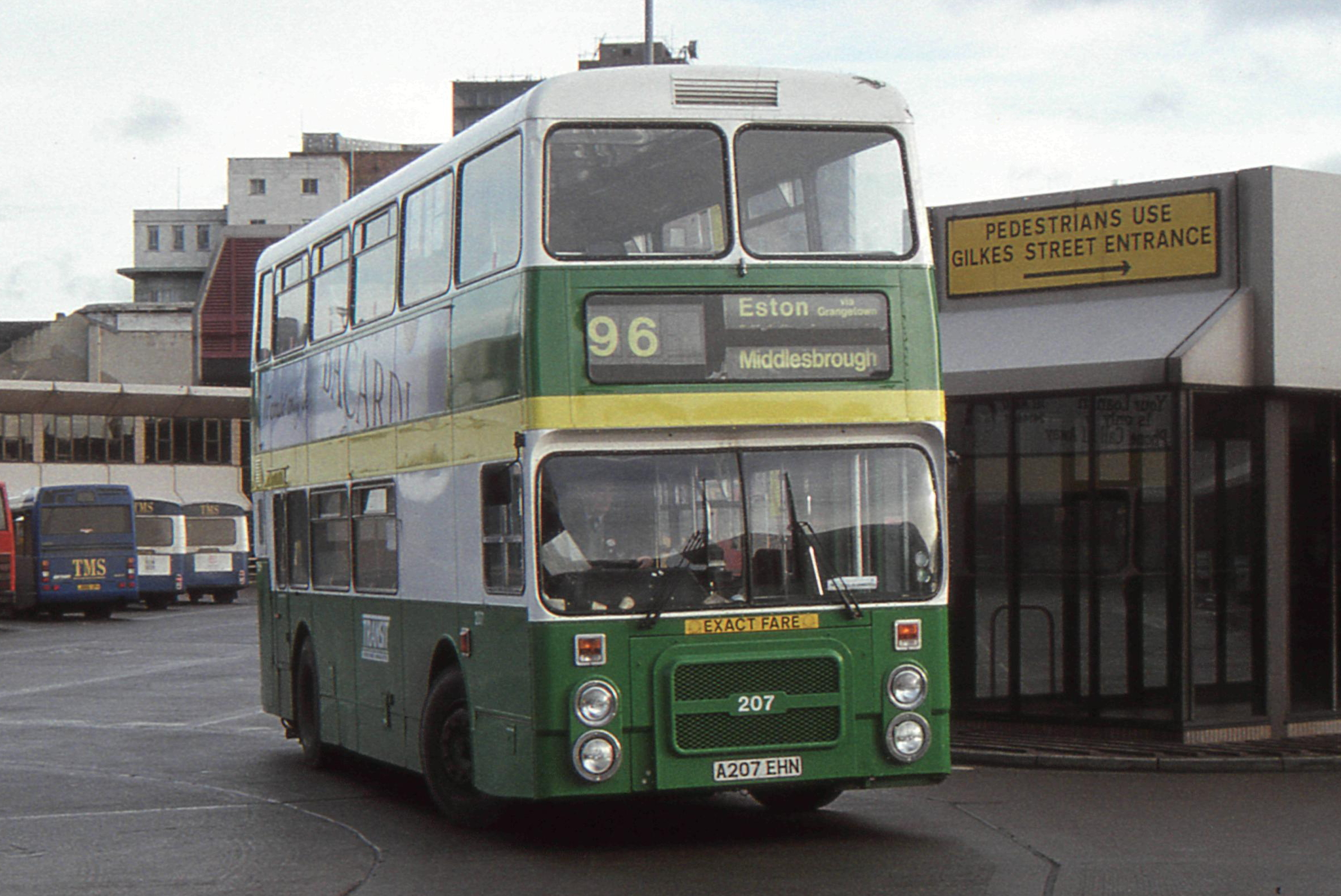
- Cleveland Transit Northern Counties bodied Dennis Dominator at Middlesbrough bus station, 1993
- Founded: 1 April 1974; 51 years ago
- Defunct: November 1994; 30 years ago
- Headquarters: Stockton-on-Tees
- Locale: Cleveland, England
- Service area: Middlesbrough; Langbaurgh-on-Tees; Stockton-on-Tees
- Service type: Bus and coach
- Alliance: Hartlepool Borough Transport

Cleveland Transit was a municipal bus operator based in the former county of Cleveland in northern England, operating from 1974 until its purchase by the Stagecoach Group in 1994.

== History ==
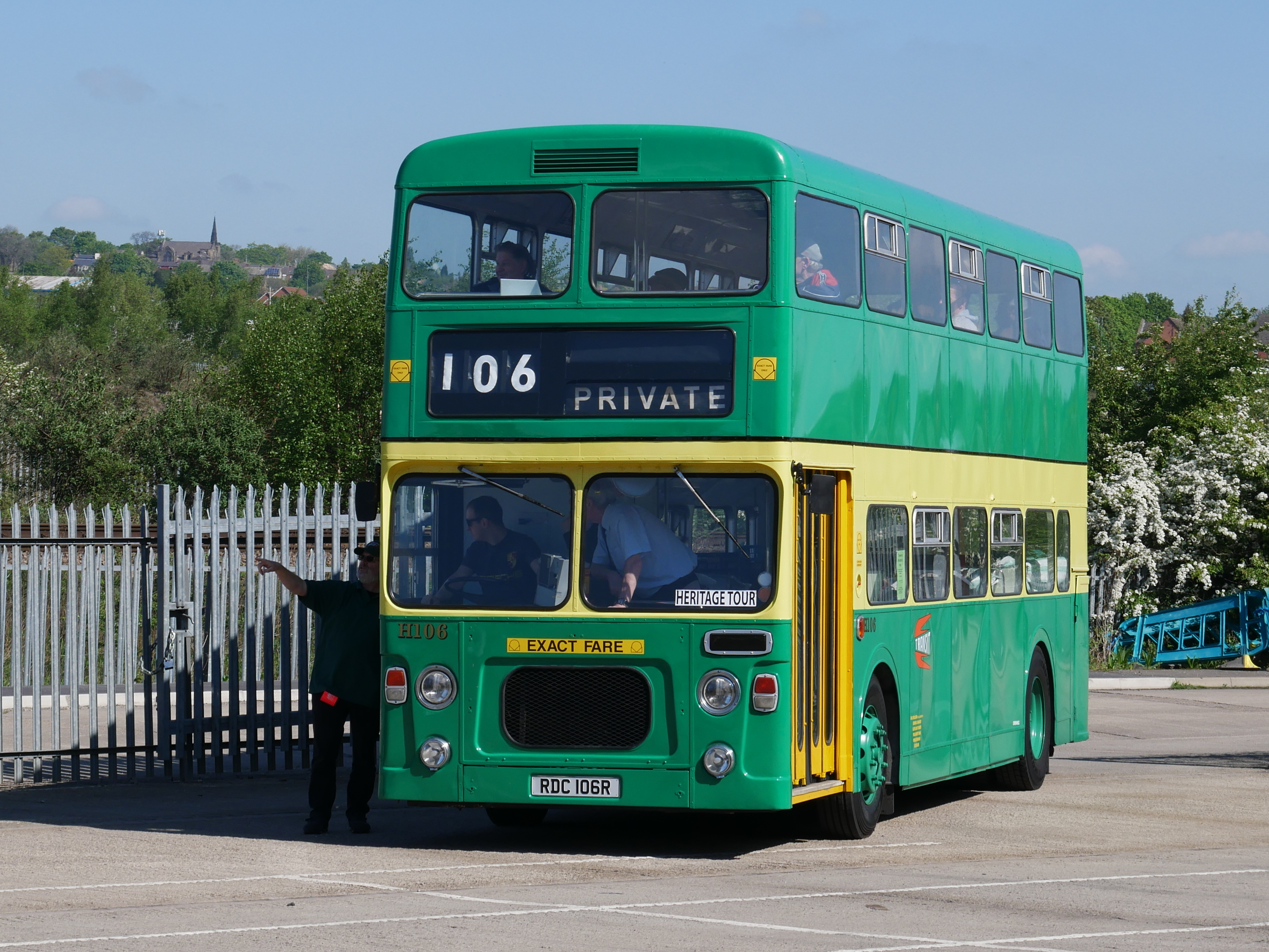
Preserved Cleveland Transit Bristol VRT at the South Yorkshire Transport Museum, 2019

The non-metropolitan county of Cleveland was formed by the Local Government Act 1972, incorporating the County Borough of Teesside and other authorities including Hartlepool. Its new districts were Stockton-on-Tees, Middlesbrough, Langbaurgh-on-Tees and Hartlepool. Upon this reorganisation in April 1974, the six-year-old Teesside Municipal Transport's operations became a joint council committee of the first three of these districts, named Cleveland Transit.

The municipal operation provided bus and coach services in the new county for the next twelve years, adopting a green and primrose livery for its fleet. Cleveland Transit standardised on a fleet of Northern Counties-bodied Leyland Fleetlines, which were rebodied in the 1980s, Bristol VRs and Dennis Dominator double-decker buses and Leyland Leopard single-decks in this period, also experimentally operating a Rolls Royce-engined Leyland Fleetline converted to run on liquid petroleum gas, the first LPG-powered double-decker in the United Kingdom, in the mid-1970s.

Deregulation in 1986 saw Cleveland Transit take on a new green, white and yellow corporate identity and be reincorporated as an 'arm's length' company. After a protracted period of negotiation between Cleveland Transit staff and the councils involved in the joint committee, during which the company became engaged in a bus war with rival Trimdon Motor Services in Stockton-on-Tees, endured a net loss of £484,000 (equivalent to £1,521,000 in 2023) in 1989 and closed a depot in Middlesbrough, Cleveland Transit was purchased by its employees in May 1991 in an employee share ownership plan, with the company adopting the slogan 'Employee Owners Working for You'.

Originally founded in September 1991 and responsible for contracted school services and bookable day trips, Cleveland Transit reorganised its coaching arm Cleveland Coaches in 1992, turning it into a National Express contractor which also offered coach holidays to various destinations. Cleveland Transit purchased Kingston upon Hull City Transport (KHCT), a former municipal bus operator located in the non-metropolitan county of Humberside that was losing £100,000 (equivalent to £257,000 in 2023) a month, from the city council for over £2 million (equivalent to £5,146,000 in 2023) in December 1993. Employees at KHCT retained 49% ownership of the company and the livery of KHCT was changed to one similar to Cleveland Transit.

In November 1994, Cleveland Transit and KHCT were both purchased by Stagecoach Holdings for £8.3 million (equivalent to £20,852,000 in 2023). The Cleveland Transit identity was originally retained by Stagecoach for a short period, with new Northern Counties Palatine bodied Volvo Olympians being delivered with 'Part of the Stagecoach Group' slogans on the Cleveland Transit logos, however full Stagecoach identity began to be adopted for the Cleveland Transit fleet from 1995 onwards. The operations of Cleveland Transit are today part of Stagecoach North East.
