= Dales & District =

Bus operator based in North Yorkshire, England

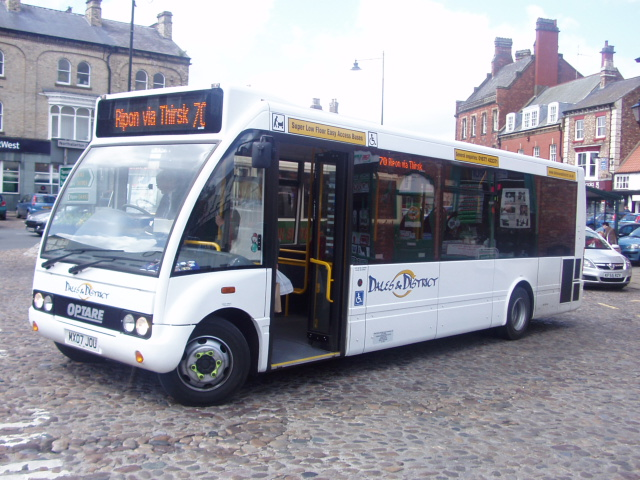
- Parent: Procters Coaches
- Headquarters: Leeming Bar
- Service area: North Yorkshire
- Service type: Bus and coach
- Routes: 9
- Managing Director: Kevin John Procter
- Website: www.procterscoaches.com

Procters Coaches operates Dales & District branded local bus services in North Yorkshire, England.

== History ==
In April 2016, Procters Coaches withdrew from two Dales & District branded services, in Northallerton, it claimed were not commercially viable. North Yorkshire County Council took over the routes.

In 2022, the firm's DalesBus 856 between Hawes and Northallerton received grant funding from Bedale Town Council following termination of subsidy from LNER.

As of April 2024, its commercial 73 service between Northallerton and Bedale was reintroduced to operate on a half hourly basis for the majority of the day, 6 days a week. The company also took on supported Service 53 which runs a similar route to Service 73, however the 53 serves Leeming village and Northallerton Friarage Hospital instead with only 2 return journeys being provided.
