= Trolleybuses in Kingston upon Hull =

Kingston upon Hull trolleybus system
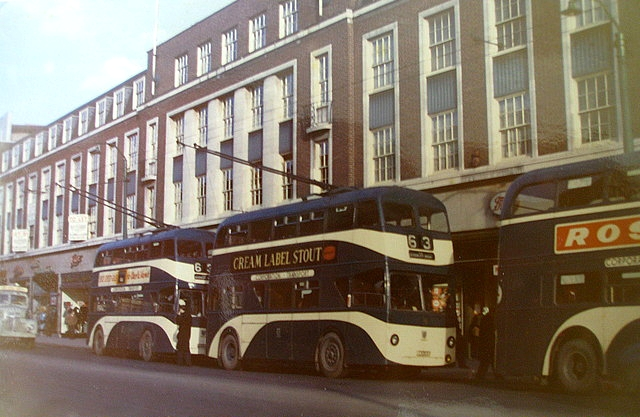
- Trolleybuses in King Edward Street, Hull

Operation
- Locale: Kingston upon Hull, East Riding of Yorkshire, England
- Open: 1937
- Close: 1964
- Status: Closed
- Routes: 7
- Operator: Hull Corporation

Infrastructure
- Electrification: (?) V DC parallel overhead lines
- Stock: 100 (maximum)

The Kingston upon Hull trolleybus system once served the city of Kingston upon Hull (usually referred to as Hull), in the East Riding of Yorkshire, England. Opened for service on 25 July 1937 (two days after a ceremonial inauguration), it gradually replaced the Hull tramway network.

By the standards of the various now-defunct trolleybus systems in the United Kingdom, the Hull system was a medium-sized one, with a total of 7 routes, and a maximum fleet of 100 trolleybuses. It was closed on 31 October 1964.

Hull's distinctively liveried trolleybuses played a role in the Philip Larkin poem, Here, which is set in Hull. None have survived.

== See also ==
- Transport in Kingston upon Hull
- List of trolleybus systems in the United Kingdom
