= Hull Fair =

European travelling funfair

Coordinates: 53.74871°N 0.37382°W

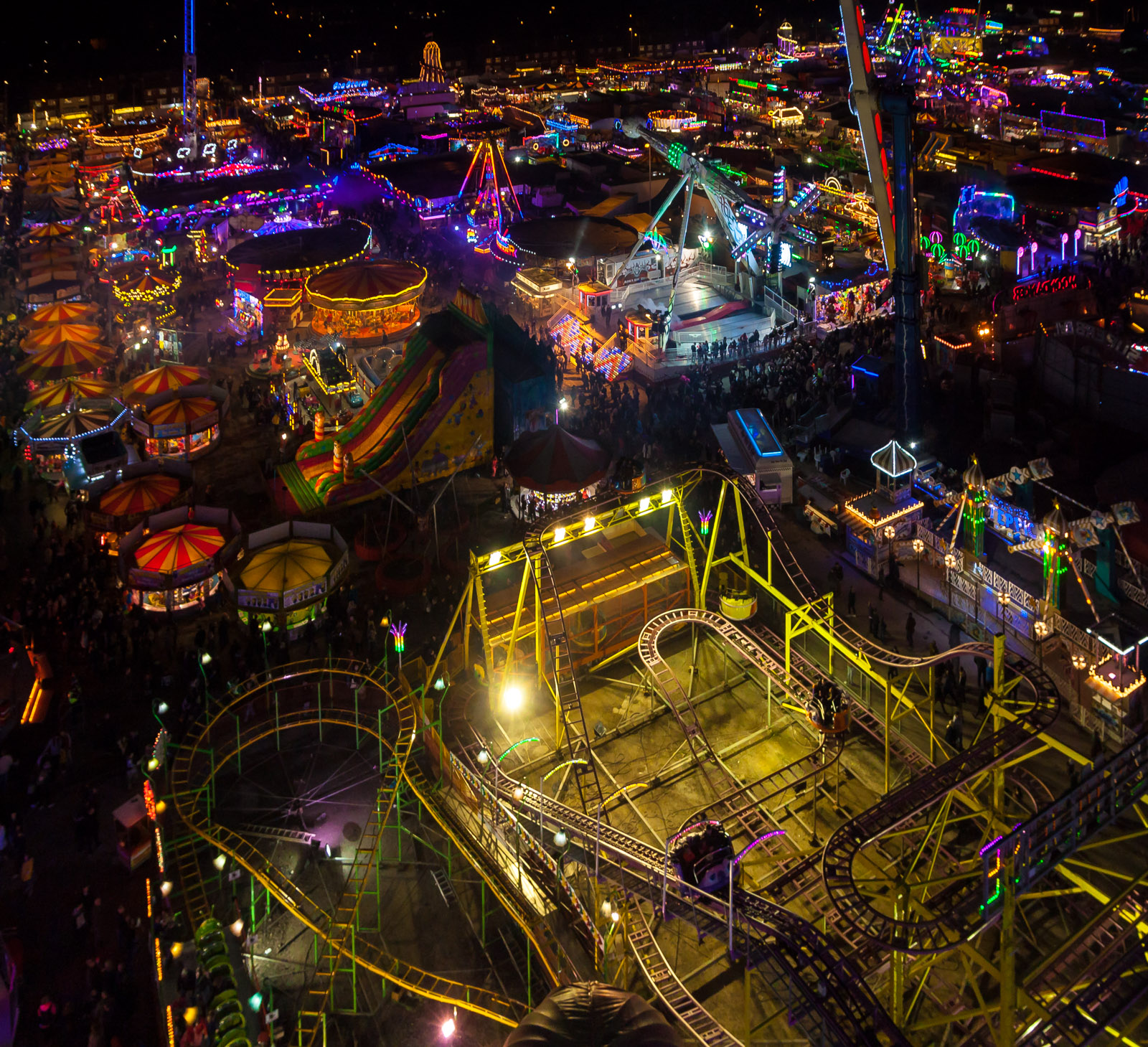
- Hull Fair, October 2015
- Genre: Fairground, funfair
- Locations: Walton Street, Kingston upon Hull, England
- Years active: 746–747 years
- Inaugurated: 1279 (Royal Charter)
- Most recent: 10 October 2025 – 18 October 2025
- Next event: 10 October 2026 – 18 October 2026
- Attendance: 800,000 (in 2019)
- Capacity: Unlimited (at police discretion)
- Organiser: Hull City Council
- Website: visithull.org/whatson/hull-fair-4/

Hull Fair is Europe's largest travelling funfair, which goes to Kingston upon Hull, England for one week from 5 pm on Friday to 11 pm of the Saturday eight days later, encompassing 11 October each year. The fair is open every day between these days except Sunday. Unlike small local fairs, Hull Fair attracts rides, attractions and travellers from a wide variety of different regions from around the country.

== History ==
Hull Fair received its first Royal Charter in 1279, although it had operated informally prior to that time.

The fair is one of the city's biggest traditions, as well as one of its oldest events. Carrying on with such tradition, the fair is opened by the Lord Mayor of Hull on the opening evening, normally at 5 pm.

Local tradition states that the changing of the calendar in 1751 led the locals to believe the loss of eleven days affected their fair. “Give us back our eleven days,” was the cry as an enraged mob charged around the streets of Hull, calling for the return of their eleven-day festivities which they believed to have been lost due to the calendar change. The outraged masses got their wish and from that year onwards 11 October, or the Friday nearest to it, became the official date for Hull Fair.

The fair is held on land on the east side of Walton Street, situated next to the MKM Stadium and the Tigers Trust Arena.

=== Cancellations ===
There was no fair from 1915 to 1918 due to the First World War. It was almost cancelled in 1938 due to the Munich Crisis, but went ahead. The Fair was not held between 1939 and 1945, for the duration of the Second World War, when the fairground was used as a mooring point for barrage balloons, a military vehicle park and a tank training ground. The Fair was cancelled in 2020 due to the COVID-19 pandemic. The fair returned in full under its established calendar in October 2021.

=== Incidents ===
In 2002 a 17-year-old student was seriously injured in a fall from the Bomber ride, after not being properly fastened into her seat. The incident resulted in the student suffering head and spinal injuries, two broken legs, as well as an injured hip and pelvis.

In 2008, the elastic cord of a reverse bungee ride broke whilst it was in use. Although people were on the ride when it happened, nobody suffered any injuries.

On 13 October 2017, a fault with the Power Tower ride at Hull Fair left more than thirty riders, aged between nine and 60, trapped about 70 ft (21m) in the air for five hours. Firefighters had to use an aerial platform to rescue those stuck, and it was the third time that the ride had broken down since the fair had opened that year. Riders were given blankets to keep them warm and got off at approximately midnight.

On 7 October 2019, a woman was flung from a ride, the Airmaxxx 360. The bar on her carriage failed and she was ejected from the ride, landing on a teenage boy and hitting another ride. She suffered non-life-threatening injuries to her face, abdomen, and leg, while the teenager suffered minor injuries to his foot. The two rides were taped off at the time of the incident and closed.
