= Tim O'Toole =

Tim O'Toole may refer to:

- Tim O'Toole (basketball), American basketball coach
- Tim O'Toole (businessman), chief executive of transport company FirstGroup
