= First Aberdeen =

Bus operator in Aberdeen, Scotland

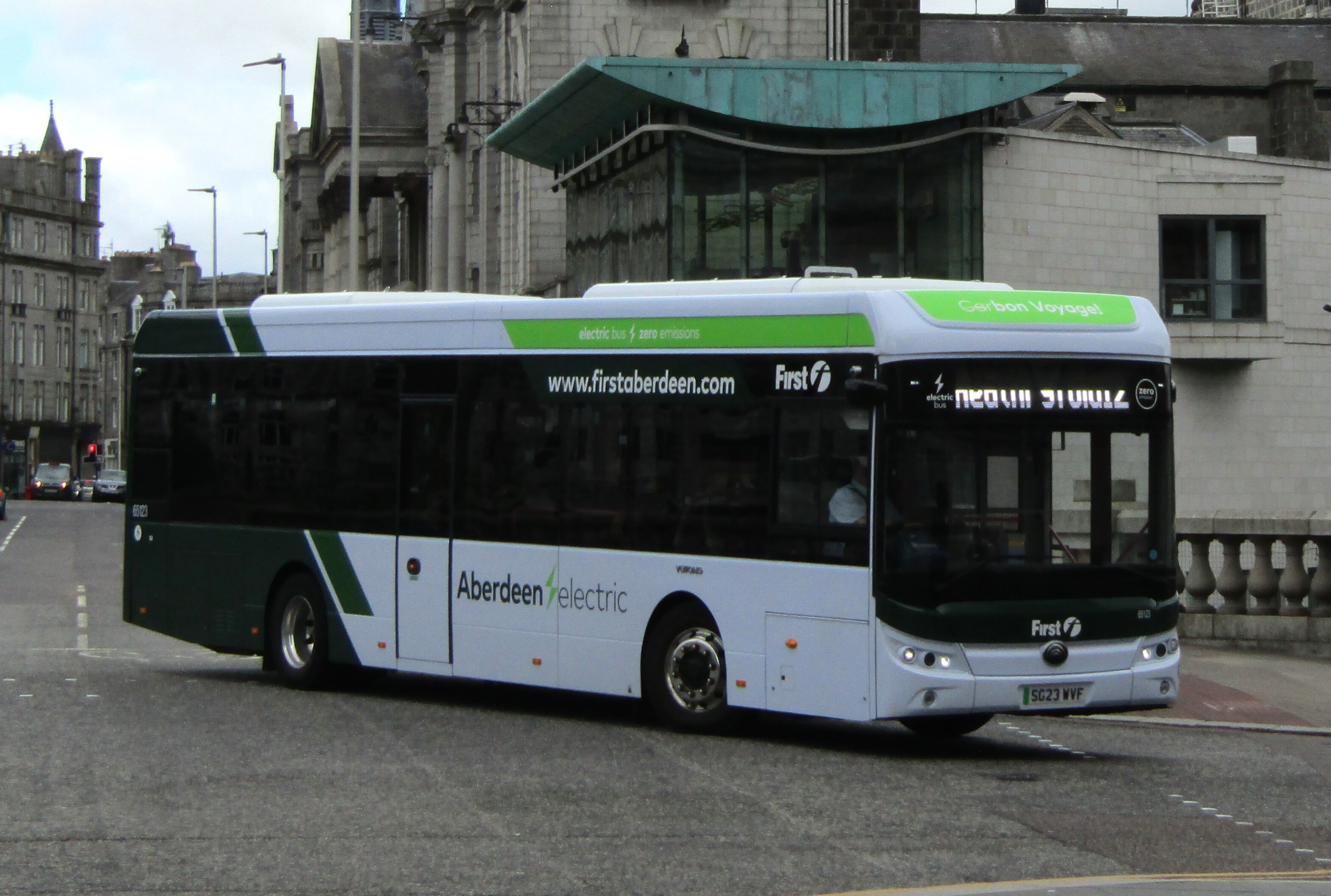
- Yutong E12 battery electric bus on Denburn Viaduct in June 2024
- Parent: FirstGroup
- Founded: 1986
- Headquarters: Aberdeen
- Service area: Aberdeen
- Service type: Bus services
- Routes: 23
- Fleet: 139 (November 2026)
- Website: www.firstbus.co.uk/aberdeen

First Aberdeen is the main bus operator in Aberdeen, Scotland. It is a subsidiary of FirstGroup.

== History ==
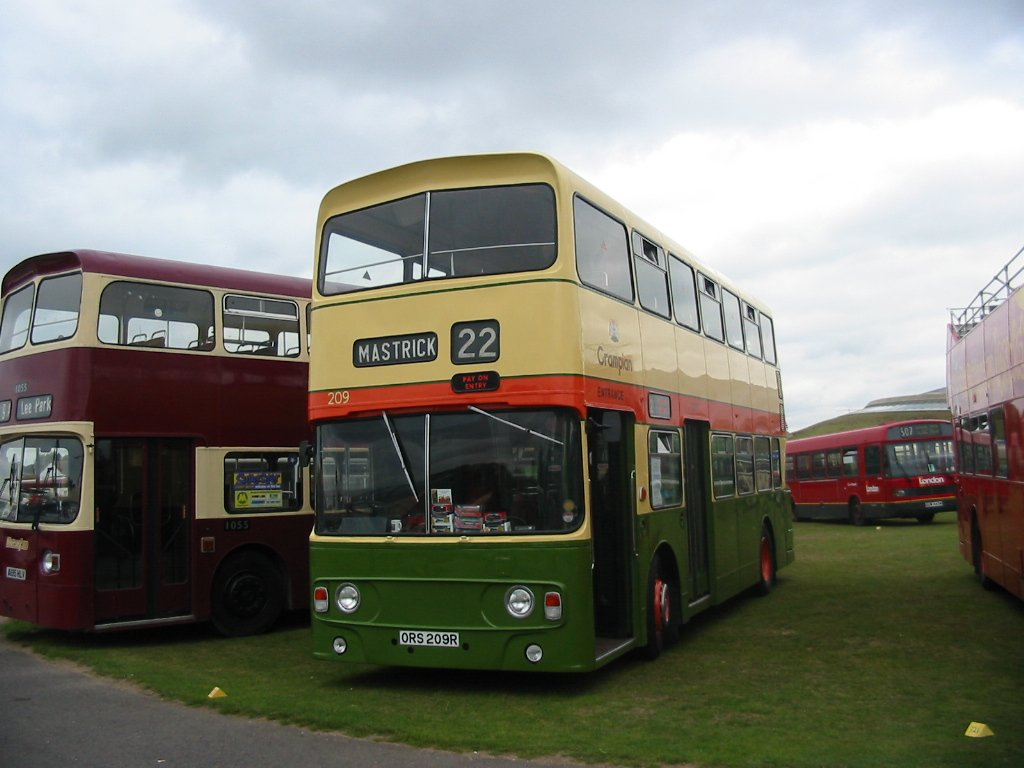
Preserved Alexander AL bodied Leyland Atlantean in Grampian Regional Transport livery

=== Aberdeen Corporation ===
Aberdeen Corporation Tramways was formed on 26 August 1898. The company was renamed Aberdeen Corporation Transport Department when it became solely a bus operator with trams ceasing on 3 May 1958.

=== Grampian Regional Transport ===
Under local government reorganisation in 1975, the Aberdeen Corporation bus operations transferred to Grampian Regional Transport, a department of the Grampian Regional Authority.

To comply with the Transport Act 1985, Grampian Regional Transport was incorporated in 1986, with the Grampian Regional Authority retaining ownership.

In January 1989 the company was privatised under an employee stock ownership plan led by its general manager Moir Lockhead. At the time GRT operated a fleet of 200 buses and 500 employees.

Unlike future similar sales in the UK, the sale of Grampian Regional Transport was done voluntarily by the council which had no overall majority party and had no deep rooted objection to the sale. At the time, councils could negotiate privately with single buyers, rather than the later practice of competitive bidding. It was a sale of a going concern, rather than as seen in other areas in later years, a distress sale, or a forced sale for political reasons.

=== First Grampian ===
While the company continued to operate as GRT in Aberdeen, its holding company GRT Bus Group expanded through acquisition purchasing six former nationalised bus companies in England and Scotland. In April 1994 GRT Bus Group became a public limited company. In April 1995 FirstBus was formed through the merger of the Badgerline and GRT Bus Groups, with fleets in England, Wales and Scotland. Aberdeen was selected as the headquarters.

In February 1998 Grampian Regional Transport was rebranded as First Aberdeen.

== Liveries ==
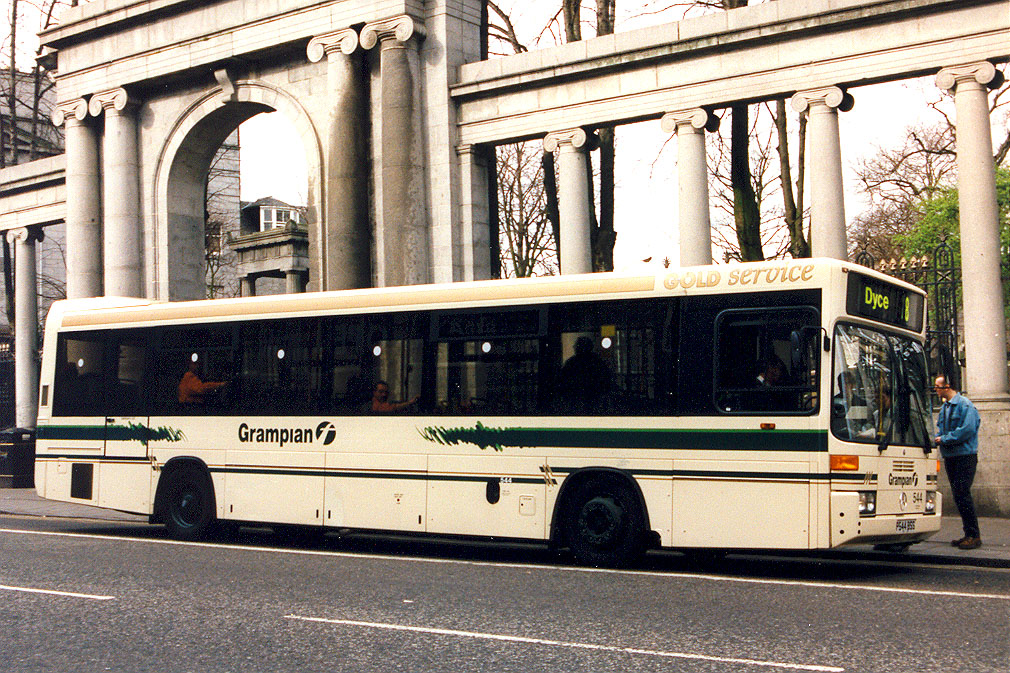
Optare Prisma bodied Mercedes-Benz O405 in Grampian Regional Transport livery on Union Street in March 1998

Aberdeen Corporation had a dark green and white livery, later becoming pea-green and cream. Council owned Grampian Regional Transport changed this livery, by removing the upper green band, replacing it with a thinner orange band, with Grampian fleetnames and a council crest. When privatised, a scheme with a larger area of cream base colour, supplemented by a two-tone green stripe pattern was adopted.

The cream base and stripe layout would become the corporate livery for the GRT Group, albeit with different colours for the stripes. The First Grampian livery consisted of the existing livery, with the fleetname changed to the FirstBus corporate style with the stylised f symbol. FirstGroup corporate livery was adopted in 1998 upon being rebranded as First Aberdeen.

== Fleet ==
As of November 2026 the First Aberdeen fleet consists of around 139 buses.

A mainstay of the Grampian Regional Transport fleet in the 1970s up to 1983 was the Alexander AL Type bodied Leyland Atlantean, supplemented by the Leyland National single-decker bus. In 1985 it moved to Alexander RH bodied Leyland Olympian double-deckers until 1988. From 1991 to 1997 the company steadily bought the Mercedes-Benz O405 single-decker.

Articulated buses

Grampian Regional Transport was one of the first UK users of articulated buses, taking delivery of a single 17.6 metres (58 ft) Alexander-bodied articulated Mercedes-Benz O405G in November 1992. Aberdeen was one of the major locations for articulated buses in the United Kingdom with around 35 in the fleet by December 2013. First Aberdeen's last articulated buses, a batch of Mercedes Citaro 0530Gs largely used on the 1 and 2 routes, were withdrawn in March 2025.

Single-deck buses

In August 2014, First Aberdeen took delivery of 26 Wright StreetLite micro-hybrid buses. The last of these buses had left the fleet by 2026, many moving to First Glasgow. First Aberdeen's only diesel single deckers in passenger use are a large fleet of around 46 Alexander Dennis Enviro 300s, some new to Aberdeen, some originally branded "Northern Lights" for the 17 and 18, and others new to First Glasgow and transferred second-hand.

Electric buses

24 Yutong E12 battery electric buses were delivered in July 2023 after some were briefly loaned to First Glasgow. 24 new Wright StreetDeck Electroliner and 12 electrically-repowered StreetDeck double-deckers delivered in March 2025.

=== Hydrogen buses ===
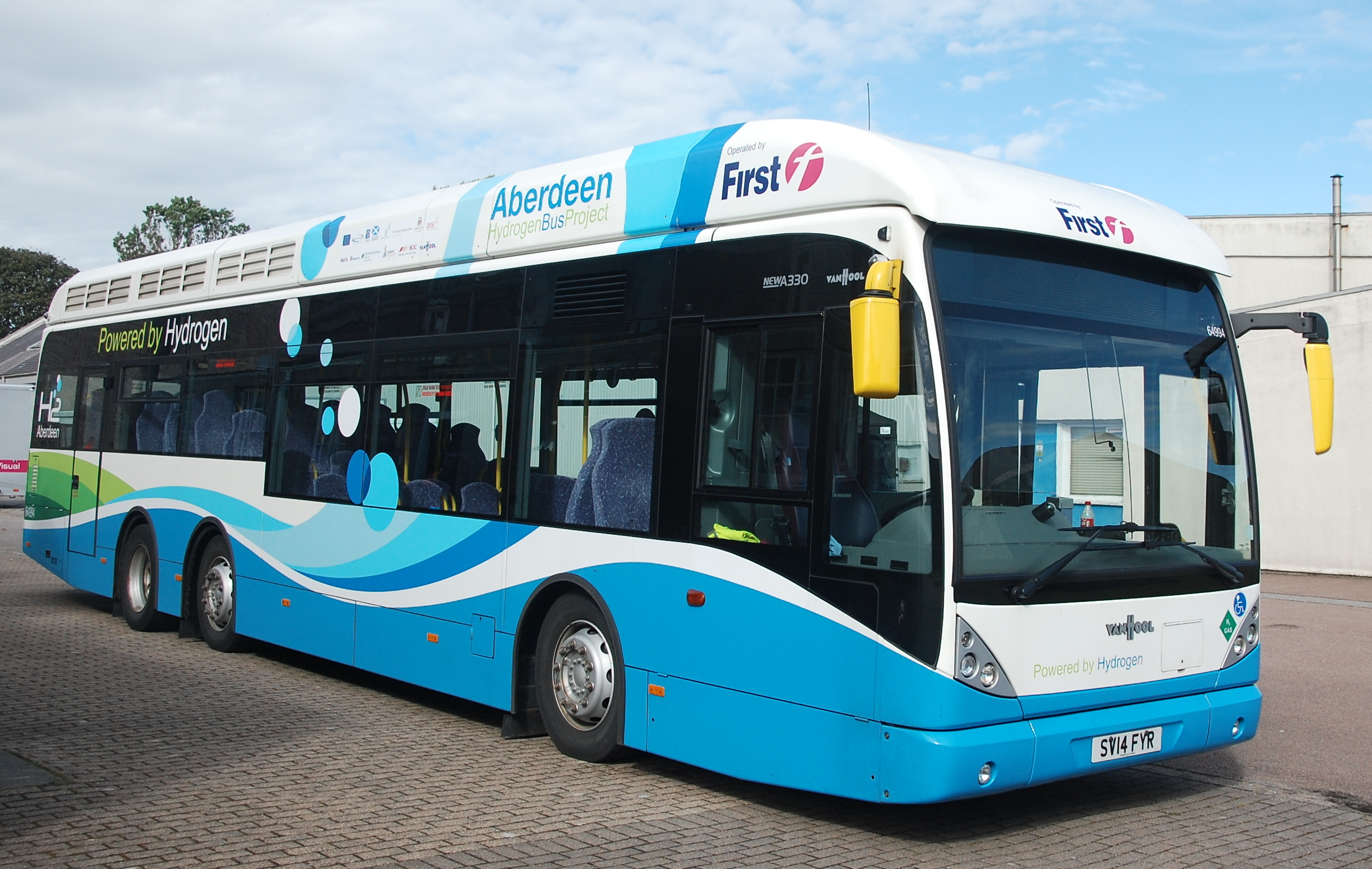
Van Hool A330 fuel cell bus at Gordon Barracks, Bridge of Don in September 2016

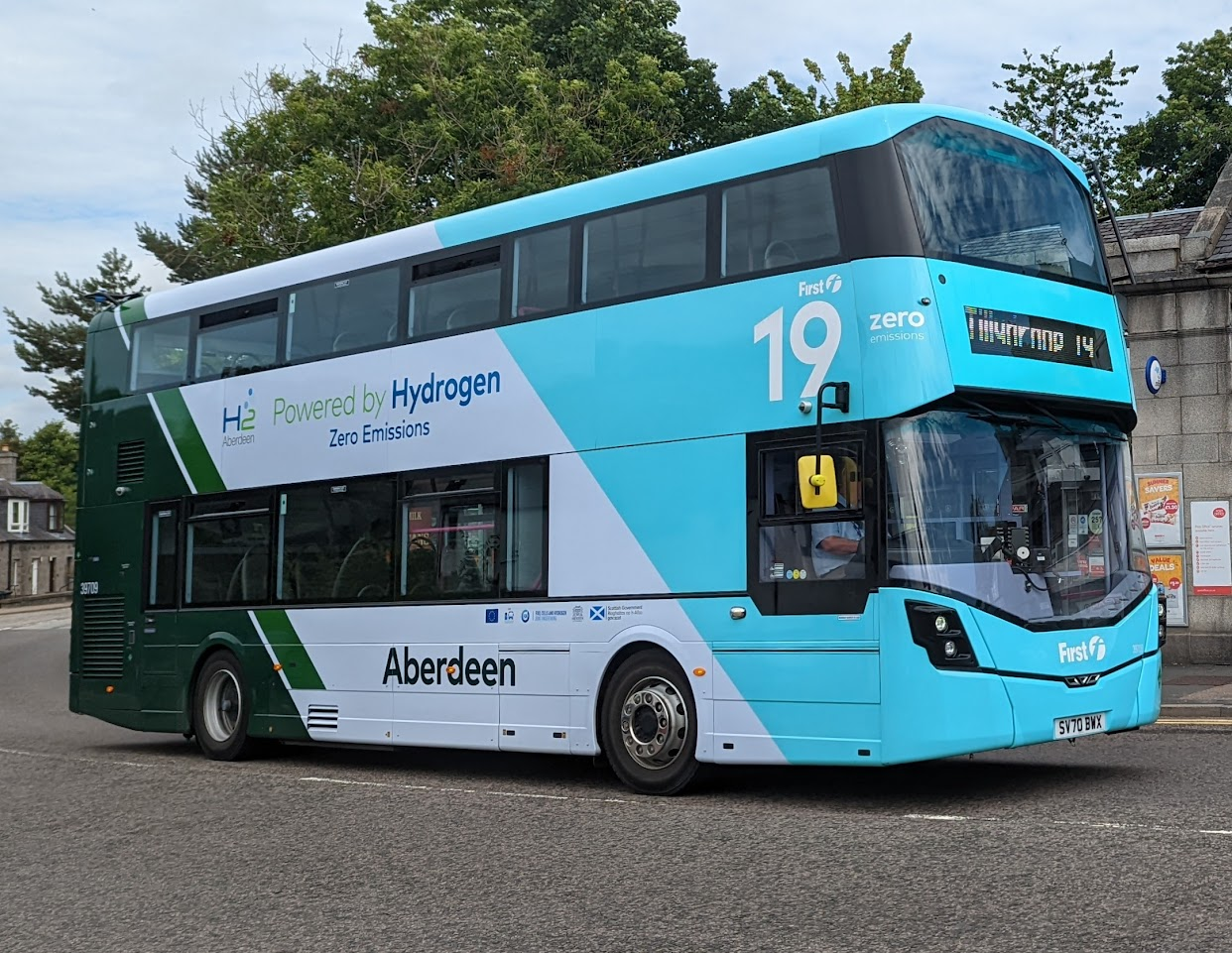
Wright StreetDeck Hydroliner double-decker fuel cell bus in Peterculter in July 2022

First Aberdeen were the world's first operator of double-decker hydrogen fuel cell buses, taking delivery of 15 Wright StreetDeck Hydroliners in late 2020. These were launched into service in January 2021, with most featuring turquoise front branding for route 19 from Peterculter toTillydrone via Aberdeen City Centre. Ten more joined the fleet in April 2022 featuring blue front branding for the 17/18 routes between Dyce and Fauld's Gate or Redmoss, bringing the total fleet of Hydroliners to 25. These buses are owned by Aberdeen City Council and leased to First Aberdeen, following on from a 'first phase' fleet of Van Hool A330 hydrogen single-deck buses purchased by the council and operated by both First Aberdeen and Stagecoach Bluebird between 2014 and 2020.

The first batch of StreetDeck Hydroliners were taken off the road in January 2022 due to a fault with a mounting bracket towards the rear of the bus, temporarily being replaced with Euro VI diesel buses loaned from First Glasgow. Following the replacement of the faulty bracket on each of the buses by Wrightbus, the buses began to return to service from April 2022. By July 2024, the entire Hydroliner fleet was being stored out of service at First Aberdeen's King Street depot due to a shortage in the supply of hydrogen fuel, shortly after fuel supplier BOC handed back the operations of a fuelling site in Kittybrewster to the City Council.

Despite a deal having been struck between the City Council and BP to support Aberdeen becoming a 'hydrogen hub', as a result of "significant advancements in electric vehicle technology" and an continuing lack of hydrogen fuel supply, in February 2026, First Aberdeen announced it was to withdraw its StreetDeck Hydroliners and hand them back to Aberdeen City Council for sale, instead pivoting towards further deliveries of battery electric buses.

However, in September 2026, First Aberdeen announced the purchase of 23 of the 25 Hydroliners at a heavily reduced price of £30,000 per bus. There are plans to electrically repower them and return them to service.

== King Street headquarters ==
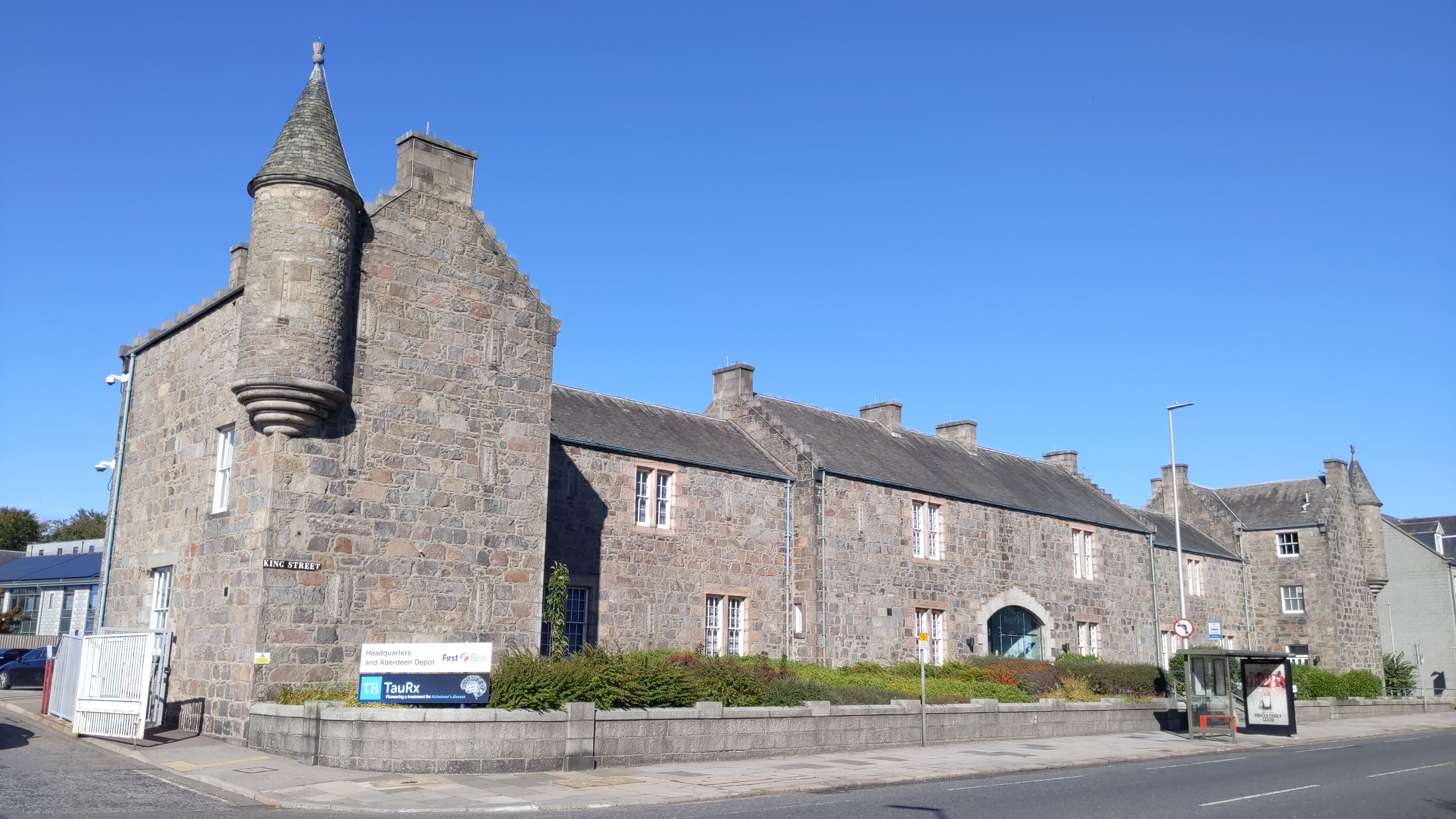
Headquarters of FirstGroup on King Street, Aberdeen

The company has occupied the King Street Barracks building at 395 King Street in the heart of the city since 1914. It was built in 1862 and bought by Aberdeen Corporation Tramways The site has also served as global headquarters of FirstGroup since its formation in 1995. On 21 June 2007, First gained permission to redevelop the site into a new Aberdeen bus depot and global FirstGroup headquarters building. It was officially opened by Anne, Princess Royal on 15 July 2010.

== Revenue ==
Most First Aberdeen services are operated commercially, with the exception being 5 council-subsidised weekend night routes. The company operates an exact fare policy, whereby no change is given by the driver. They allow contactless payment along with payment through the First Bus app on the Android and iOS mobile operating systems. The fleet was one of two divisions in FirstBus picked to trial the new "ticketer" ticket machines at the start of 2017.

== See also ==
- List of bus operators of the United Kingdom
- Transport in Aberdeen
