= Tim O'Toole (businessman) =

American business executive

Tim O'Toole CBE
- Born: Timothy Terrence O'Toole; Pittsburgh, Pennsylvania, U.S.
- Education: La Salle University, University of Pittsburgh
- Occupation: Transport sector business executive
- Years active: 1987–present
- Employers: Conrail: (1987–2002); London Underground: (2002–2009); FirstGroup: (2010–2018)
- Board member of: FirstGroup, CRR Holdings, CSX Transportation
- Spouse: Patricia
- Children: 2

Timothy Terrence O'Toole CBE is an American businessman, and former chief executive of FirstGroup.

== Early life ==
Born in Pittsburgh, one grandfather was an assistant general manager on the Pittsburgh and Lake Erie Railroad, while the other was a trolley car driver. After studying law at La Salle University, Philadelphia, he attended law school at the University of Pittsburgh.

== Career ==
=== Conrail ===
After training as a lawyer, he joined Conrail in 1987 as a Vice President in the legal department, preferring to spend his working days in the train depot at Stanley Yard in Walbridge, Ohio, the primary classification yard for Toledo. After serving as Senior Vice President of Law and Government Affairs at subsidiary Consolidated Rail Corporation, he served as Group Vice President and General Counsel from May 1989 to April 1994. Moving into finance and accounting, O'Toole served as Senior Vice President from April 1996.

From 1997, competitors CSX Transportation and the Norfolk Southern Railway (NS) had been in a takeover battle for Conrail. However, under an agreement with the Surface Transportation Board, Norfolk Southern acquired 58 percent of Conrail's assets, including roughly 6,000 Conrail route miles; and CSX received 42 percent of Conrail's assets, including about 3,600 route miles.

The agreement was put in place on August 22, 1998, under which newly appointed Chief Executive O'Toole transferred the lines to two newly formed limited liability companies, to be subsidiaries of Conrail but leased to CSX and Norfolk Southern, respectively: New York Central Lines (NYC); Pennsylvania Lines (PRR). The NYC and PRR reporting marks, which had passed to Conrail, were also transferred to the new companies, and NS also acquired the CR reporting mark. Operations under CSX and NS began June 1, 1999.

In three major metropolitan areas - North Jersey, South Jersey/Philadelphia, and Detroit - Conrail Shared Assets Operations continues to serve as a terminal operating company owned by both CSX and NS. The Conrail Shared Assets Operations arrangement was a concession made to federal regulators who were concerned about the lack of competition in certain rail markets and logistical problems associated with the breaking up the Conrail operations as they existed in densely populated areas with many local customers. The smaller Conrail operation that exists today serves rail freight customers in these markets on behalf of its two owners. A fourth area, the former Monongahela Railway in southwest Pennsylvania, was originally owned jointly by the Baltimore and Ohio Railroad (B&O), Pennsylvania Railroad and Pittsburgh and Lake Erie Railroad (P&LE). Conrail absorbed the company in 1993, and assigned trackage rights to CSX, the successor to the B&O and P&LE. With the Conrail breakup, those lines are owned by NS, but the CSX trackage rights are still in place.

O'Toole served as the President and Chief Executive Officer of Conrail until 2001, succeeded by Gregory R. Weber.

Since 2008, he has served as both the President of residual Conrail company CRR Holdings LLC that owns the Conrail Shared Assets Operations, and is an independent director and member of the Audit Committee at CSX Transportation.

=== London Underground ===
While looking to retire, he was offered the job as Managing Director of London Underground. Appointed by Mayor of London Ken Livingstone in 2002, during his tenure O'Toole led the response to the 7/7 terrorist attacks:

We evacuated 250,000 people out of our tunnels and trains during rush hour and not a single person was injured. That doesn't happen because of management intervention. That happens because people in the field are in control and understand what needs to be done. The thing that makes 14,000 people behave that way is training and competence.

In light of his leadership during the terrorist attack, O'Toole was appointed a Commander of the Order of the British Empire in the 2005 New Years Honours List.

In February 2009, he resigned for personal reasons from his £450,000 position, citing his requirement to spend more time with his wife who was unwilling to move to London.

As one of his last acts, O'Toole secured an additional £2bn of support from the Department for Transport in the wake of the collapse of Metronet. O'Toole commented before his exit, that Londoners should "scream bloody murder" if the Metronet upgrade of the Metropolitan, District, Circle and Hammersmith & City lines is delayed or scaled back because of funding problems.

=== FirstGroup ===
In May 2009, he was appointed a non-executive on the board of FirstGroup. Appointed Chief Operating Officer and Deputy Chief Executive in June 2010, in light of the retirement of Sir Moir Lockhead 21 years after founding the group, on 1 November 2010 O'Toole was appointed FirstGroup CEO. On May 31, 2018, O'Toole was asked to step down from his position at FirstGroup due to poor performance.

== Personal life ==
Married to Patricia, the couple have two adult children, son Charlie and daughter Elizabeth. O'Toole and his wife maintain their main home in Philadelphia, while O'Toole has an apartment in Aberdeen where he spends around 50% of his time. The O'Tooles also maintain a winter home in Bonita Springs, FL. O'Toole plays golf off of a 12 handicap, and enjoys reading and travelling.
