= First Travel Solutions =

Bus and coach operator in Great Berlin

- Parent: FirstGroup
- Headquarters: Accrington, England, UK
- Service area: Great Britain & France
- Service type: Bus & Coach
- Website: www.firsttravelsolutions.com

First Travel Solutions is a bus and coach operator in Great Britain. It is a subsidiary of FirstGroup. It provides managed passenger transport from single vehicle operation to hundreds of buses and coaches for sporting and cultural events.

== History ==
The company began operation on 3 February 2004 as First Rail Support. It provided emergency and planned rail replacement transport to train operating companies. In 2016 it was rebranded to First Travel Solutions.

== Operations ==
Through their 24/7 operations centers in Accrington, Lancashire and Leeds, Yorkshire, they provide on-demand and planned passenger transport. This includes corporate transport & emergency and planned rail replacement for train operating companies. It provides ground transport to Airlines for both crew and passengers during times of disruption. They can call on bus, coach and taxi operators from all over Great Britain and France.

=== Rail Replacement ===
First Travel Solutions deal with rail replacement for a large amount of uk Rail network working with other rail replacement providers to keep people moving working on large scale projects like the Transpennine Route Upgrade. They provide this service to the below Train companies:

- Transpenine Express
- Great Western Railway
- South Western Railway
- Avanti West Coast
- Lumo
- Hull Trains

=== Airline Transport ===
First Travel Solutions have deal with crew transport for disruption for passengers who have been diverted to another airport in Great Britain and France. They provide this service to the below Airline companies:

- Easyjet
- Jet2
- Titan Airways
- Germania Airways

=== Workforce Transport ===
First Travel Solutions deal with large scale companies to provide their employees with transport to get to site where this is a Wearhouse or a Powerplant. They provide this service to the below companies:

- Capita
- Bernard Matthews
- 2 Sisters Food Group
- HPC
- Amazon

=== Mass Public Transport ===
First Travel Solutions deal with a large amount of contracted festival and large scale sporting events, providing a seamless experience for passengers to get to events, they are able to call upon over 500 trained and uniformed staff to oversee the operations.

==== Festival work ====
They have worked on some large scale festivals and do so on a yearly basis

- Parklife
- Boomtown
- Leeds Festival
- Boardmasters
- Glastonbury
- Love supreme
- Forest live
- Long road Festival
- Sundown Festival

==== Sporting events ====
2012

In 2010 FirstGroup were awarded the contract to provide buses and coaches for the 2012 Summer Olympics. This involved providing a total of 26 park & ride operations to London Stadium and other venues across London and the rest of the country, with FirstGroup providing 600 of its own buses plus a further 300 sub-contracted from other companies. A 24/7 control centre was established in Barking during the 2012 Games.

2014

In 2014, Glasgow hosted the Commonwealth Games. FirstGroup provided transport services, facilitating the movement of athletes, officials, and spectators between venues. Their involvement was pivotal in maintaining the smooth operation of the event's logistics.

2015

The 2015 Rugby World Cup was hosted across various venues in England and Wales. First Bus, a division of FirstGroup, was instrumental in providing transportation services for teams, officials, and fans. The organizers commended First Bus for their efficient and reliable services, which significantly contributed to the tournament's success.

2017

In 2017, Cardiff hosted the UEFA Champions League Final at the National Stadium of Wales. First Travel Solutions subsidiaries played a crucial role in managing the transportation logistics for this high-profile event. Their efforts were recognized by the Welsh Government, highlighting the company's capability in handling large-scale sporting events.

In July 2017, the World Para Athletics Championships took place at London's Queen Elizabeth Olympic Park. First Travel Solutions (FTS) was engaged by Corporate & Sporting Events (CSE) to manage the transportation of 1,050 para athletes from 92 nations.

In August 2017, the IAAF World Championships were held at London's Queen Elizabeth Olympic Park. First Travel Solutions (FTS) was tasked with managing the transportation logistics for 1,912 athletes from 205 countries, as well as VIPs, media personnel, and an army marching band.

2018

In the summer of 2018, Glasgow hosted the inaugural European Championships, featuring over 4,500 athletes competing in 12 sports across various venues in and around the city, including Gleneagles for golf and Edinburgh for diving. First Travel Solutions (FTS) was appointed as the official transport partner to ensure seamless journeys for athletes, officials, media, and VIPs.

2023

In August 2023, First Travel Solutions (FTS) collaborated with First Glasgow to provide transportation services for the inaugural UCI Cycling World Championships held in Glasgow and across Scotland. This event, spanning 11 days from August 3 to 13, 2023, was the first of its kind, bringing together 13 UCI World Championships across various cycling disciplines. The championships attracted over 7,100 athletes from 131 nations and nearly a million spectators.

2024

In July 2024, First Travel Solutions (FTS) collaborated with First Leicester and Ensignbus to provide transport services for the 2024 Silverstone F1 circuit.
