= King Street Barracks =

Building in Aberdeen, Scotland

- Aberdeen, Scotland
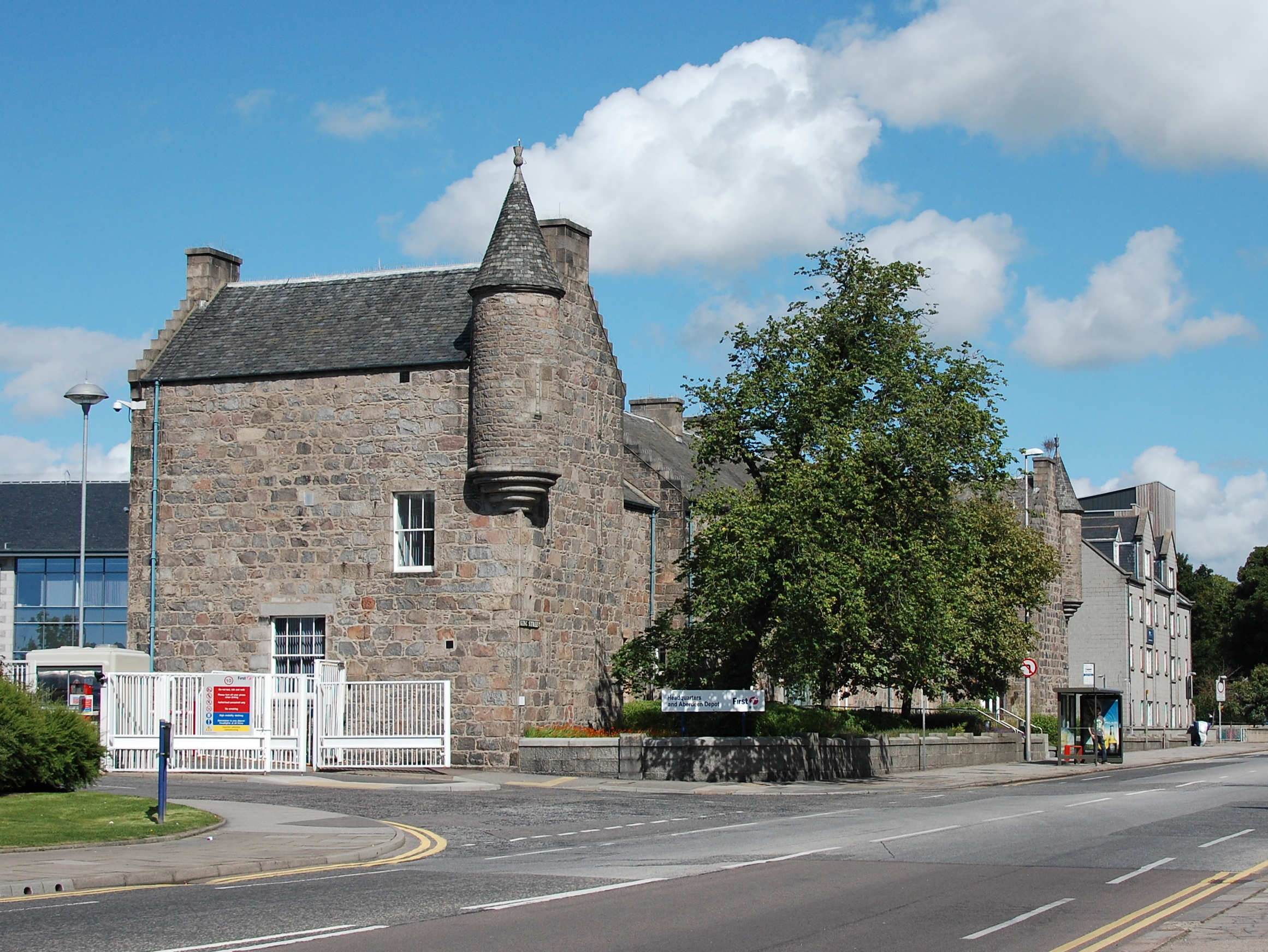
- King Street Barracks

Site information
- Type: Militia Barracks

Location
- Location within Aberdeen
- Coordinates: 57.1572°N 2.0964°W

Site history
- Built: 1863
- Built for: War Office
- In use: 1863-Present

The King Street Barracks is a former military installation in Aberdeen, Scotland. It is a Category C listed building.

== History ==
The building, which was designed by William Ramage in the Scottish baronial style as a militia barracks, was completed in 1863. It was first used by the Royal Aberdeenshire Highlanders in 1862. It was enlarged in 1880 and the Royal Aberdeenshire Highlanders evolved to become the 3rd Battalion, the Gordon Highlanders in 1881. After training moved to Fort George, the site was decommissioned by the army and acquired by Aberdeen Corporation Tramways in 1914. Following the privatisation of Grampian Regional Transport in 1989 and the formation of FirstBus in 1995, the site became the head office of FirstGroup.
