= DSB Øresund =

- Type: Limited company
- Industry: Public transport
- Genre: Rail transport
- Predecessor: DSBFirst Denmark
- Founded: 2012
- Defunct: 2015
- Headquarters: Copenhagen, Denmark
- Area served: The Coastal Line
- Services: Train operating company
- Revenue: 800 mio. kr. (2013)
- Net income: 22 mio. kr. (2013)
- Parent: DSB
- Website: http://www.dsboresund.dk

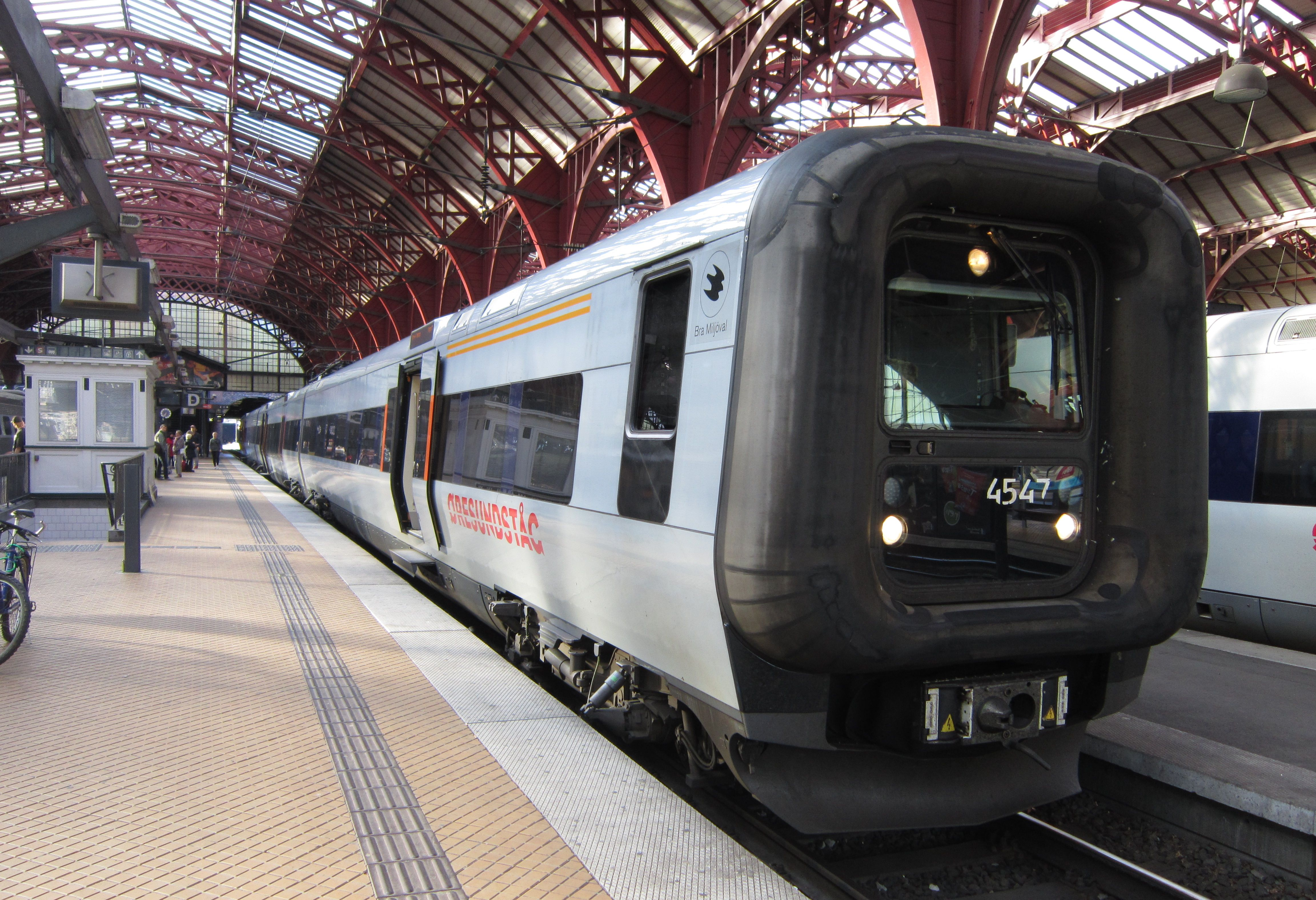
One of the 105 Oresundtrains operated by DSB Øresund in cooperation with Transdev

DSB Øresund was a Danish railway company which was the successor of what was left of DSBFirst Denmark. DSB Øresund operated train services on the tendered Coast Line and half of the train services between Copenhagen Central Station and Malmö via the Øresund Bridge. The other half of the cross-border service was operated by Transdev. On 13 December 2015, DSB took over operation of all activities from DSB Øresund A/S.
