= DSBFirst =

Danish & Swedish train operating company

- Type: Joint venture
- Industry: Rail transport
- Founded: 2008
- Headquarters: Copenhagen, Denmark
- Key people: Carsten Røn Andersen
- Revenue: DKK 7 million (2012)
- Net income: DKK 752 million (2012)
- Parent: DSB; FirstGroup
- Website: www.dsbfirst.dk

DSBFirst operated rail franchises in Denmark and Sweden. It was a joint venture between DSB andFirstGroup. FirstGroup had a 25% shareholding in DSBFirst Denmark and 20% in DSBFirst Sweden and DSBFirst Väst. By March 2011 FirstGroup's shareholding in the Swedish divisions had increased to 30%.

== Divisions ==
=== DSBFirst Denmark ===
DSBFirst Denmark commerced operating the Upplands Lokaltrafik franchise in Denmark in June 2011. These services transferred to DSB Uppland in December 2011.

DSBFirst Denmark commerced operating the Oresundtrain franchise jointly with DSBFirst Sweden in January 2009. Oresundtrain services were operated from Helsingør and Nivå in Denmark along the Coast Line and over the Øresund Bridge to Malmö, Växjö, Kalmar, Karlskrona and Gothenburg in Sweden as well as extensive network of railways in Scania. The company continued to operate DSBFirst Denmark's services without FirstGroup's involvement under the name DSB Øresund after December 2011.

=== DSBFirst Sweden ===
DSBFirst Sweden ceased operating the Swedish part of the Oresundtrain franchise after difficulties encountered by Danish State Railways over cross subsidization and accounting irregularities. Services operated by DSBFirst Sweden transferred to Veolia Transport in December 2011.

=== DSBFirst Väst ===
Awarded the Västtrafik franchise from December 2010 to December 2018 for local services around Gothenburg in Sweden. Services operated by DSBFirst Väst continue to be operated without FirstGroup's involvement under the name DSB Sverige since 2011. Due to the bad economy, the franchise was later awarded to SJ subsidiary Götalandståg, who have been operating the Västtåg and commuter rail services since 30 June 2012.
