= GRT Group =

Former bus operating company in the United Kingdom

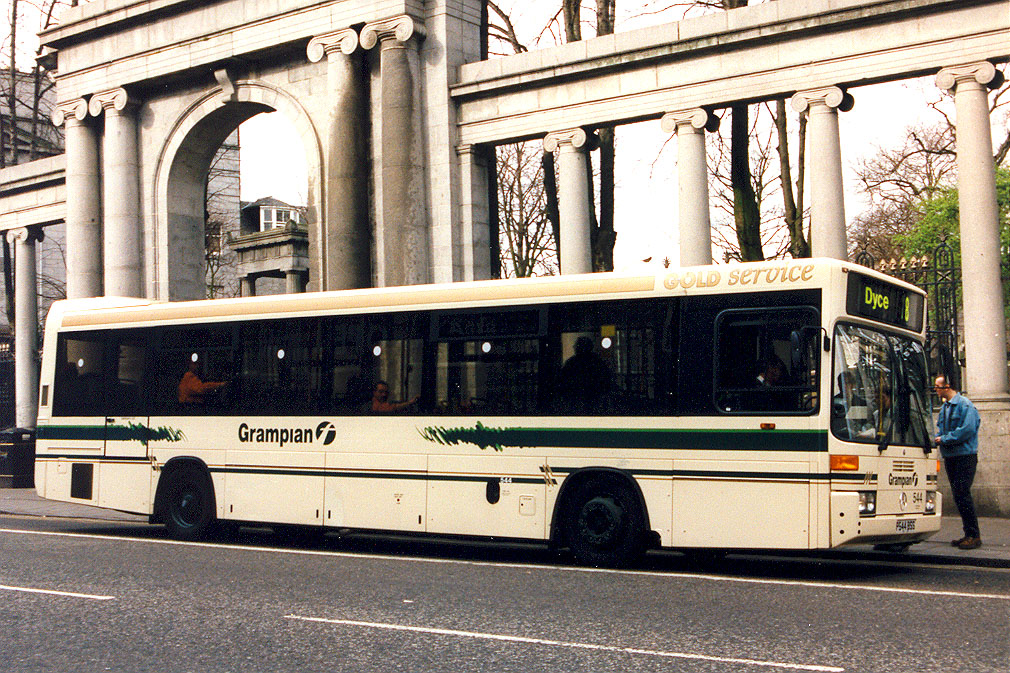
- First Aberdeen Optare Prisma bodied Mercedes-Benz O405 in March 1998
- Founded: January 1989
- Ceased operation: June 1995
- Headquarters: Aberdeen
- Service area: England; Scotland
- Service type: Bus operator
- Fleet: 1,600 (June 1995)
- Operator: Grampian Regional Transport; Midland Scottish; Northampton Transport; Leicester CityBus; Eastern Counties; Scottish Motor Group; Lowland Scottish
- Chief executive: Moir Lockhead

GRT Group was a bus operating company in the United Kingdom from 1989 until 1995. It was formed when Grampian Regional Transport (GRT) was privatised. It went on to purchase a number of bus companies in England and Scotland. In April 1994, GRT Group was listed on the stock exchange, and in June 1995 merged with Badgerline to form FirstBus.

== History ==
The GRT Group was formed as a holding company to purchase Grampian Regional Transport, the city bus operator in Aberdeen, Scotland, in a management buyout. Motivation for the buyout was the 1988 announcement that the Scottish Bus Group was to be privatised, sparking fears that GRT could be acquired by a larger group and asset stripped.

The buyout was achieved on 20 January 1989. General Manager Moir Lockhead, together with four other managers, took a 51% stake in the new company, with employees holding 33%, and Aberdeen Asset Management and 3i the remaining 16%. At the time GRT had a fleet of 200 buses and 500 employees.

GRT Group went on to purchase other bus operators in England and Scotland. In April 1994, it was listed on the Stock Exchange. In June 1995, GRT Group merged with Badgerline to form FirstBus. GRT Group contributed 1,600 buses to the new company's fleet of 5,600.

== Acquisitions ==
As GRT Holdings:

- Midland Scottish September 1990 (ex Scottish Bus Group)
- Northampton Transport October 1993 (ex Northampton Council)
- Leicester CityBus November 1993 (ex Leicester City Council)

As GRT Bus Group plc:

- Eastern Counties July 1994 (ex National Bus Company)
- Scottish Motor Traction October 1994 (ex Scottish Bus Group)
- Lowland Scottish November 1994 (ex Scottish Bus Group)

Midland Scottish, Eastern Counties, Scottish Motor Traction and Lowland Scottish, were regional companies, with operating territories stretching over large areas comprising town and interurban services. The Northampton and Leicester operations were town based networks, like Grampian.

== Livery ==
As GRT Group, the company had developed a form of corporate livery dictated by an arrangement of a horizontal and diagonal bands over a base colour. The colour scheme of the bands were derived from colours representative of the subsidiary company, while the base colour was chosen as cream. Lowland Scottish, however, opted to use yellow for its base colour. The companies retained their own version of a company logo. Some companies developed an alternate livery with a gold band for the introduction of new buses.

With the formation of FirstBus, the former GRT companies retained its corporate livery, with the individual company logos replaced with the company name in a new standard corporate typeface, along with a stylised f symbol representing FirstBus.
