= King Street, Aberdeen =

Street in Aberdeen, Scotland, United Kingdom

King Street
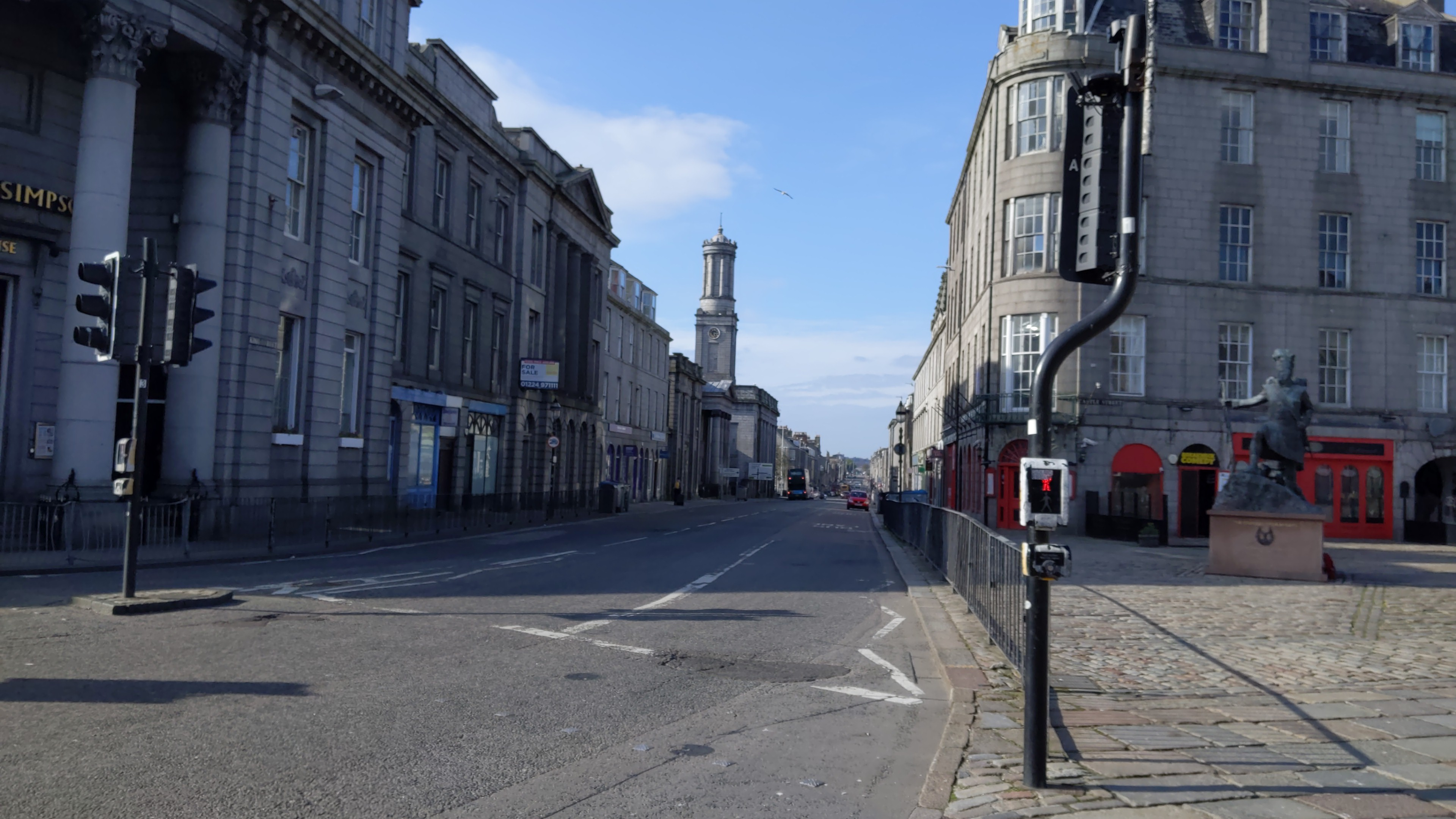
- The south end of King Street, pictured in 2023
- Interactive map of King Street
- Length: 1.9 mi (3.1 km)
- Postal code: AB24
- south end: Castle Street; 57.1481°N 2.0933°W
- north end: Ellon Road, Bridge of Don; 57.1764°N 2.0903°W

King Street is one of the main streets in the city of Aberdeen, Scotland.

== Route and landmarks ==
The street is designated the A956 for most of its length and is the principal northward access to the city centre from the suburb of Bridge of Don and the main A90 from Peterhead.

Its southern end is in the city centre and is also near the prestigious shopping street, Union Street. Heading northwards, the street skirts Old Aberdeen and the University of Aberdeen, eventually reaching a modern bridge over the River Don, which took over form the ancient Brig o' Balgownie, a short distance to the west.

The headquarters of FirstGroup is approximately halfway along the street and a short way to the east is Pittodrie Stadium, home of Aberdeen F.C.

The street also contains the Aberdeen Arts Centre on its junction with West North Street.
