= FirstGroup =

International transport group based in Aberdeen

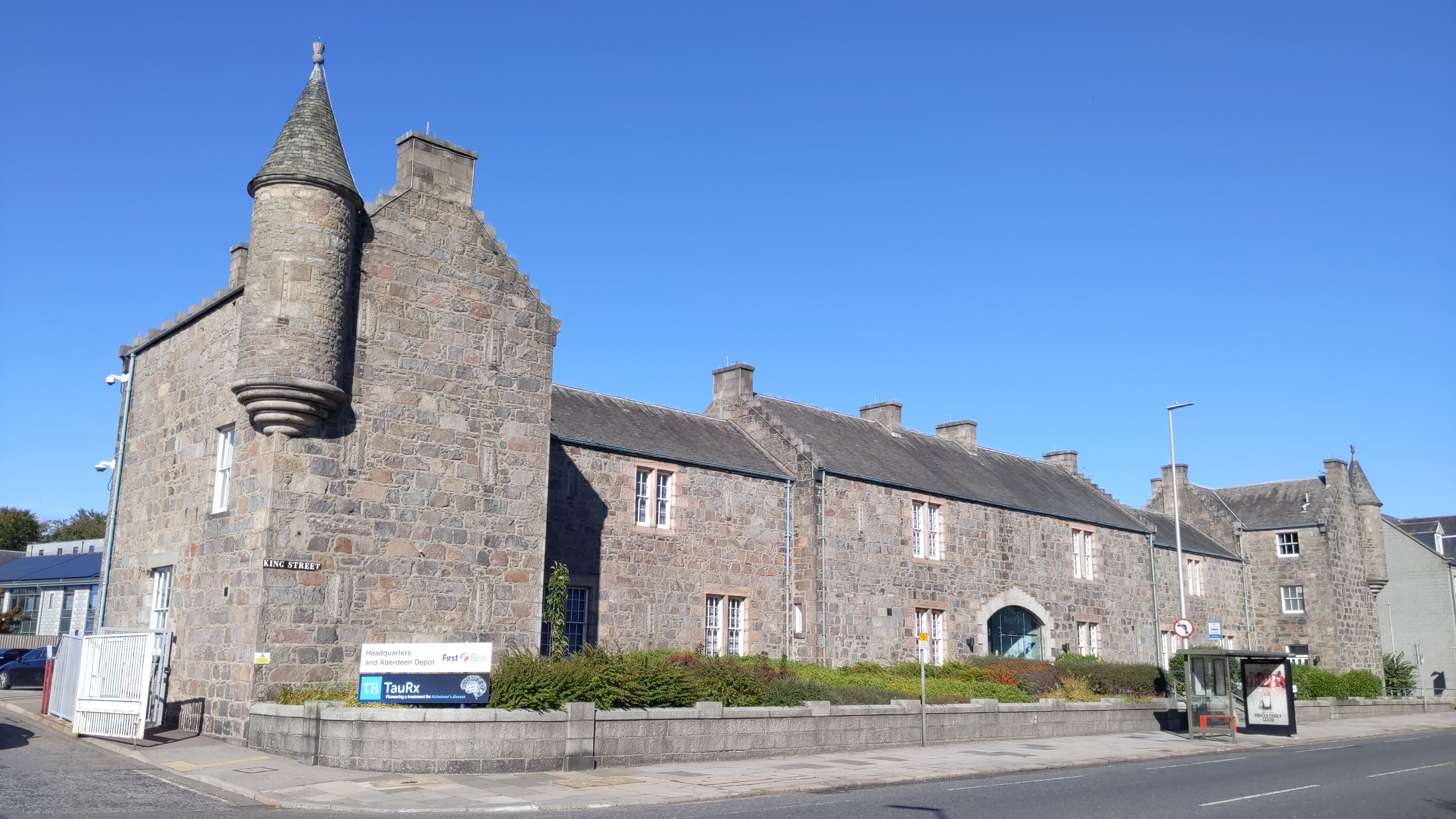
- The King Street Barracks building, in which FirstGroup is headquartered
- Type: Public
- Traded as: LSE: FGP; FTSE 250 component
- ISIN: GB0003452173
- Industry: Transport
- Founded: 1 April 1995
- Headquarters: Aberdeen, Scotland
- Area served: United Kingdom; Ireland
- Key people: Peter Lynas (acting chairman); Graham Sutherland (chief executive)
- Products: Bus, coach, rail & tram
- Revenue: ▼£4,751.9 million (2026)
- Operating income: ▼£219.4 million (2026)
- Net income: ▼£121.5 million (2026)
- Number of employees: 18,000 (2026)
- Subsidiaries: See below
- Website: www.firstgroupplc.com

FirstGroup plc is a British multi-national transport group, based in Aberdeen, Scotland. The company operates transport services in the United Kingdom and Ireland. It is listed on the London Stock Exchange and is a constituent of the FTSE 250 Index.

The creation of what became FirstGroup is closely tied to the deregulation of bus services in the United Kingdom during the 1980s. During April 1995, two acquisitive private bus operators, Badgerline and GRT Bus Group, merged to create FirstBus. The new company initially operated a fleet of 5,600 buses to provide services to numerous regions across England, Wales and Scotland. Throughout the late 1990s, FirstBus continued its policy of growth by acquisition. To this end, it acquired several former council owned operations and companies formerly owned by English, Welsh and Scottish nationalised operators.

During December 1997, the company was renamed FirstGroup to reflect its entry into Britain's recently privatised railways. Around this time, it had a 24.5% shareholding in Great Western Holdings that was awarded the Great Western and North Western franchises, as well as a 100% shareholding in First Great Eastern. FirstGroup made its first overseas foray in September 1998 via a 26% shareholding in the joint venture New World First Bus that provided bus services in Hong Kong. In September 1999, FirstGroup purchased the American company Ryder Public Transport Services. During May 2000, it began operating the London Tramlink concession. During August 2003, FirstGroup purchased GB Railways, which owned Anglia Railways and GB Railfreight and held 80% of the shares in Hull Trains.

In February 2007, FirstGroup agreed to buy the US-based bus operator Laidlaw, along with a controlling stake in Greyhound Lines, the largest bus operator in North America. During June 2009, FirstGroup made an unsuccessful takeover bid for rival transport operator National Express. In June 2010, FirstGroup sold its rail freight business First GBRf to the Eurotunnel Group, exiting the rail freight sector as a result. During October 2016, First Transit commenced operating the A-train, its first rail operation in the United States. In August 2017, FirstGroup's joint venture with MTR Corporation commenced operating the South Western franchise, which ended in 2025 following renationalisation. In May 2020, FirstGroup announced it would retain its UK bus operations and sell off its activities in North America. During June 2022, FirstGroup rejected a £1.2bn takeover offer from US private equity company I Squared Capital.

== History ==
=== Origins and early acquisitions ===
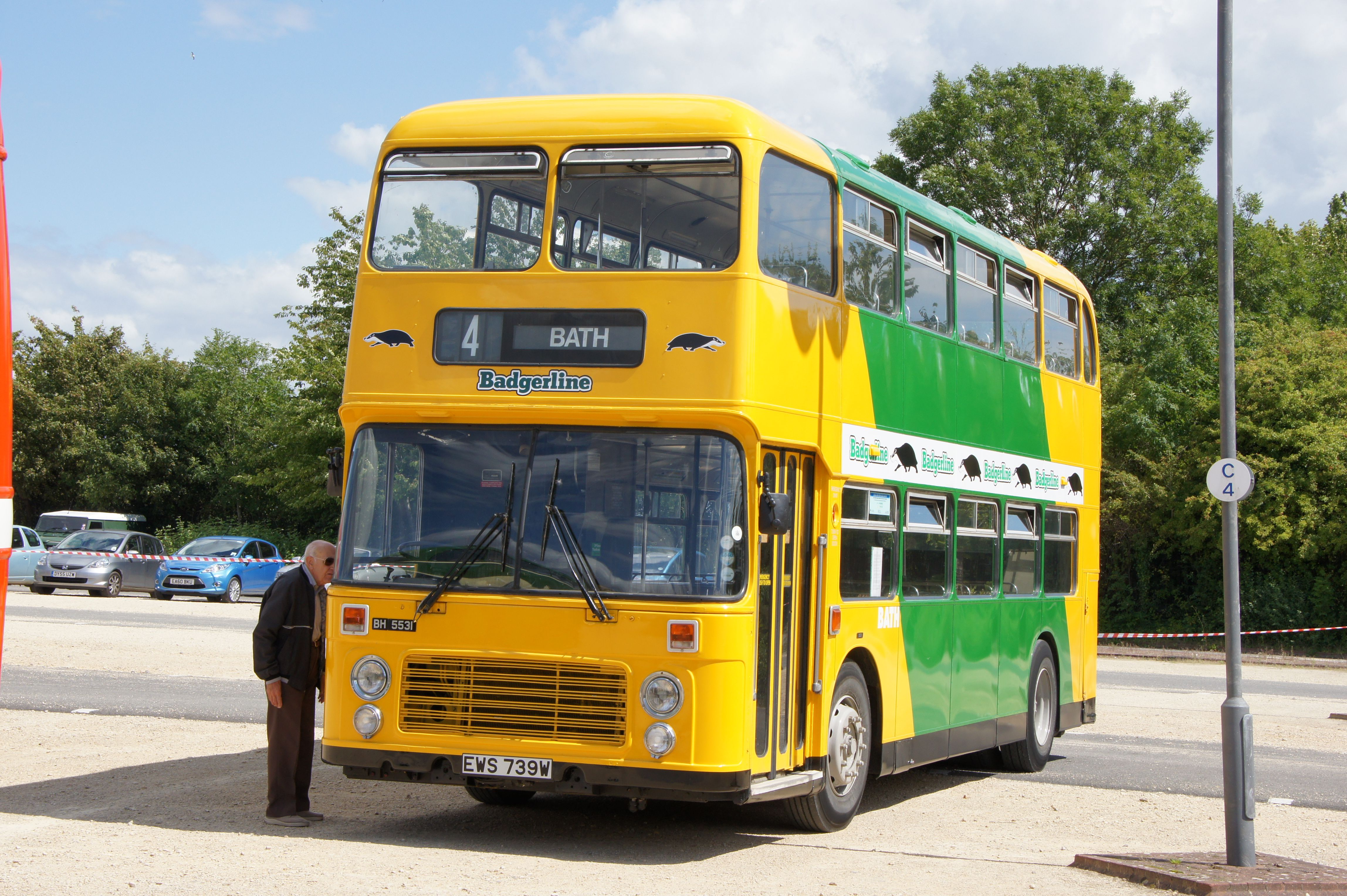
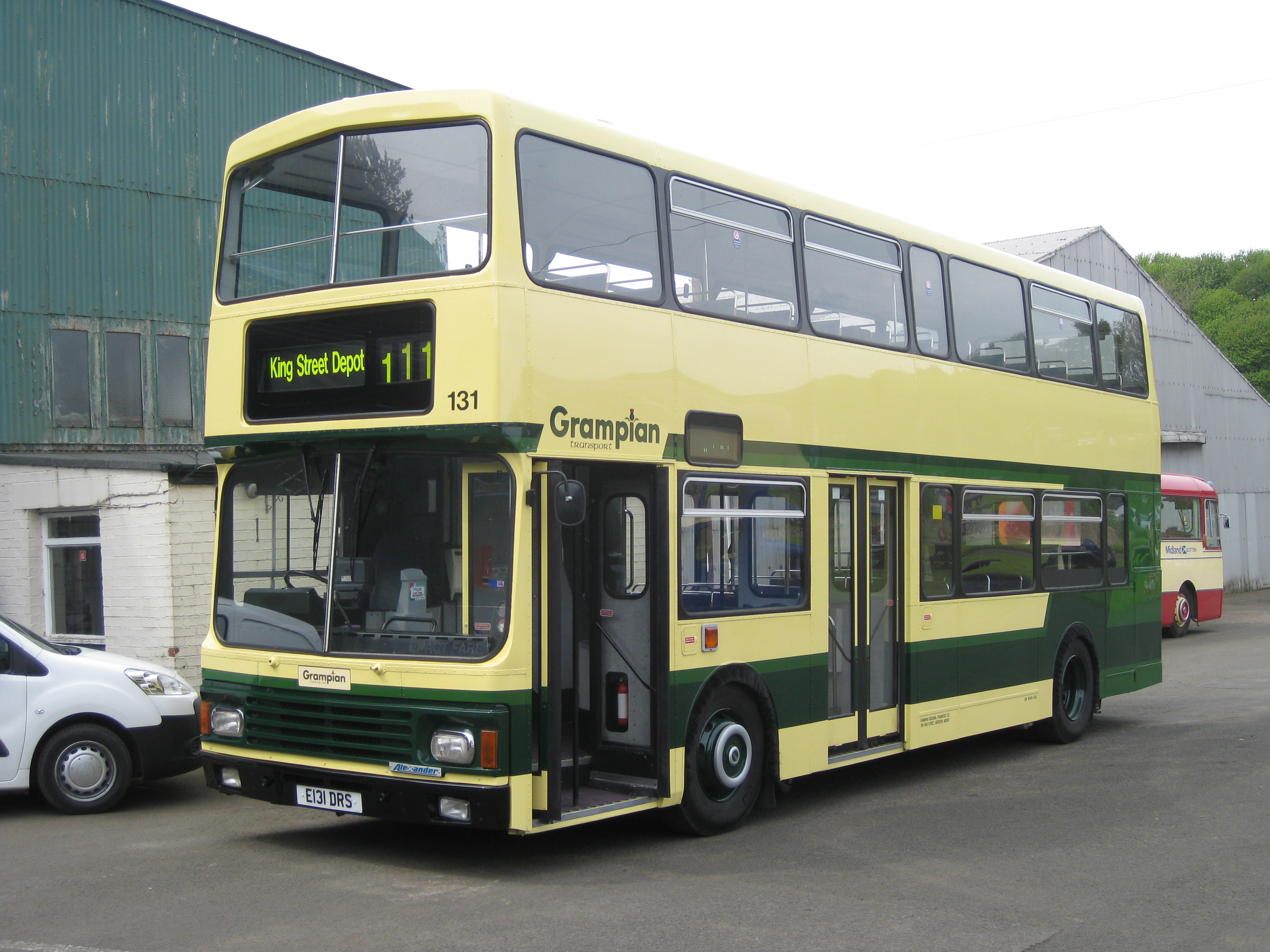
Preserved Badgerline and Grampian Regional Transport buses; these companies merged to form FirstBus in April 1995

FirstGroup originated within the deregulation of bus services in the United Kingdom in 1986, whereby private companies purchased nationalised and municipal bus operators. During September 1986, the Somerset based services of the Bristol Omnibus Company that were rebranded in 1985 as Badgerline were purchased in a management buyout. As Badgerline Group, it expanded through acquisition purchasing other formerly nationalised bus companies in England and Wales.

In January 1989, Grampian Regional Transport, the bus operator in Aberdeen owned by Grampian Regional Council, was privatised in a management buyout led by its then general manager, Moir Lockhead. As GRT Bus Group, it expanded through acquisition purchasing six former nationalised bus companies in England and Scotland. During April 1995, FirstBus was formed through the merger of the Badgerline and GRT Bus Groups, with fleets in England, Wales and Scotland. The former King Street Barracks site in Aberdeen was selected as the headquarters. At the time of the merger, FirstBus had 5,600 buses, 4,000 of which came from Badgerline. Badgerline's Trevor Smallwood became chairman of FirstBus, while GRT head Moir Lockhead became deputy chairman and chief executive.

Throughout the late 1990s, FirstBus continued its policy of growth by acquisition. To this end, it acquired several former council owned operations and companies formerly owned by English, Welsh and Scottish nationalised operators. FirstBus went on to acquire larger urban metropolitan operators by taking advantage of the privatisation of the PTE bus operations and the privatisation of London bus services. FirstBus acquired GM Buses North in Manchester and Strathclyde Buses in Glasgow in 1996, Mainline in South Yorkshire and CentreWest in London in 1997, and Capital Citybus in London in 1998.

=== FirstGroup and expansion ===
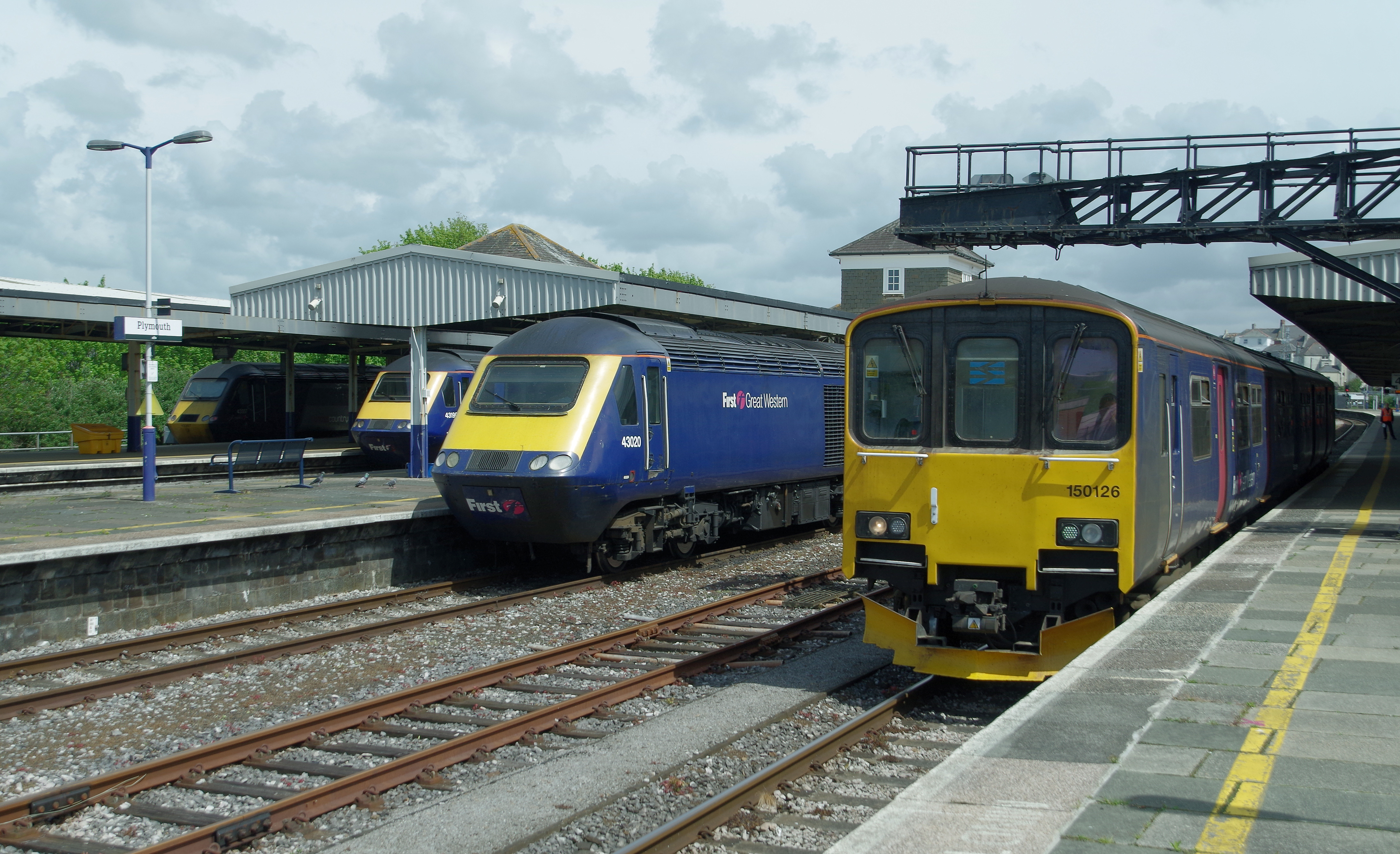
A line-up of First Great Western trains at Plymouth in 2018

During November 1997, the company was renamed FirstGroup. This change was due to the company's entry in February 1996 into Britain's recently privatised railways, having a 24.5% shareholding in Great Western Holdings that won the Great Western and North Western franchises, and a 100% shareholding in First Great Eastern that ran the Great Eastern franchise from January 1997. In March 1998, FirstGroup purchased the 75.5% shares in Great Western Holdings that it did not already own and rebranded the franchises First Great Western and First North Western.

In September 1998, FirstGroup made its first overseas foray when New World First Bus commenced operating bus services in Hong Kong formerly operated by China Motor Bus; the company held a 26% shareholding in the joint venture. During May 2000, FirstGroup sold its shares to joint venture partner New World Development. In September 1999, FirstGroup purchased Ryder Public Transport Services, a provider of school bus and contracted public bus transportation in the United States. In May 2000, FirstGroup began operating the London Tramlink concession under contract to Transport for London.

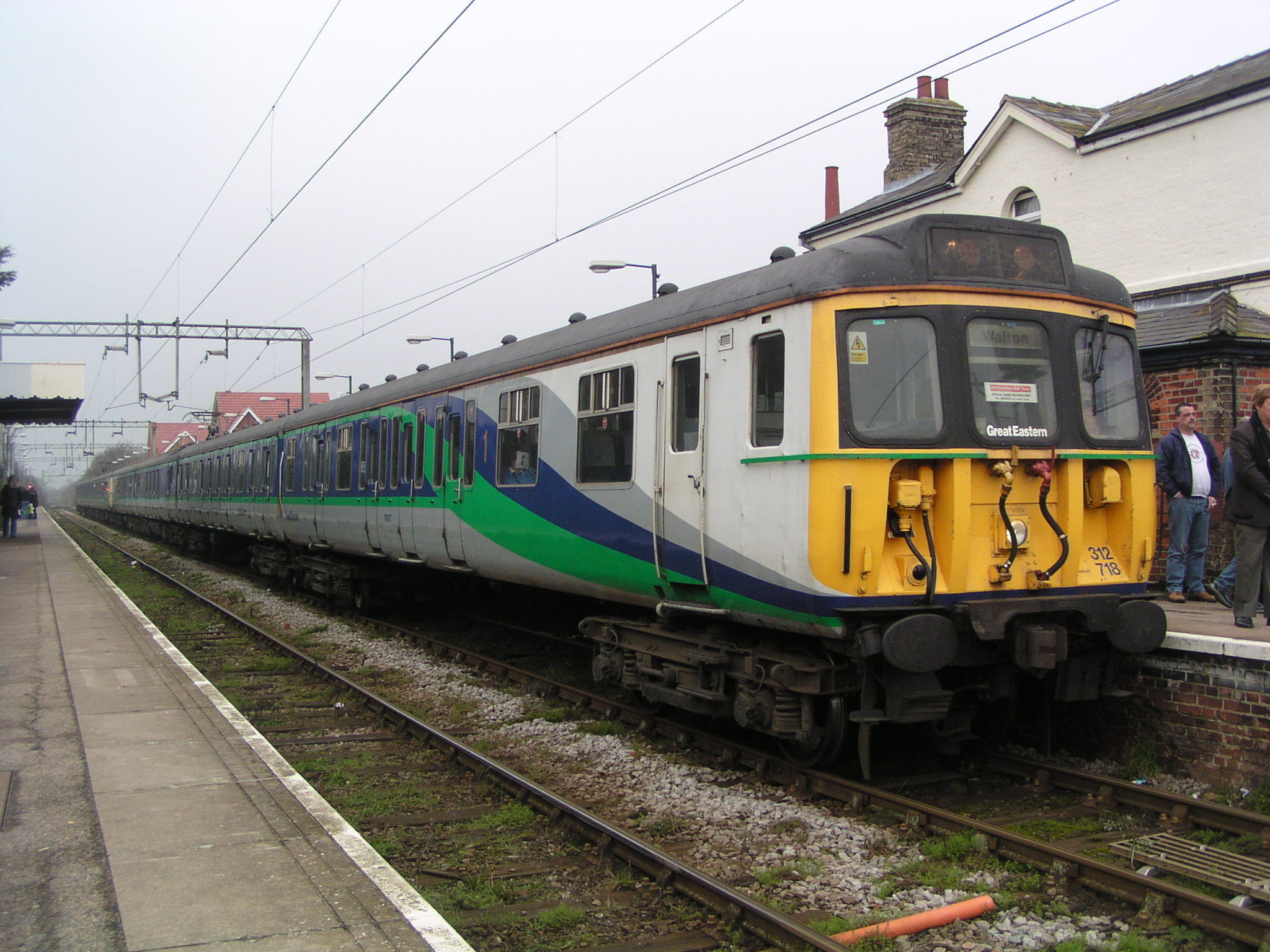
First Great Eastern Class 312 at Kirby Cross in March 2004

In November 2001, FirstGroup was again renamed to simply First, adopting a unified brand with buses and trains being repainted into respective corporate liveries. During August 2003, FirstGroup purchased GB Railways, which owned Anglia Railways and GB Railfreight and held 80% of the shares in Hull Trains. Having not been shortlisted for the Greater Anglia franchise, this outcome gave FirstGroup another chance to bid. However, it too was unsuccessful and the franchise was awarded to the rival transport company National Express from April 2004, including the services operated by First Great Eastern. In November 2003, FirstGroup purchased a 90% shareholding in Irish coach operator Aircoach.

In February 2004, FirstGroup's joint venture with Keolis commenced operating the First TransPennine Express rail franchise, FirstGroup having a 55% shareholding in the venture. During April 2004, FirstGroup commenced operating the First Great Western Link franchise, it also commenced the First ScotRail franchise in October 2004. In December 2004, the remainder of First North Western passed to Northern Rail, some services having already been transferred to Arriva Trains Wales and FirstTranspennine Express.

During April 2006, FirstGroup commenced operating the First Capital Connect franchise and a renewed First Great Western franchise that had been expanded to include the Thames Trains and Wessex Trains franchises.

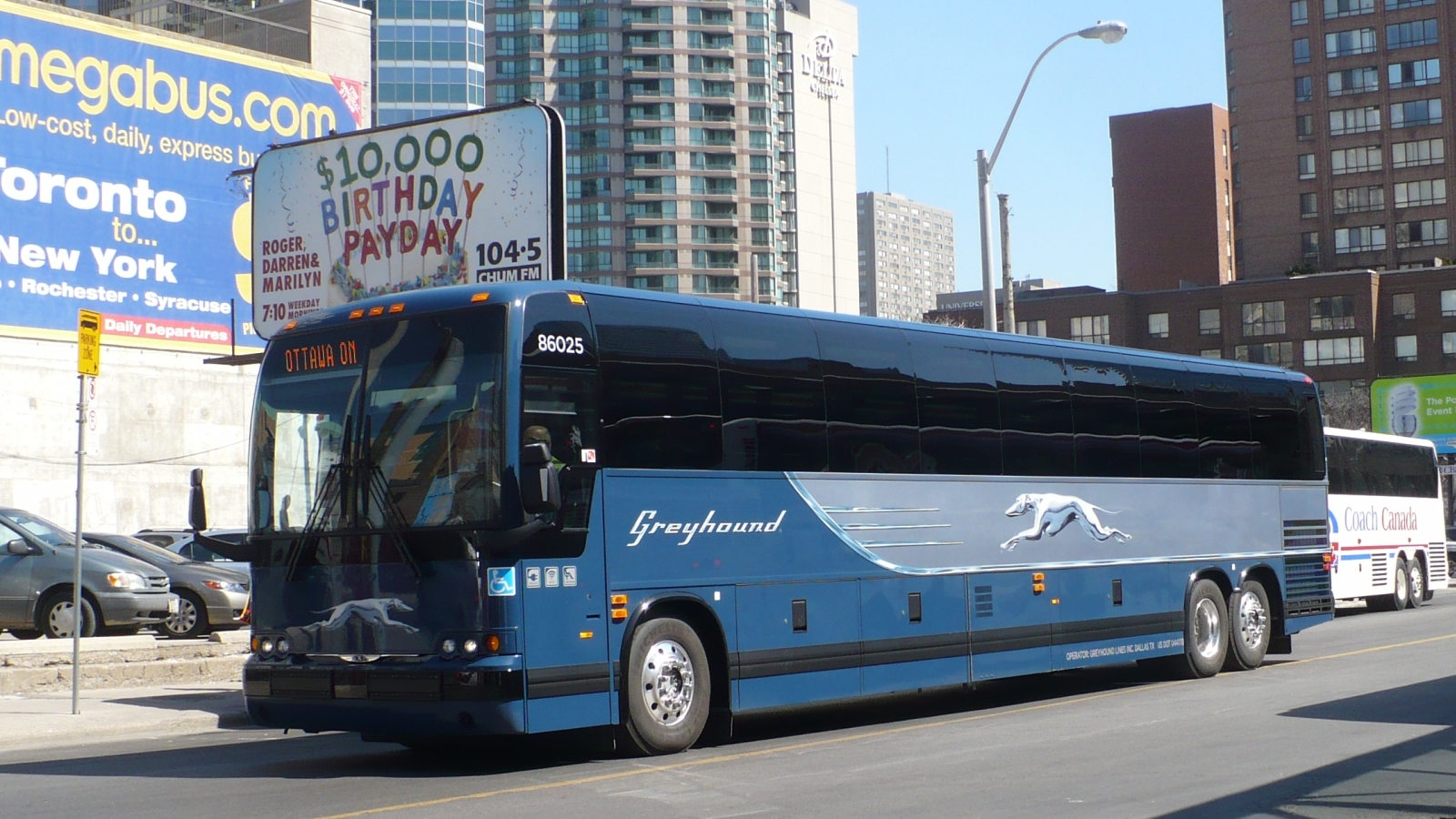
Greyhound Prevost coach at Toronto Coach Terminal in April 2009

In February 2007, FirstGroup agreed to buy the US-based firm Laidlaw, an operator of inter-city coaches and yellow school buses across North America, in exchange for £1.9 billion (US$3.7 billion). This also gave it a controlling stake in Greyhound Lines, the largest bus operator in North America. The Greyhound name and the names of Canadian subsidiaries of Greyhound Canada were retained, and all other Laidlaw-owned services in the United States and Canada were rebranded under the First or Greyhound names, except for Voyageur Colonial and Grey Goose in Canada.

In January 2009, DSBFirst, FirstGroup's joint venture with Danish State Railways commenced operating the Oresundtrain rail franchise from Helsingør and Nivå in Denmark along the Kystbanen line and over the Øresund Bridge to Malmö, Växjö, Kalmar, Karlskrona and Gothenburg in Sweden. FirstGroup had a 25% shareholding in the Danish business and 20% in the Swedish business.

During June 2009, FirstGroup made a takeover offer for fellow transport operator National Express, which was struggling with debt at the time and was struggling to hold onto its National Express East Coast rail franchise. This offer was rejected; a National Express spokesperson stated that it did not "consider it appropriate" at the time to discuss a takeover. FirstGroup believed that there was "significant industrial and commercial logic" for a merger, but National Express wished to focus on its own initiatives.

=== 2010s ===
In June 2010, FirstGroup sold its railfreight business First GBRf to the Eurotunnel Group in exchange for £31 million, ending the group's involvement in rail freight transport. In September 2010, former London Underground managing director Tim O'Toole, already a board member since May 2009 and chief operating officer and Deputy Chief Executive since June 2010, was announced as the successor to retiring group chief executive officer Moir Lockhead with effect from 31 March 2011.

During September 2011, FirstGroup's German bus operations were sold to Marwyn European Transport. In December 2011, DSBFirst ceased operating the Swedish part of the operation after difficulties encountered by Danish State Railways over cross subsidies.

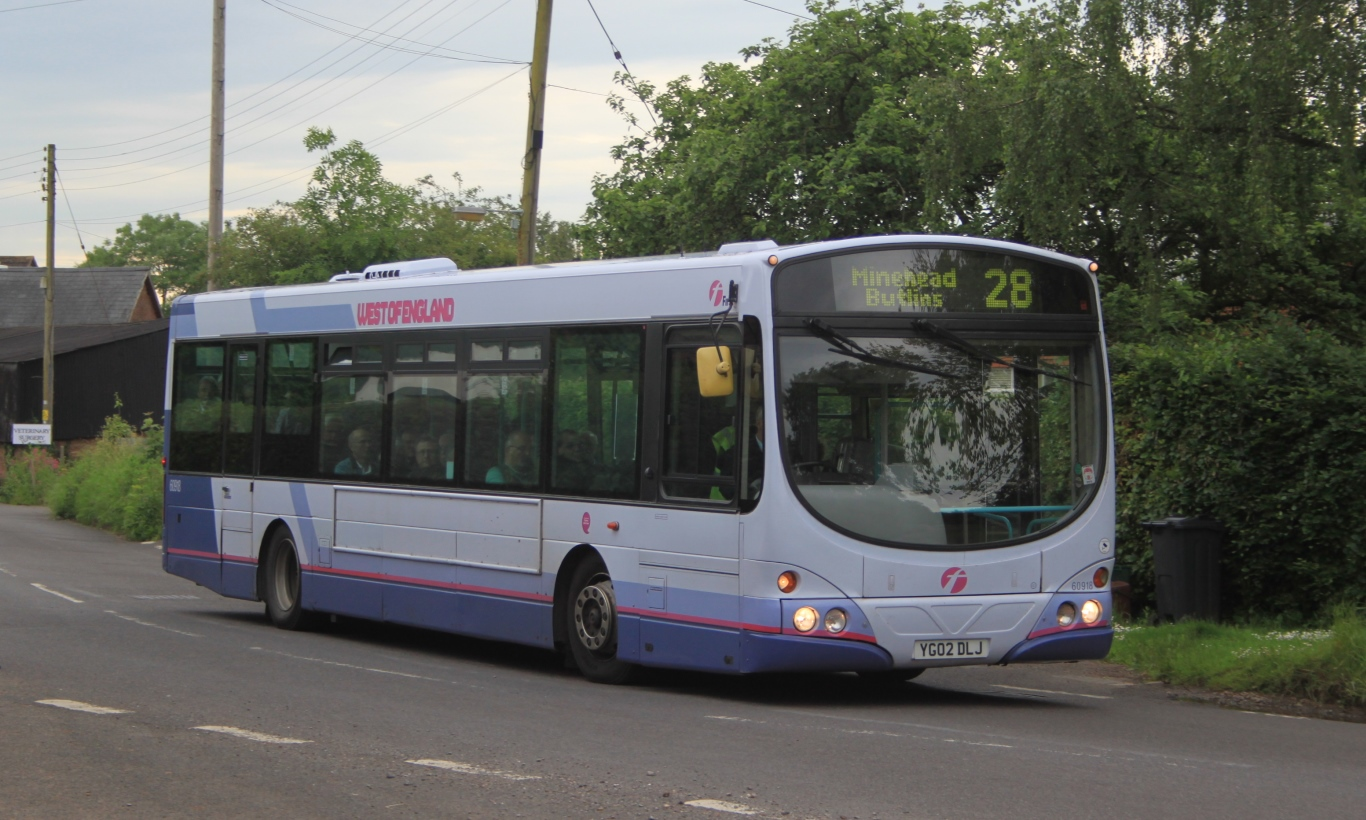
First bus in 'Olympia' livery in Bishops Lydeard in 2014

In July 2012, First Travel Solutions provided bus and coach services for the London 2012 Olympic Games as First Games Transport. This involved the provision of venue shuttle and park and ride services, services connecting the peripheral park and ride sites on the M25 with the Olympic Park and Ebbsfleet, and a nationwide network of express coaches to the Olympic Park and the Weymouth and Portland sailing venue. These services required around 900 vehicles in total, although some were sub-contracted. During June 2013, most of the First London bus operations were sold to Go-Ahead London, Metroline and Tower Transit.

In April 2015, FirstGroup was unsuccessful in bidding for the ScotRail franchise, which was run by Abellio ScotRail until the end of that franchise in March 2022. During December 2015, FirstGroup was awarded the next TransPennine Express franchise. The new franchise commenced on 1 April 2016 with a commitment to introduce new trains, routes and faster journey times.

During October 2016, First Transit commenced operating the A-train under contract to the Denton County Transportation Authority, its first rail operation in the United States. In August 2017, FirstGroup's joint venture with MTR Corporation commenced operating the South Western franchise, the company holding a 70% shareholding in the South Western Railway.

In May 2019, FirstGroup announced its intention to sell its UK bus operations and that its US activities were to receive greater attention in the future. However, the only sales completed were parts of First Greater Manchester to the Go-Ahead Group and Rotala.

=== 2020s ===
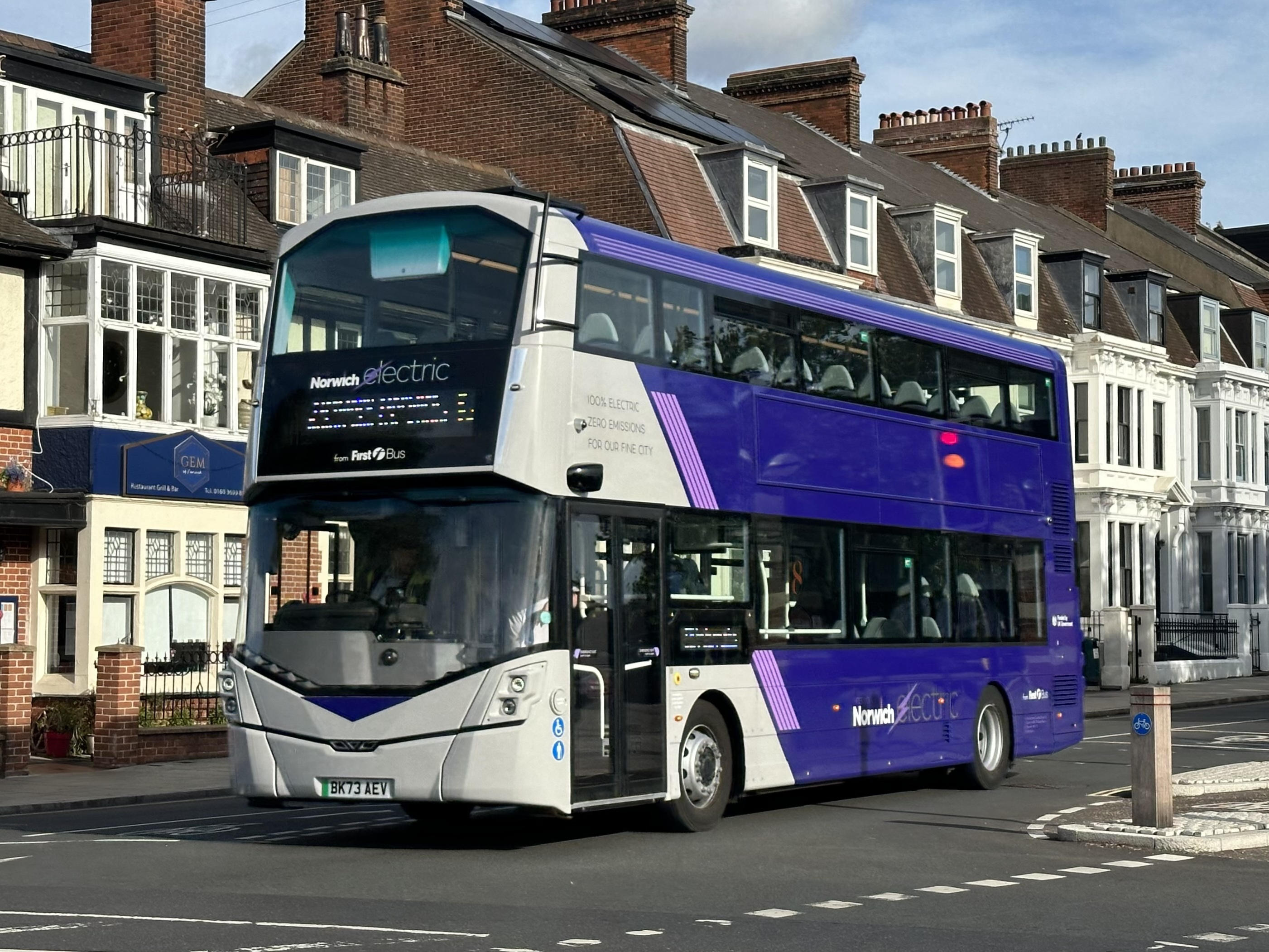
First Eastern Counties Wright StreetDeck Electroliner in Norwich in October 2023

In May 2020, following pressure from Canadian activist investor Coast Capital Savings, FirstGroup announced it has effectively reversed its previous strategy, opting to retain its UK bus operations and instead sell its assets in North America. In April 2021, FirstGroup agreed terms to sell the First Student and First Transit businesses to EQT; the sale completed later in 2021.

During October 2021, FirstGroup announced the sale of Greyhound Lines to Flixbus, completing its stated divestments to focus on its core UK public transport businesses. In October 2021, the open-access operator Lumo commenced operating services on the East Coast Main Line.

In June 2022, FirstGroup's board unanimously rejected a £1.2bn takeover proposal from US private equity firm I Squared Capital; a spokesperson stated that the offer had undervalued the company. While talks between the two companies continued for a further two months, I Squared ultimately called off its efforts in August 2022.

In February 2023, FirstGroup announced that subject to regulatory approval, it would purchase both the bus services and bus dealer operations of Purfleet-based Ensignbus. A year later in January 2024, FirstGroup purchased York Pullman, followed by both Lakeside Group and Anderson Travel in October 2024.

In September 2024, FirstGroup purchased Grand Union's London Euston to Stirling operating rights. In December 2024, it purchased Grand Union's other approved operating rights from London Paddington to Carmarthen, which was followed by the FirstGroup announcing it has agreed terms to purchase RATP Dev Transit London from RATP Group, forming First Bus London.

In January 2025, the FirstGroup purchased Matthews Coach Hire. In May 2025, the South Western Railway train operating company was transferred to the Department for Transport owned South Western Railway, following a commitment to renationalising railway services by the Labour Government.

In early 2026, the company purchased Hills Coaches of Wolverhampton, and, in April 2026, the company bought the family owned businesses, Eagle Coaches, based in Bristol, and Wilfreda Beehive.

== Operations ==
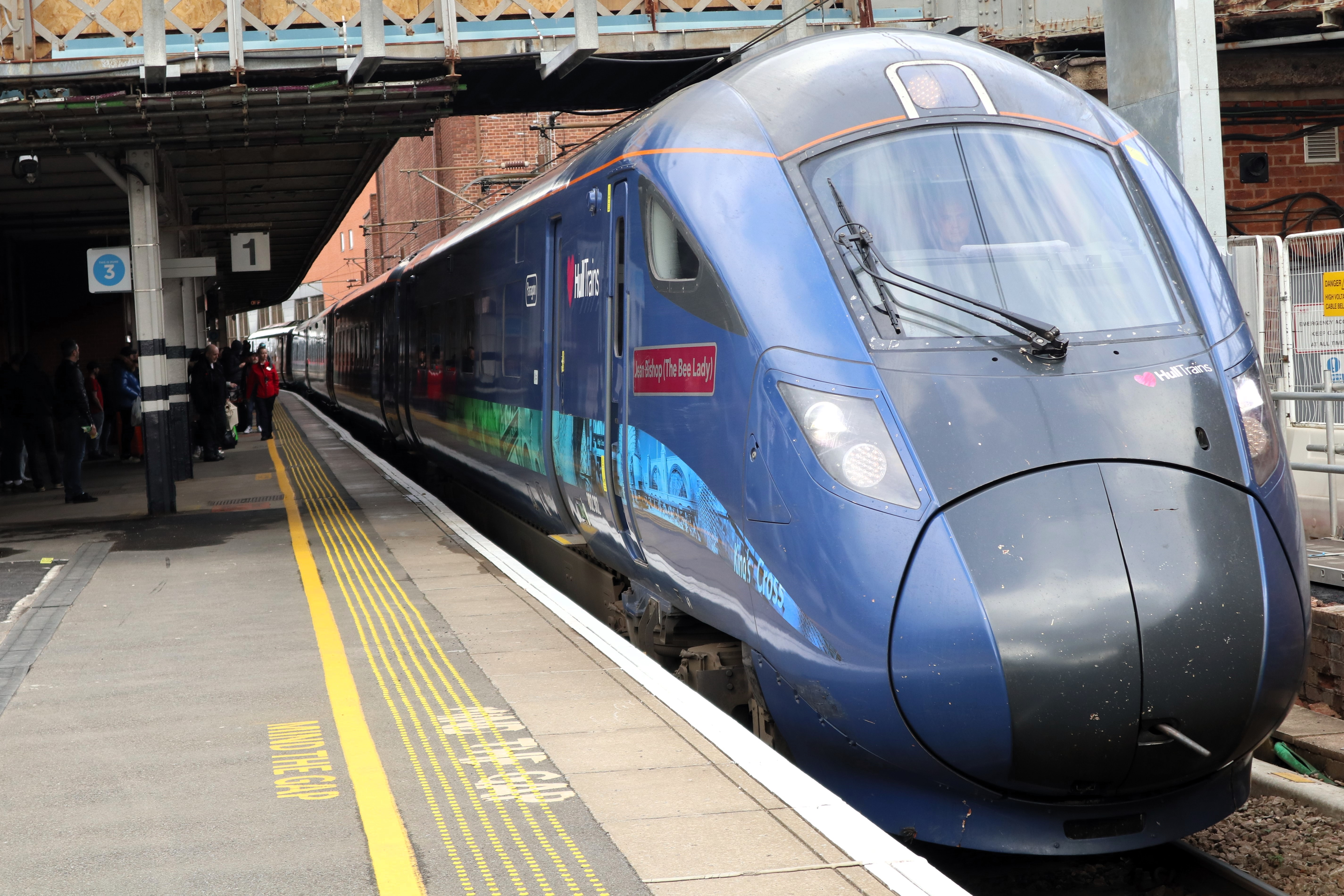
Hull Trains Class 802 Paragon at Doncaster in March 2024

As of July 2025, FirstGroup runs two franchised and two non-franchised passenger rail services in the UK. Current franchised passenger rail operations include Avanti West Coast (70% ownership alongside Trenitalia's 30%) and Great Western Railway, however these will both be re-nationalised by October 2027 to form part of Great British Railways.

FirstGroup also runs two non-franchised open access passenger operations from London Kings Cross– Hull Trains and Lumo. FirstGroup operates tram services within South London (Croydon, Wimbledon, Beckenham and New Addington) on the London Tramlink, network carrying approximately 24 million passengers per year on behalf of Transport for London.

FirstGroup owns and operates the Aircoach service in Dublin, linking Dublin Airport with the city centre, the south side of Dublin, Greystones and Bray as well as long-distance express services runs to Cork and Belfast.

In December 2025, it was announced that FirstGroup had acquired RATP Dev’s sightseeing bus operations in London and Bath, including the Tootbus brand and associated depots. The transaction added a 63-vehicle fleet and around 190 employees, extending the group’s presence in key urban markets and bringing the Airdecker airport service into its portfolio.

== Corporate branding and liveries ==
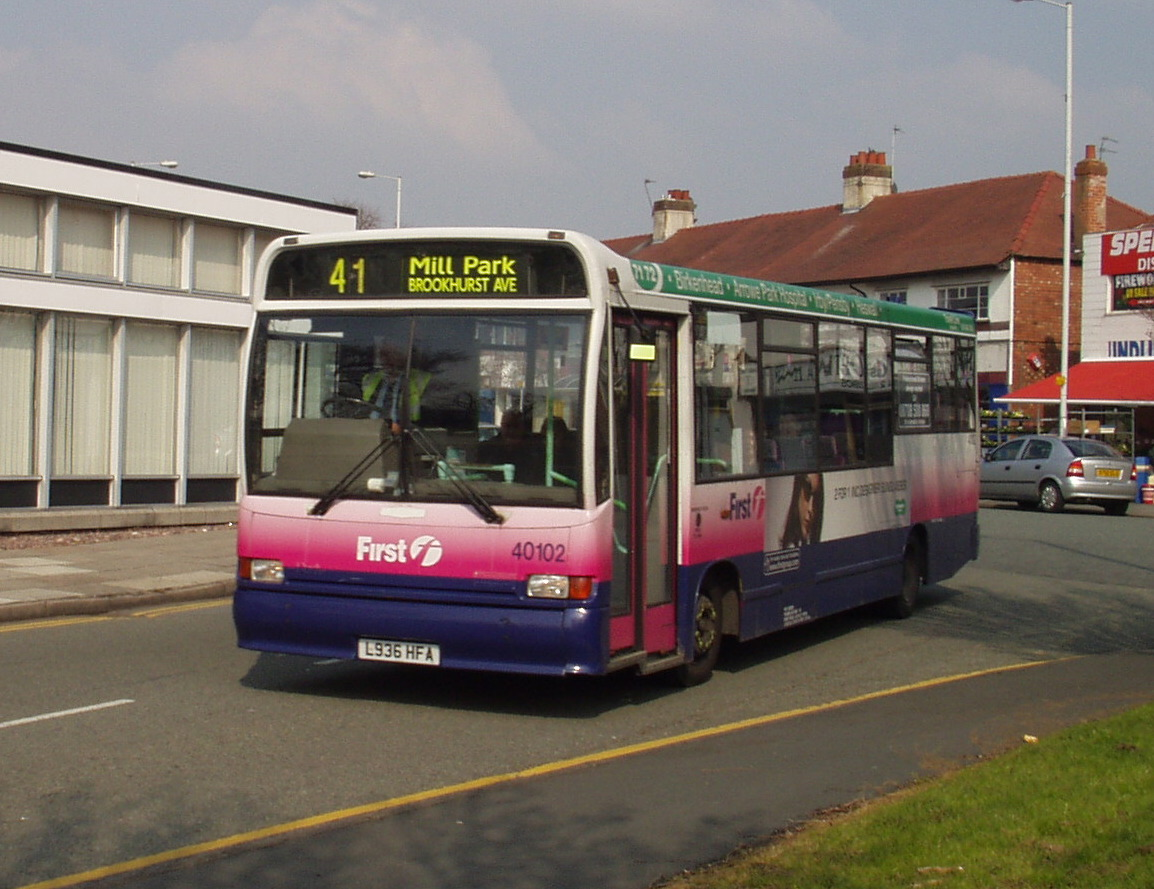
Marshall bodied Dennis Dart in Bromborough in March 2007 in the original "Barbie 2" livery

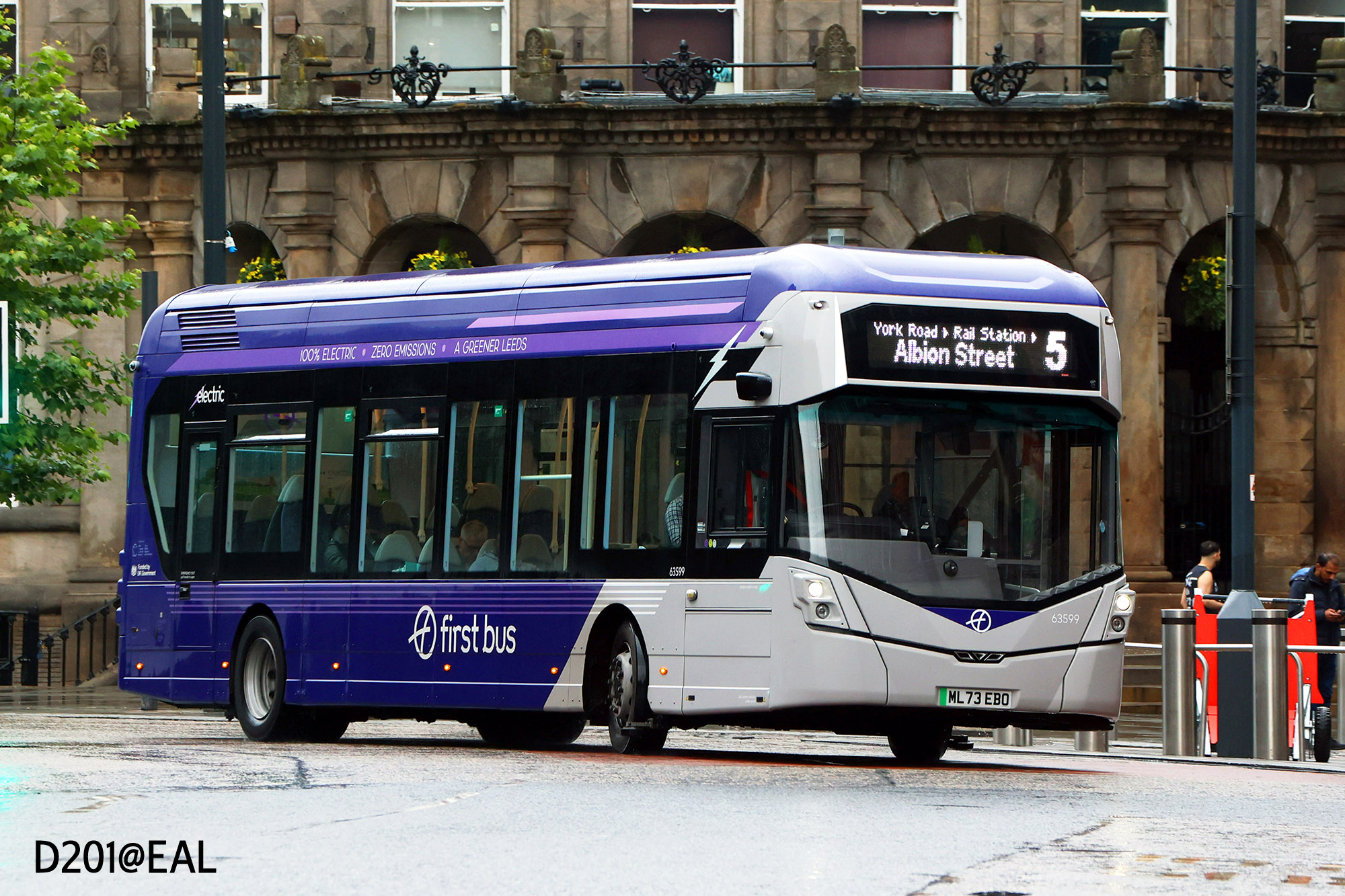
Wright GB Kite Electroliner in Leeds in "Ultraviolet" livery

FirstGroup has always had a consistent brand and uses the First brand for most of its operations. FirstBus began to apply a standard corporate typeface to its fleet names in the late 1990s, introducing the stylised f logo depicting a road. A corporate white, pink and blue livery nicknamed "Barbie" was introduced to new buses, while further bus company acquisitions continued. Inherited bus fleets were initially left in their original colours with First fleet names, with the intention that the Barbie scheme would stand for a set service quality. Later older buses received a modified "Barbie 2" livery.

As part of its corporate branding introduced in November 2001, First subsequently removed all local branding for its bus services, buses simply carried the 'First' brand, although each company still operated independently. In 2012, the group began to introduce a new purple, white and lilac 'Olympia' livery to its bus fleets, which also reinstated local branding. In January 2014, the company rebranded its First Somerset & Avon operations in Bridgwater and Taunton as The Buses of Somerset, using a two-tone green livery.

The FirstGroup's bus operations were rebranded again in December 2024, adopting a new logo that replaced the one used since the formation of FirstBus in April 1995 as well as the slogan of 'Moving the Everyday'. This coincided with the introduction of a purple and grey livery named "ultraviolet" which had already begun to be rolled out onto the group's bus fleets using the former logo.

Hull Trains carries a predominantly blue livery, including white, pink and purple. This was also used by First Great Western until 20 September 2015, when the franchise was rebranded as Great Western Railway, with a new logo and dark green livery paying homage to the original Great Western Railway.

In Scotland, First ScotRail operated with a blue livery with white saltire markings on the carriage ends, as mandated by the Scottish Government's transport agency Transport Scotland.

== Current operating businesses ==
Current operating businesses include:

=== First Bus ===

In September 2022 First Bus was reorganised as follows:

==== United Kingdom ====
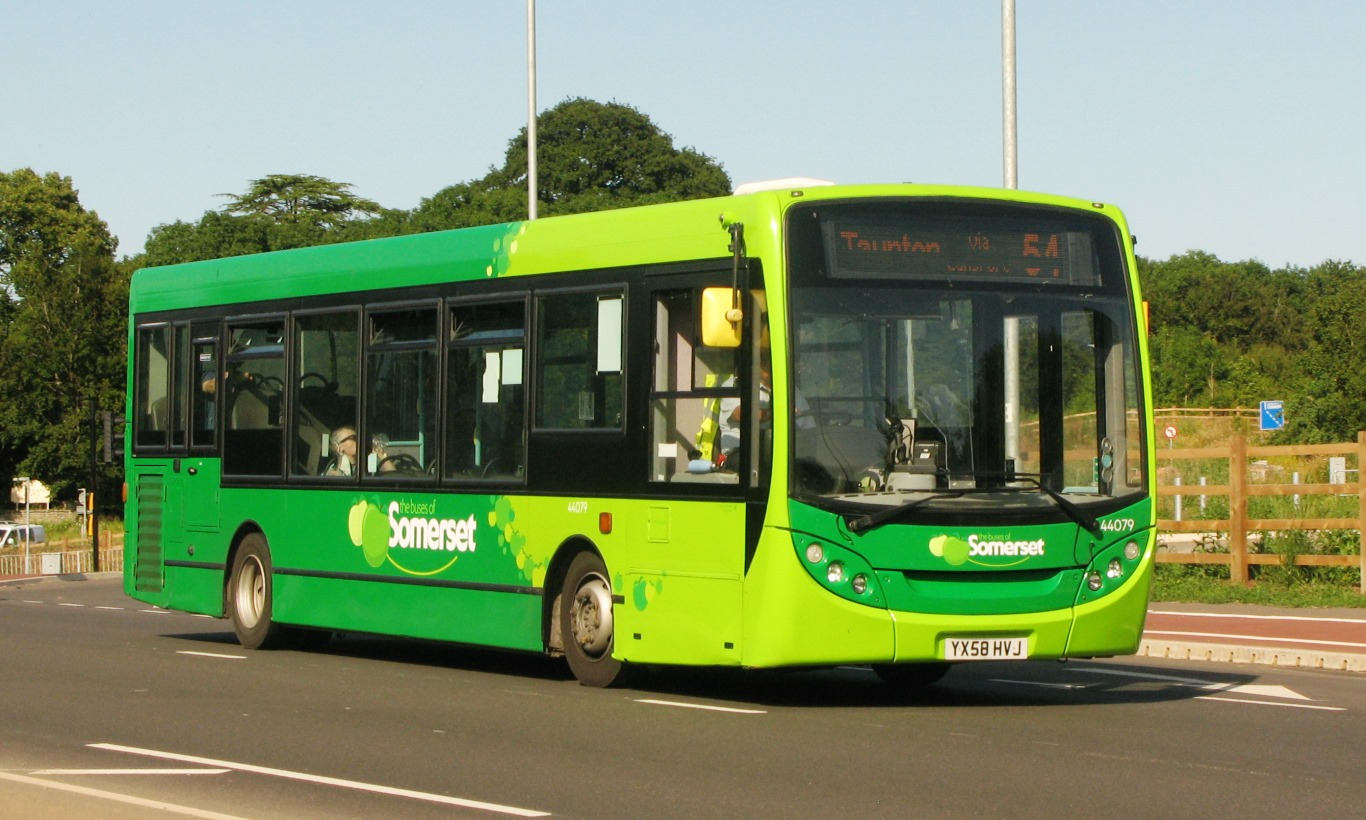
The Buses of Somerset Alexander Dennis Enviro200 in Ruishton in July 2021

===== Scotland =====
- First Aberdeen (formerly First Grampian)
  - King Coaches (formerly First Aberdeen Coach Hire and Grampian Executive)
- First Glasgow (formerly First Kelvin and First Greater Glasgow)

===== East of England =====
- First Eastern Counties
- First Essex (formerly First Eastern National, First Thamesway)
  - Ensignbus

===== Manchester, Midlands and South Yorkshire =====
- First South Yorkshire & Midlands
  - First South Yorkshire (formerly First Mainline)
  - Lakeside Coaches
    - Merediths Coaches
    - A.T Brown Coaches
  - Wilfreda Beehive
- First Leicester (Leicester Electric) (Formerly Leicester city bus, Leicester corporation transport)
  - East Midlands Airport Carpark shuttles (First Leicester)
  - Hills Coaches
- First Greater Manchester (Bee Network)
- First Potteries (operating in Staffordshire and South Cheshire, formerly First PMT/PMT Limited)

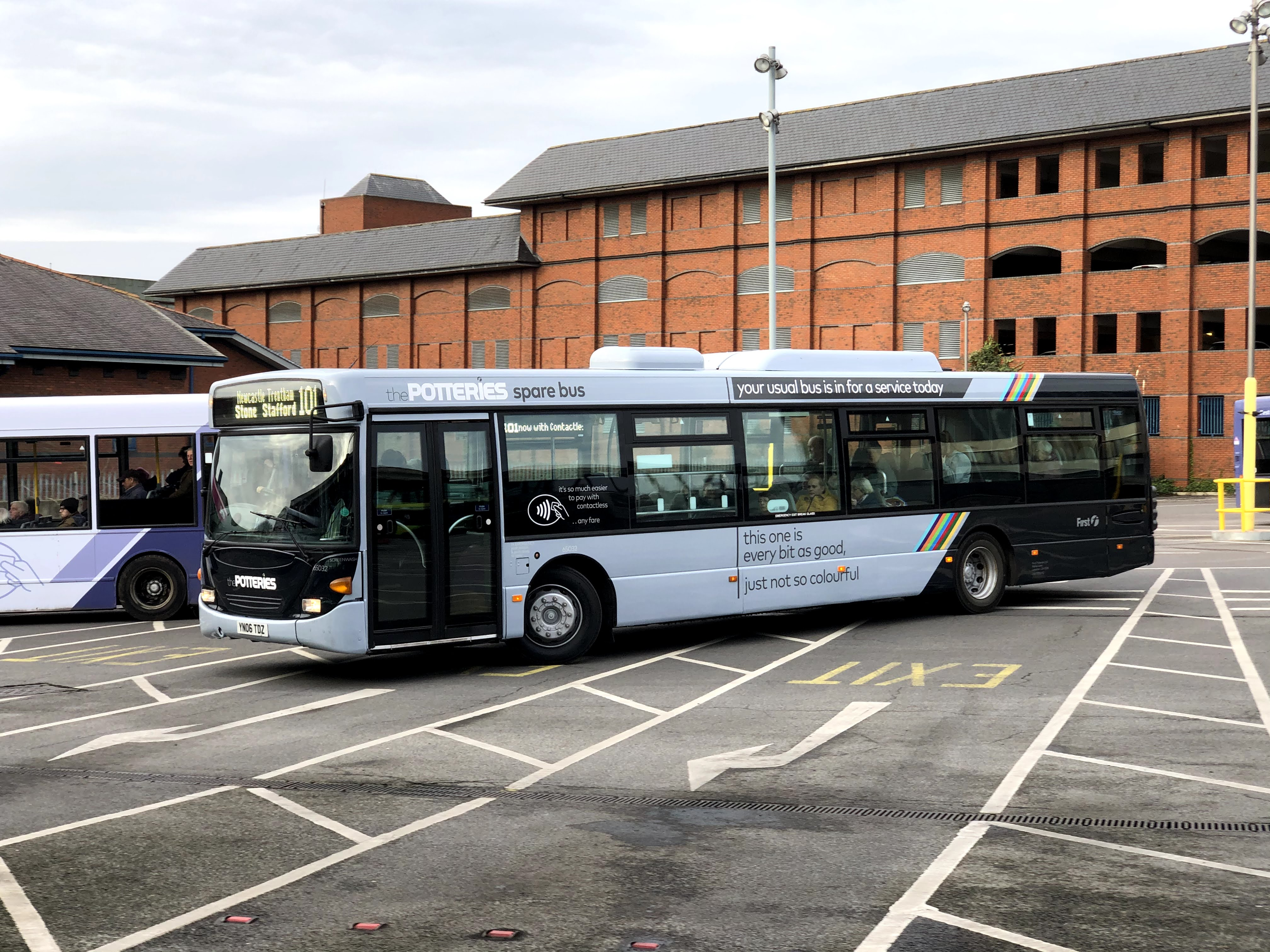
First Potteries Scania Omnicity in Stoke-on-Trent (January 2020)

===== North and West Yorkshire =====
- First West Yorkshire
  - Tetleys Coaches
- First Bradford
- First Halifax, Calder Valley & Huddersfield
- First Leeds
  - J&B Travel
- First York (including the York Park & Ride)
  - York Pullman

===== Greater London =====
- First Bus London (London United, London Sovereign and London Transit)
  - Anderson Travel
  - The Original Tour

===== South and South West England =====
- First South West (formerly First Devon & Cornwall)
  - Somerset Passenger Solutions
- First Berkshire & The Thames Valley
- First Hampshire and Dorset

===== Wales and West of England =====
- First West of England (formerly First Bristol & First Somerset & Avon)
  - Bath Bus Company
  - Eagle Coaches
- First Worcestershire (sometimes referred to as First Wyvern)
- First Cymru

===== Other operations =====
- First Travel Solutions re-branded 2016 (formerly First Rail Support) which provides emergency and planned rail replacement transport to train operating companies using First and non-First Transport through its 24-hour control room in Clayton-le-moors Lancashire.
- First Tram operations (Tramlink) Taken over by First Group in 2017 it deals with one of the two light rail networks in greater London.

==== Northern Ireland ====
- First Northern Ireland Limited.

==== Ireland ====
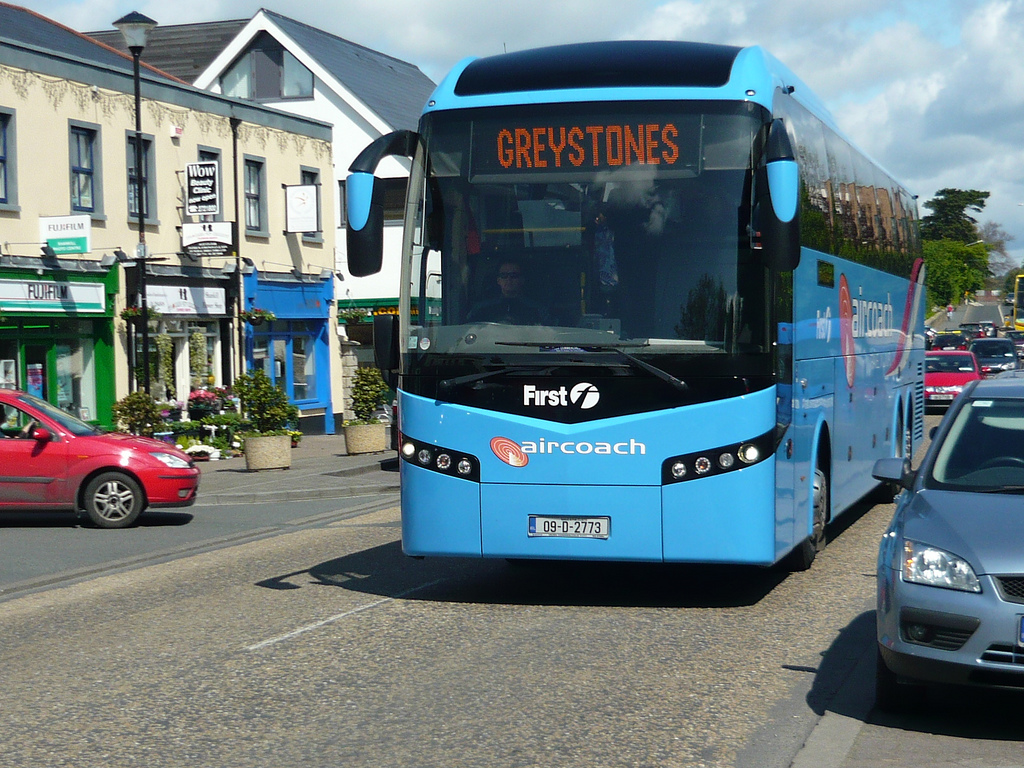
Aircoach Jonckheere SHV bodied Volvo with destination of Greystones in Shankill

- Aircoach (First Bus Ireland Limited)
  - Matthews Coach Hire

=== First Rail ===
==== United Kingdom ====
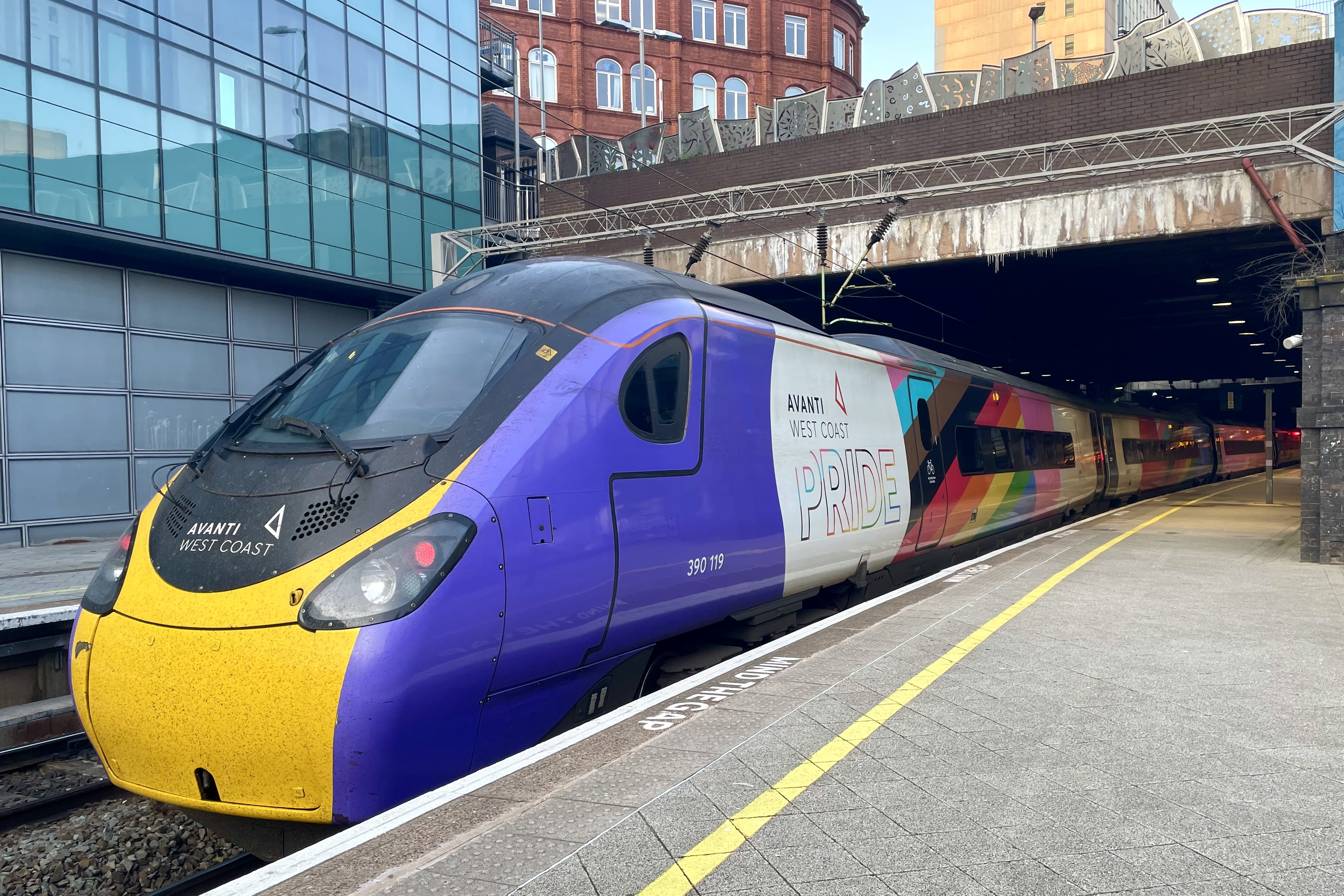
An Avanti West Coast Class 390 Pendolino at Birmingham New Street Station

- Avanti West Coast (70% shareholding)
- First Rail London
- Great Western Railway
- Hull Trains
- London Tramlink
- Lumo
- London cable car operated on behalf of TfL

== Former operating companies ==
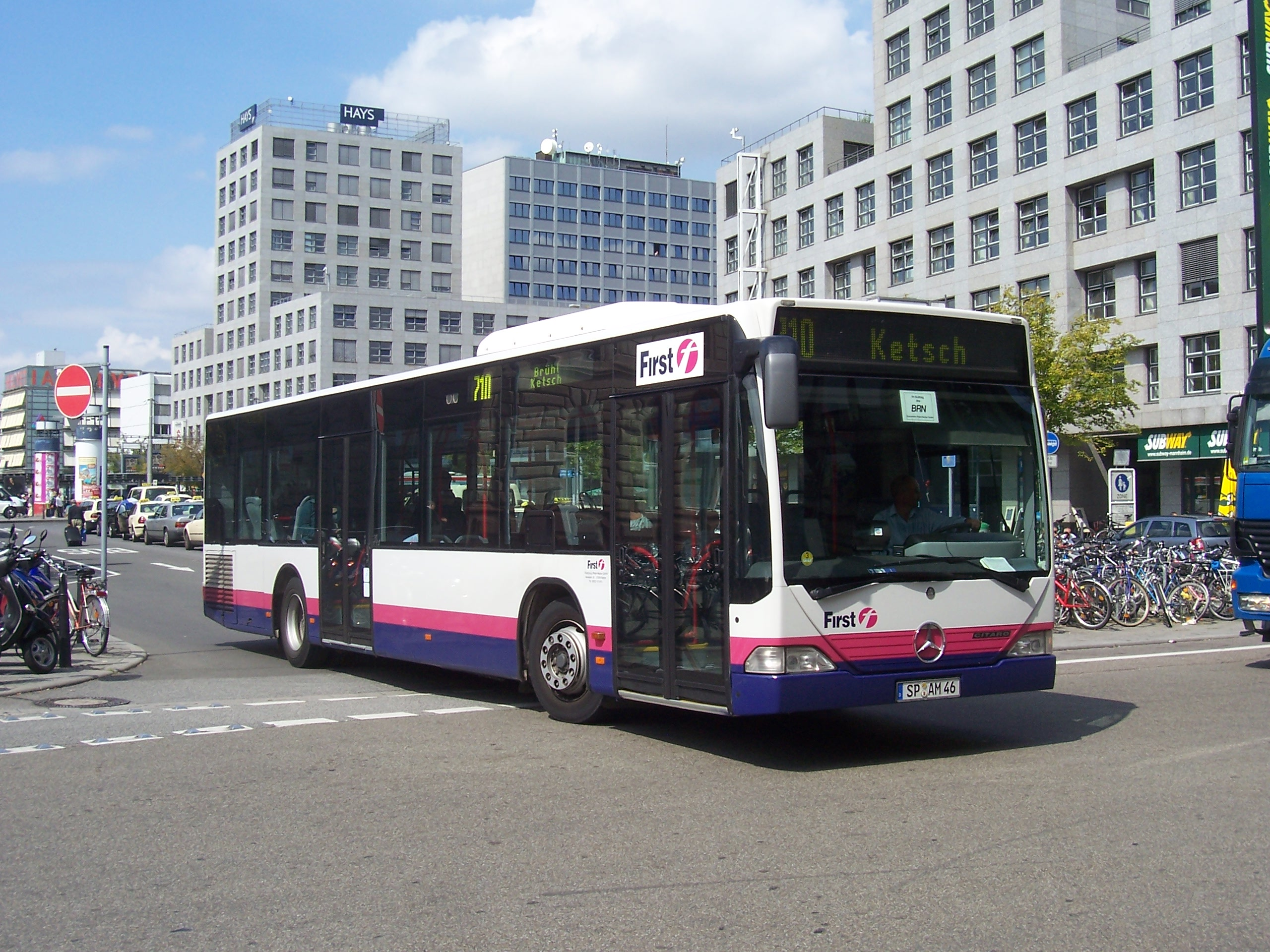
FirstGroup Rhein-Neckar Mercedes-Benz Citaro in Mannheim in August 2008

=== Bus and coach ===
==== Canada ====
- Greyhound Canada (intercity bus services)
  - Grey Goose Bus Lines
  - Vancouver Island Coach Lines
  - Voyageur Colonial Bus Lines
  - First Student (school, charter bus and public transit services)
  - HandyDART Contract to TransLink (British Columbia) for accessible transit service in Metro Vancouver

==== Germany ====
- FirstGroup Rhein-Neckar sold September 2011 to Marwyn European Transport

==== Hong Kong ====
- New World First Bus 26% stake sold May 2000 to New World Development

==== United Kingdom ====
- First Chester & The Wirral sold to Stagecoach Merseyside & South Lancashire in January 2013
- First Northampton ceased 14 September 2013
- First Scotland East (formerly First SMT, First Borders and First Midland Bluebird) sold to McGills in September 2022
- First London from March 1997 until September 2013, most operations sold to Go-Ahead London, Metroline and Tower Transit, remainder ceased upon expiry of contracts in September 2013. First have since re-entered the London market, following the purchase of RATP.
- Greyhound UK coach services between September 2009 and December 2015
- First Borders (formerly Lowland Scottish and part of the wider First Scotland East group) sold to West Coast Motors, trading as Borders Buses, on 26 March 2017.
- First Southampton (also known as First CityRed) ceased trading on 18 February 2023.
- Aircoach (Leicester to Birmingham Airport) a trial service which started in September 2023 was discontinued on 31 October 2024 due to poor passenger numbers.
- First Kernow ceased operations, due to years of financial struggles. Go Cornwall Bus, part of Go Ahead, provided alternative services with help from Cornwall Council.
- Truronian was sold to the Go-Ahead Group as part of First's exit from the Cornwall market.

==== United States ====
- Greyhound Lines (intercity bus services)
  - BoltBus (a discount operator competing with Megabus)
- First Vehicle Services, which maintained vehicles for many corporations, organisations and local governments, including the other First divisions.
- First Student, sold in 2021
- First Transit, sold in 2021

=== Rail ===
==== United Kingdom ====
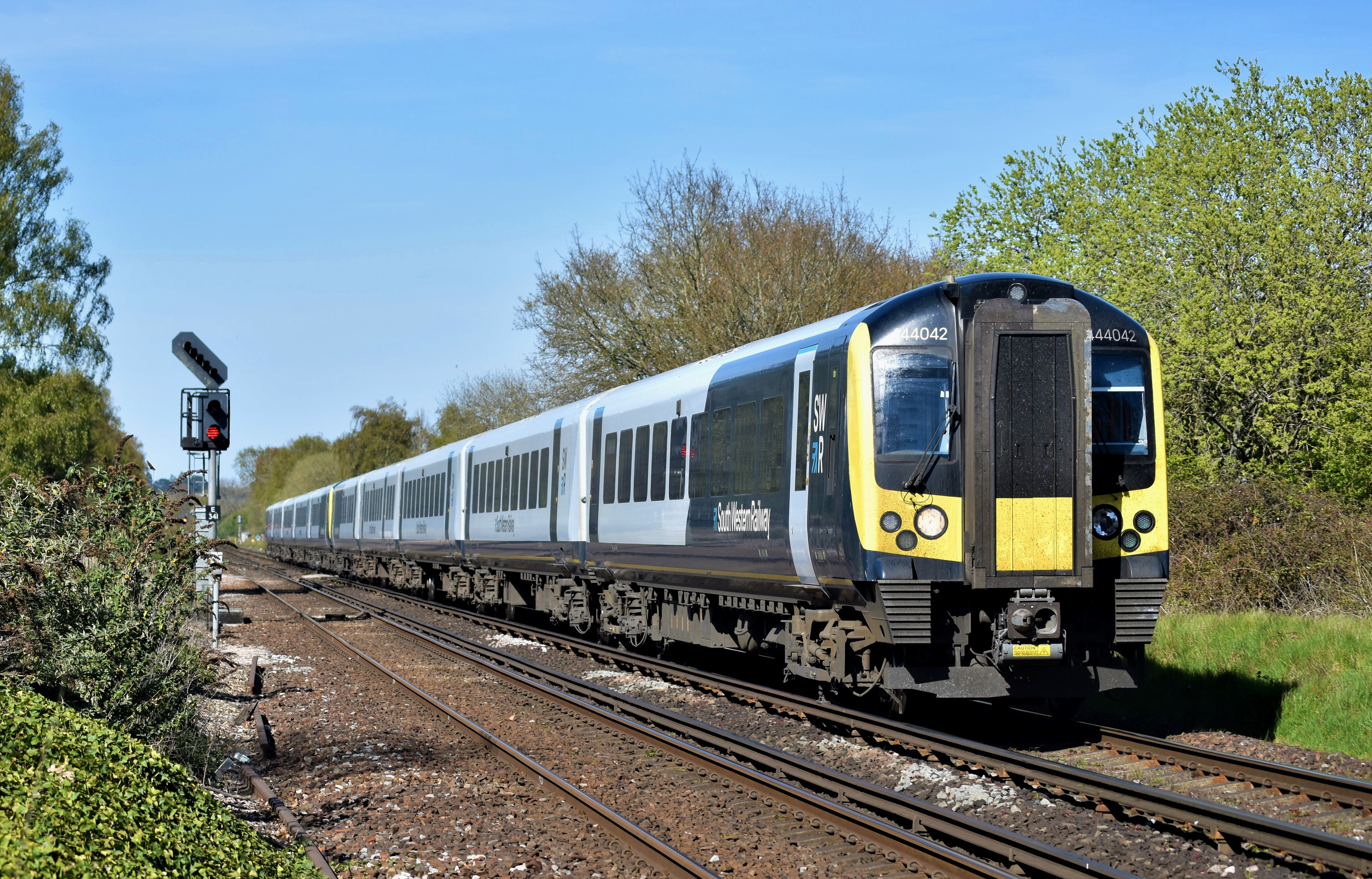
A Class 444 operated by South Western Railway

- First Great Eastern from January 1997 until April 2004, incorporated into Greater Anglia franchise subsequently operated by National Express as One
- First Great Western Link from April 2004 until March 2006, before becoming part of Great Western Railway
- First North Western from March 1997 until December 2004, operations split between Arriva Trains Wales, First TransPennine Express and Northern Rail
- First GBRf from August 2003 until sold in June 2010 to Eurotunnel Group, rebranded as GB Railfreight
- First Capital Connect from April 2006 until September 2014, succeeded by Govia Thameslink Railway
- First ScotRail from October 2004 until March 2015, succeeded by Abellio ScotRail & Caledonian Sleeper
- First TransPennine Express (55% shareholding) from February 2004 until March 2016, succeeded by TransPennine Express with FirstGroup having 100% ownership
- TransPennine Express from April 2016 until May 2023, superseded by government-owned TransPennine Express
- South Western Railway First/MTR (70% shareholding) from August 2017 until May 2025, succeeded by government-owned South Western Railway

==== United States ====
- A-train, Denton County Transportation Authority commenced October 2016

==== Denmark and Sweden ====
- DSBFirst was a joint rail venture with Danish State Railways (30% shareholding) until 2013
