= Moir Lockhead =

British businessman (born 1945)

Sir Moir Lockhead OBE DHC (born 25 April 1945 in County Durham, England) is an English businessman. He was Chief Executive and Deputy Chairman of UK transport group FirstGroup. Originally a mechanical engineer, he left school (West Cornforth Secondary Modern) at 15 to become apprentice mechanic in a bus garage in Darlington, before working for a short period as a management trainee with Tarmac. In 1979, he was appointed Chief Engineer of Glasgow City Transport. He joined Grampian Regional Transport in 1985 as General Manager, and went on to lead the successful employee buy-out as GRT Group.

He was made an Officer of the Order of the British Empire (OBE) in 1996 for services to the bus industry. He is a past President of the Confederation of Passenger Transport. He was knighted in the 2008 Birthday Honours. In 2009, the University of Aberdeen awarded him a Doctorate honoris causa (DHC). In 2010, he was awarded the VisitScotland Silver Thistle Award for outstanding services to the tourism industry in Scotland.

In 2011, he was appointed Chairman of the Scottish Rugby Union. In 2014, he was re-appointed for a second three-year term. In 2014, he was appointed Chairman of the National Trust for Scotland.

In January 2011, First Great Western powercar 43160 was named Sir Moir Lockhead as was First ScotRail diesel multiple unit 170401 in March 2011.

== Personal life ==
Lockhead is married with four children and lives on his family's 300-acre (120 ha) cattle farm near Aberdeen where he breeds Highland cattle.
