= List of former municipal bus companies of the United Kingdom =

This is a list of former municipal bus companies of the United Kingdom and a brief description of their fate, with the exception of the several municipals which disappeared in 1968 and 1974 with the formation of the PTE bus operations.

Of the remaining municipals, post-1986 many were sold off or collapsed during bus deregulation, which required their separation into stand-alone arm's-length companies.

Only a handful of municipal operators remain, with some securing their futures with equity partnership deals with private operators. Of the remaining operators, Cardiff Bus, Lothian Buses and Nottingham City Transport are the largest.

== Former UK local authority-owned bus companies ==
The companies listed here were sold or ceased operating after 1986.

- Barrow Borough Transport – Following the operation's failure in May 1989, services were replaced by Stagecoach.
- Blackburn Transport – On 22 January 2007, Transdev acquired the business of Blackburn Transport from Blackburn with Darwen Borough Council and integrated it with its Lancashire United operation. This now trades as Blackburn Bus Company.
- Yellow Buses, Bournemouth – Yellow Buses was sold first to Transdev on 17 December 2005 for £15m, after the Liberal Democrat-controlled borough council decided that it could not satisfactorily invest in the company itself. Transdev returned ten percent of the equity to the council. The undertaking had been under municipal control or ownership for over 100 years. On 3 March 2011 the company became part of RATP Group as a consequence of that group's exit from its part ownership of Transdev. In July 2019 Yellow Buses was bought out from RATP by its management. The company entered administration in July 2022 and ceased trading on 4 August 2022.
- Brighton Borough Transport – The municipal operator was sold by the then Brighton Borough Council to its employees in December 1993, using the operating name Brighton Blue Bus. Go-Ahead Group purchased the company in May 1997 and subsequently integrated it into its existing Brighton & Hove operations.
- Burnley & Pendle Transport – Burnley & Pendle was jointly owned by Burnley and Pendle borough councils. Liberal Democrat-controlled Pendle Borough Council's fifty-percent share was sold to Stagecoach in February 1996. At the time, Labour-controlled Burnley Borough Council stated that it had no intention of selling its share in the company, but it was not able to invest sufficient funds in the company and voted in October 1996 to sell its share to Stagecoach. Stagecoach was to sell the former Burnley & Pendle garage and operations to Blazefield Group in 2001. The Blazefield Group was bought by Transdev in 2006.
- ChesterBus – In June 2007 ChesterBus was sold to FirstGroup by the then Chester City Council. The sale process was longer than anticipated due to a court case against Arriva, which the council lost. Only the operations were sold and at first the fleet and depot remained in council ownership, on temporary loan to the new owner. First Chester & The Wirral was sold to Stagecoach Merseyside & South Lancashire in January 2013.
- Chesterfield Transport – Sold to its managers in April 1990, the operation is now part of Stagecoach East Midlands. It was acquired by the Stagecoach group in 1995 and merged with their East Midland Motor Services operations. Although most of the Chesterfield rolling stock was disposed of in the first year the former Chesterfield Transport Stonegravels depot is still in use. There are still many Stagecoach buses in the Chesterfield area billed as "Stagecoach in Chesterfield" still carrying Chesterfield transport legal lettering although the legal lettering now has a registered address further afield at Stagecoach Yorkshire's Barnsley area office (previously Yorkshire Traction). As at April 2009, the Chesterfield area is part of both of the East Midlands and Yorkshire area according to Stagecoach's own publicity but is effectively run from Barnsley.
- Cleveland Transit – Bought out by the management and employees in May 1991. Sold to Stagecoach in November 1994.
- Colchester Borough Transport – Acquired by British Bus in November 1993, which was subsequently sold to the Cowie Group, the bus operations of Colchester were rebranded as Arriva Colchester when Cowie renamed itself Arriva in 1997. The company was sold to Tellings-Golden Miller in August 2004, after which it traded under the name Network Colchester. Tellings-Golden Miller was bought by Arriva in January 2008, bringing Colchester operations back under Arriva control. The services operate under the Arriva brand once again.
- Cynon Valley Transport – Taken over in August 1992 by Red & White. Red & White was a subsidiary of Western Travel, which was itself taken over by Stagecoach Western in December 1993.
- Darlington Transport – Amid widely reported events, the bus operations of the Darlington Borough Council went into administration in November 1994 during an attempted sale, due to historical financial difficulties and the effects of the Darlington Bus War.
- Derby City Transport – Sold in July 1989 to a consortium of its managers and employees and Luton & District. These sold out to British Bus, which was taken over by Cowie, now Arriva.
- East Staffordshire District Council – formerly Burton upon Trent Corporation Transport Department. Formed in 1903 by the Burton upon Trent Tramways Order, being authorised to construct and operate electric tramways. Was the first municipal operator to create an arms-length company. Merged with Stevensons of Uttoxeter just before the implementation of the Transport Act 1985. Stevensons was taken over in 1994 by British Bus, who in turn became Arriva. Town services were provided by Arriva Midlands, although the Stevensons of Uttoxeter operator’s licence was later used only in the Stoke-on-Trent area for Wardle Transport services, until they were sold to D&G Bus in May 2015. Julian Peddle, who sold Stevensons to Arriva, has financial interests in both D&G Bus who also operate some former ESDC routes.
- Eastbourne Buses – Sold to Stagecoach in January 2009.
- Fylde – Sold by Fylde Borough Council to its management in December 1993, the company was bought by Blackpool Transport, itself a municipal operator, in summer 1994.
- Grampian Regional Transport – Sold by the then Grampian Regional Council to its employees in January 1989, the company expanded into the GRT Group, predecessor to FirstGroup.
- Great Yarmouth Transport – Great Yarmouth's 49-vehicle fleet and operations were acquired by FirstBus, precursor of FirstGroup, in September 1996 for £1.1 million. The services – along with Great Yarmouth routes of sister company Eastern Counties – were initially operated under the Blue Bus moniker.
- Grimsby-Cleethorpes Transport – The 111-vehicle bus operation of the then boroughs of Great Grimsby and Cleethorpes was sold to Stagecoach in November 1993.
- Halton Transport – Ceased trading in January 2020 after a period of loss-making operation.
- Hartlepool Transport – Sold by the Hartlepool Borough Council to its employees in June 1993, the company was acquired by Stagecoach in January 1995.
- Hyndburn Transport – Hyndburn Borough Council, based in Accrington, sold its bus operations to Stagecoach in September 1996. The operation was soon merged into sister company Stagecoach Ribble, with the garage in Accrington closed and services operated from the Ribble garage in neighbouring Blackburn. In 2001, Stagecoach sold its Blackburn garage and operations to Blazefield Group, which then operated the services under the fleetname Lancashire United. The Blazefield Group was acquired by Transdev in 2006 and these services are now branded as Blackburn Bus Company.
- Inter-Valley Link – Sold in February 1989 by the then Rhymney Valley District Council to National Welsh, which in early 1992 was placed in receivership.
- Islwyn Borough Transport – Sold in January 2010 by Caerphilly County Borough Council to Stagecoach.
- Kent Top Travel – Fully owned by Kent County Council and operated mostly tendered local bus routes around rural parts of Kent as well as the Canterbury Park & Ride operation. The company was set up in 2005 and ceased operations in 2013 as part of a phased withdrawal of council bus operations.
- Kingston-upon-Hull City Transport – Former municipal Cleveland Transport bought Kingston upon Hull's municipal bus operations in December 1993, offering a 49-percent stake in the company back to the employees. The operation passed into the hands of Stagecoach in November 1994.
- Lancaster City Transport – The company was placed on the market by Lancaster City Council on 16 December 1992. Interest was expressed in buying the company as a going concern by Blackpool Transport Services and MTL, owners of Merseybus. However, following increased competition by Stagecoach, it was decided to wind the company up. On 22 August 1993, the company ceased trading, having sold the depot and its twelve newest buses to Stagecoach (North West).
- Leicester CityBus – Leicester City Council sold its bus operations to GRT Group (the former Aberdeen bus operator) in November 1993 and Leicester Citybus now trade as First Leicester.
- Lincoln City Transport – Sold by Lincoln City Council to a consortium of Derby City Transport (40 percent) and the company's employees and management in November 1991. The company was bought in 1993 by Traction Group, which had owned Lincolnshire Road Car since January 1988. Yorkshire Traction was itself purchased by Stagecoach in December 2005.
- Boro'line Maidstone – Boro'line Maidstone was formed in 1986 as an arm's-length company of Maidstone Borough Council from their historical transport arm. After brief expansion into London-tendered routes, financial difficulties saw the council attempt to sell the company. The London operations were sold to Kentish Bus, and after a period of operation in administration, the Maidstone operations were sold to Maidstone & District, ending the Boro'line identity.
- Merthyr Tydfil Transport – Ceased to operate in 1989.
- Northampton Transport – The municipal operations of Northampton were sold to GRT Group, precursor to FirstGroup, in October 1993, subsequently operated as First Northampton but ceased during late 2013.
- Plymouth Citybus – Plymouth City Council sold its 100-percent shareholding in the company to Go-Ahead in December 2009, after a long council meeting.
- Portsmouth City Transport – Sold to its management and employees in June 1988, it was taken over by Stagecoach in October 1989. Most of the business was sold on to Transit Holdings in January 1991, and to FirstBus – now FirstGroup – in April 1996 and is now part of First Hampshire & Dorset.
- Preston Bus – Sold to its employees in March 1993. Remained in business until employees voted to sell out to Stagecoach North West in January 2009. This followed eighteen months of fierce competition in the town between the two companies. Because of the reduced competition, Stagecoach were ordered to sell Preston Bus in November 2009. It is now part of the Rotala group.
- Rossendale Transport, trading as Rosso – Sold by Rossendale Borough Council to Transdev in January 2018.
- Southampton Citybus – Southampton Citybus was sold to its employees in December 1993. FirstGroup bought the company in 1997, initially renamed as First Southampton, which was to merge with the former People's Provincial operations in Portsmouth in 1999, and was part of First Hampshire & Dorset for a while until operations in Southampton closed in February 2023.
- Southend Transport – The company was sold by Southend Borough Council to British Bus in June 1993. In 1997, it became part of the rebranded Arriva group.
- Taff Ely Transport – Taken over in September 1988 by National Welsh, which in early 1992 was placed in receivership.
- Tayside Transport – Bought by its employees in June 1991 from the then Tayside Regional Council, it was taken over by National Express in February 1997 and is now known as Xplore Dundee.
- Thamesdown Transport – Sold by Swindon Borough Council to Go South Coast in February 2017.

== See also ==
- Coach transport in the United Kingdom
- List of bus operators of the United Kingdom
