= First Chester & The Wirral =

Bus operator in Cheshire and Merseyside, England

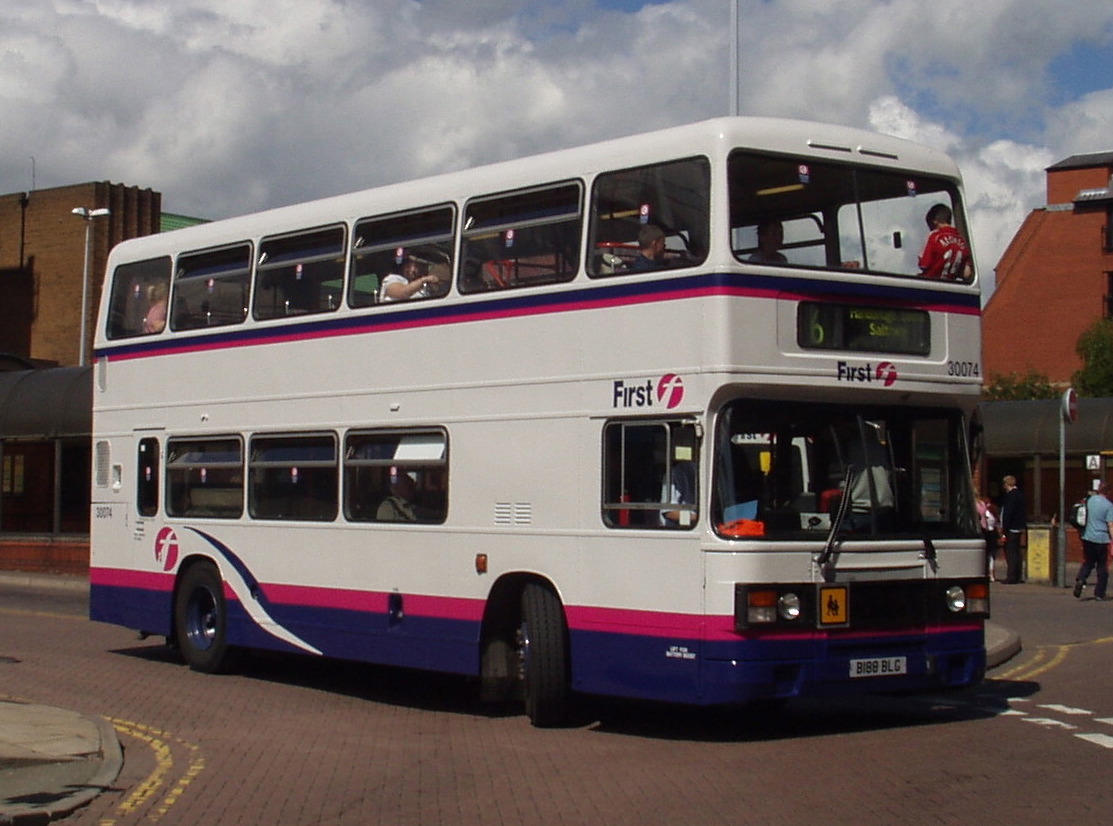
- ECW bodied Leyland Olympian at Chester Bus Exchange in July 2007
- Parent: FirstGroup
- Founded: June 1995; 31 years ago
- Ceased operation: 13 January 2013; 13 years ago
- Headquarters: Oldham, Greater Manchester, England
- Service area: Cheshire; Merseyside
- Service type: Bus operator
- Hubs: Chester; Birkenhead; Wrexham
- Depots: 2
- Fleet: 110 (January 2013)
- Website: Official website

First Chester & Wirral was a British bus operator operating in the Cheshire and Merseyside regions between February 1990 and January 2013. It was a subsidiary of FirstGroup.

== History ==
In February 1990, the Chester, Ellesmere Port and Rock Ferry depots of Crosville Motor Services were sold by the Drawlane Group to Potteries Motor Traction with 150 buses.

It was included in the sale of Potteries Motor Traction to Badgerline, which in June 1995 became part of FirstBus. The company was later split, with the original Potteries Motor Traction becoming First Staffordshire & South Cheshire and the north Cheshire and Wirral operations, First Chester & The Wirral.

From January 2006, First began downsizing its former PMT operations, withdrawing various routes across Cheshire and the Wirral and negotiating the closure of its Ellesmere Port depot upon the expiry of its lease. Arriva North West and Wales stepped in to replace most of the routes withdrawn by First, operated with a peak vehicle requirement of 17.

On 19 June 2007, the ChesterBus municipal bus company was purchased from Chester City Council and integrated into the Chester depot.

First Chester & The Wirral remained part of First Potteries until 2010, when the company was reorganised, with the Staffordshire operation reporting to First Midlands and the Chester & Wirral operations to First Manchester.

On 12 November 2012, First Chester & Wirral was sold to Stagecoach Merseyside & South Lancashire with 110 vehicles and 290 staff. The sale was concluded on 13 January 2013, with operations being renamed to Stagecoach in Chester & Wirral and operating as part of Stagecoach Merseyside and South Lancashire.
