= Star Trak (service) =

Defunct real-time bus timetable information system

- Parent: Leicester City Council
- Service area: Leicester, Derby, University of Derby and East Midlands Airport
- Service type: Bus Real Time Information
- Website: www.star-trak.co.uk

Star Trak was a real-time bus information system operating in Leicester and Derby between 2000 and 2011. It was run by the Leicester City Council.

== History ==
Star Trak was created in 2000 by Leicester City Council to provide its citizens with a real-time system. The system counts down the departure time to the next bus's arrival. In 2004, the system was in use for over thirty bus routes. At that time, the system was a partnership between Leicester City Council, Leicestershire County Council, Arriva Midlands, First, Kinchbus, and Trentbarton.

The current system is provided by Germany's INIT, specialists in transportation telematics and fare collection systems, and the signs are supplied by Swedish company Poltech.

Over the 10 years the system expanded to cover most Arriva and First Services in Leicester and Leicestershire. The system expanded to cover Derby and Derbyshire and Leicester City Council ran the system for these counties. Nottingham and Nottinghamshire then joined the system, but had a different type of sign that could show schedule information. This meant that more routes could be shown on the signs.

Nottingham City Council left the Star Trak consortium in October 2010. The system was discontinued on 31 January 2011 following a Arriva Midlands decision to withdraw from it. At the time, Leicester City Council stated that the move would save them £200,000 per year, and it blamed government cuts for being unable to invest in a replacement system.

== Routes covered by Star Trak ==
Star Trak covered most main routes run by Arriva Leicester and nearly all routes run by First Leicester. Arriva Derby and Trent Barton routes were covered within Derby City and County. Some of Kinch services are covered within Loughborough.

Routes on the Star Trak network within Leicester, Leicestershire, Derby and Derbyshire.

== Operation ==
Star Trak works by pin-pointing where the bus is and predicting where it is along the route and how far it is from the following stops.

The system uses satellites, GPS technology to pin point where the bus is along the route. This is sent by the buses using radio to Leicester City Council. The systems then work out where the bus is, and how far it is from the following stops. This is then sent to the signs either by Radio or GPRS to the signs. They then show the countdown to the next bus.

== Signs ==
There were several types of signs used in this system. These ranged from single window signs that just show the next bus time, Multi window that showed the route number and time. There were also 2 line signs that show the route number, Destination and time to next bus. Seen in Derby on the Arriva Derby 38, that have 3 lines, show route number, Destination and either countdown or schedule times.

There have been issues with some of the older times as they can only show the countdown times. If the on bus equipment fails or the driver doesn't log on correctly, schedule time is then shown. On the older signs, this cannot be shown as the signs have no capability to do this and show a Single Dot, like a full stop. This is often confused with the signs being faulty. The new signs are capable of showing a Schedule time and negate this issue.

You can tell if the time is Schedule or Realtime as Schedule is Hour and minutes, e.g. 12:45 and the Real time counts down in minutes, e.g. 23mins.

The signs use Radio Technology to receive the information. New signs now use GPRS technology.

== Star text ==
Star text was a text service that allows a bus user to type in a unique stop code, text it off and the bus times for that stop are sent to the mobile phone.

Leicester was one of the first cities to start using this service and brought it to the front. This has now been taken up countrywide by Traveline.

== Web ==
Star Trak had a fully inclusive website, www.star-trak.co.uk

The website uses a Map using Google Maps that brings up the route in an arrow form that shows the whole route on the Map. It shows all Realtime routes in the east midlands area and shows schedule routes in Leicester for all the main operators.

The website uses cookies to save your most used stops, but it will only be valid on the computer it looked at.

== Press coverage ==
In 2010 there have been several articles within the Leicester Mercury, Leicester's main evening newspaper. These have been mixed and have even called for the system to be scrapped. The value for these have been to sensationalise the system and the faults with the system. It was reported that the system is to be replaced by a newer system and had interviews printed from senior council officers confirming this point, but no date was shown.

Data from the system was used for a project by University of Leicester researchers in 2010.

In January 2011 rumours started and a leaked Leicester City Council Budget for 2011/2012 to the Leicester Mercury, that Star Trak was to be scrapped in Leicester with the loss of 4 Jobs. Proposed cut Article It isn't confirmed at this stage what will happen to the system in Derby City, Derbyshire and Leicestershire or with the Bus Company Partners. On 20 January 2011, Counciller Osman is Quoted in the same newspaper in an article about protests that Star Trak was to be scrapped and no new system put in its place at this time. Leicester Mercury article regarding scrapping Star Trak The Budget still hasn't been signed off by the full cabinet due to be signed off at the end of February 2011. It looks from the article that the system will be cut quickly.
