= Busways Travel Services =

Bus operator in Tyne and Wear, England

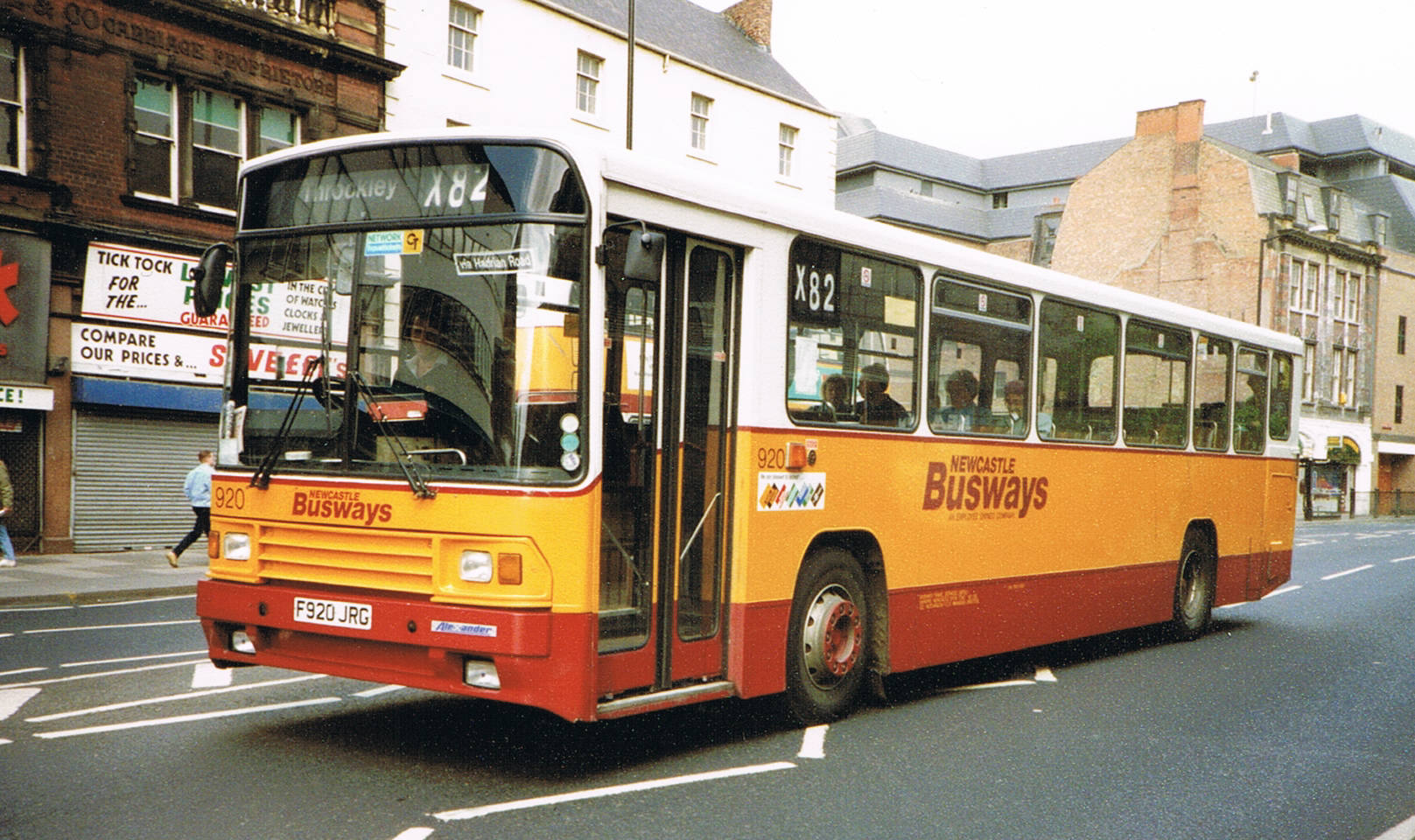
- A Newcastle Busways Alexander PS bodied Scania N113 in Newcastle upon Tyne
- Founded: October 1986; 39 years ago
- Ceased operation: July 1994; 31 years ago
- Headquarters: Sunderland, Tyne and Wear; England
- Service area: Tyne and Wear
- Service type: Bus and coach
- Depots: 4
- Fleet: 600+ (July 1994)

Busways Travel Services was a bus operator formed in 1986 which operated local and regional bus services in Tyne and Wear, England. The company was purchased by the Stagecoach Group in July 1994.

== History ==
=== Formation ===
In October 1986, to comply with the Transport Act 1985, the bus operations of the Tyne and Wear Passenger Transport Executive were transferred to a new legal entity named Busways Travel Services.

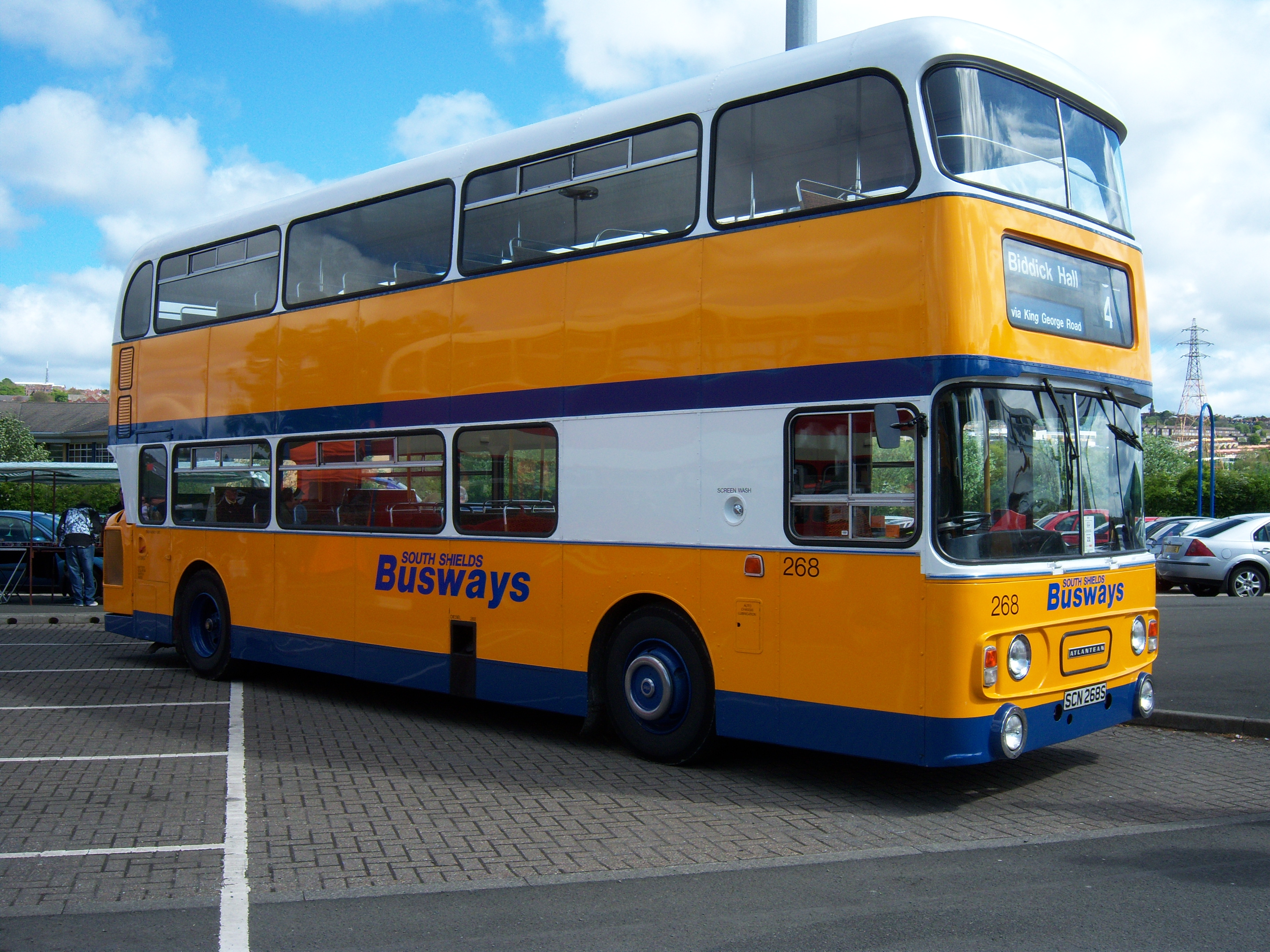
Preserved South Shields Busways Alexander bodied Leyland Atlantean at the 2009 MetroCentre Bus Rally

Busways divided its main services into four colour-coded divisions. Services operated out of Slatyford and Byker depots were branded as Newcastle and City Busways respectively, taking on a maroon livery, while South Shields and Sunderland depots' Busways operations were branded blue and green respectively. These divisions were eventually reduced to three with the merger of City Busways into Newcastle Busways in 1993. White-painted minibuses operated by each division were branded "Mini Busways" to allow them to be quickly transferred between divisions, while low-cost subsidiaries, such as Blue Bus, Economic and The Favourite, were also set up by Busways to compete with rival operators, such as Trimdon Motor Services, Go-Ahead Northern, the Tyne and Wear Omnibus Company (TWOC) and Welcome Passenger Service, on services across Tyne and Wear for passengers.

In May 1989, Busways Travel Services was sold to its employees in an employee share ownership plan (ESOP), with management owning 51% of shares and employees owning 49%. The newly privatised Busways made their first acquisition of a competing bus operator on 17 November 1989, purchasing the Tyne & Wear Omnibus Company, which had then recently been engaged in a bus war with Busways, from Go-Ahead Northern for £2 million (equivalent to £6,285,000 in 2023).

The sale of the Tyne and Wear Omnibus Company to Busways proved highly controversial with TWOC's 187 workers, with the company's Gateshead depot announced to close and workers being issued "precautionary" 90-day redundancy notices, before later being made to apply for new jobs at Busways; only two workers out of 33 applicants would get engineering jobs at Busways, while no ex-TWOC drivers were hired by Busways to operate former TWOC services. This eventually resulted in Busways being ruled to have unfairly dismissed TWOC workers by an industrial tribunal in June 1992.

By March 1994, the company was considering options of geographic expansion, merger, acquisition or sale to a national group. The company had become concerned at its proximity to the recently floated Go-Ahead Group, and the fact that United Automobile Services to the south, and Northumbria to the north, were also possible targets for the larger groups. It believed that independently it would struggle to defend the company against expansion by these neighbours in the future. The Busways board came to the conclusion that a merger with one of the larger groups was the only viable option.

=== Stagecoach ownership ===
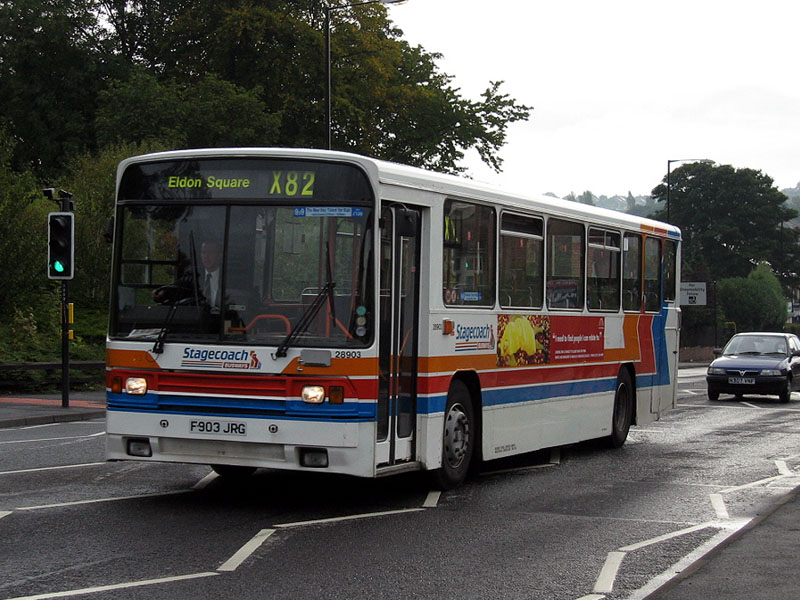
Alexander PS bodied Scania N113 in the first version of Stagecoach corporate livery with Busways fleet names

Stagecoach Holdings acquired Busways Travel Services for £27.5 million (equivalent to £69,088,000 in 2023) in July 1994. This takeover had to be accepted against two other national groups by Busways' 1,700 employee shareholders, 99% of which accepted, receiving between £4,700 (equivalent to £12,000 in 2023) and £13,800 (equivalent to £35,000 in 2023) in windfall gains based on their length of service.

Similar to Stagecoach subsidiaries such as Cleveland Transit and GM Buses South, Busways initially retained its identity as an autonomous unit of the group between 1994 and 1995, with the fleet carrying new straplines reading 'Part of the Stagecoach Group'. On eventual adoption of Stagecoach's group livery of base white with red, orange and blue stripes from July 1995, the Busways, Blue Bus Service and Economic names were retained by the company. This rebrand was accelerated with a £6 million (equivalent to £15,783,000 in 2023) investment in 40 Alexander RL bodied Volvo Olympians and 17 Alexander PS type bodied Volvo B10Ms that were delivered between late 1995 and early 1996, the largest single purchase of new vehicles by Busways since deregulation.

The Busways, Economic and Blue Bus names were eventually dropped with rebranding of the Stagecoach Group in 2000, with operations continuing under Stagecoach North East. The Busways name is retained today as the registered company name for the Stagecoach subsidiary.

==== Darlington Bus War involvement ====
In January 1994, employee owned Busways had been considering expanding in the Darlington area, although by March this study was suspended while other possible futures were being considered. In the months following the Stagecoach takeover, the Busways subsidiary was a key player in the Darlington Bus War.

== Operations ==
=== Economic ===
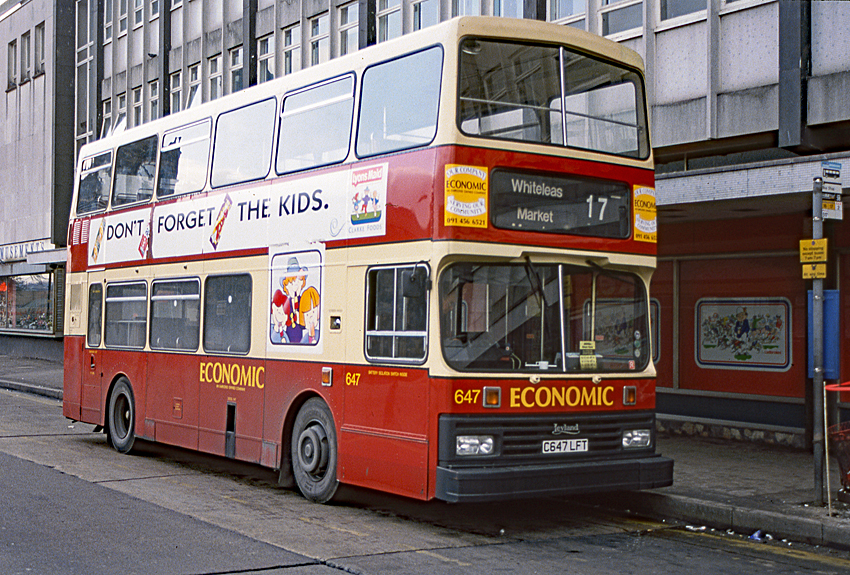
Economic-branded Alexander bodied Leyland Olympian in 1993

The name "Economic" had been used by the associated businesses of GR Anderson and EW Wilson of Whitburn for their services between Sunderland and South Shields. These had been acquired by Tyne & Wear PTE on 1 January 1975. Prior to deregulation, TWPTE had painted a Leyland Atlantean double-decker bus in the old Economic colours of maroon and off-white with black lining to mark the 60th anniversary of the business, and as deregulation approached, two brand-new Leyland Olympian double-deckers were delivered to the PTE in those colours, bearing gold "ECONOMIC" fleetnames. At deregulation, Economic was revived as the low-cost competitive operation of South Shields Busways, with Sunderland to South Shields services 505 and 506 becoming Economic routes E1 and E2.

=== Armstrong Galley ===
On 24 August 1973, Tyne & Wear PTE acquired two associated Newcastle-based businesses, R Armstrong (Bus Proprietor) Ltd. and Galley's Coaches Ltd., and immediately the "Armstrong Galley" name was adopted for the PTE's coaching and private hire division. Initially retaining the original PTE yellow and cream colours (of Newcastle Corporation), a new colour scheme of mid-blue with yellow, orange and red stripes was adopted around 1980. Armstrong Galley introduced a flagship service to London in the early 1980s, competing with National Express, using MCW Metroliner coaches branded as the "Non-Stop Clipper".

The Armstrong Galley operations continued unchanged with the creation of Busways in October 1986, however in the early 1990s, it expanded into low-cost bus operation, culminating in an "Armstrong Galley Buses" operation being set up. After the Stagecoach takeover, Armstrong Galley's bus operations were closed down, with the coach operation later sold to East Yorkshire Motor Services' Tyneside Coach Travel subsidiary in late 1996.

== Fleet ==
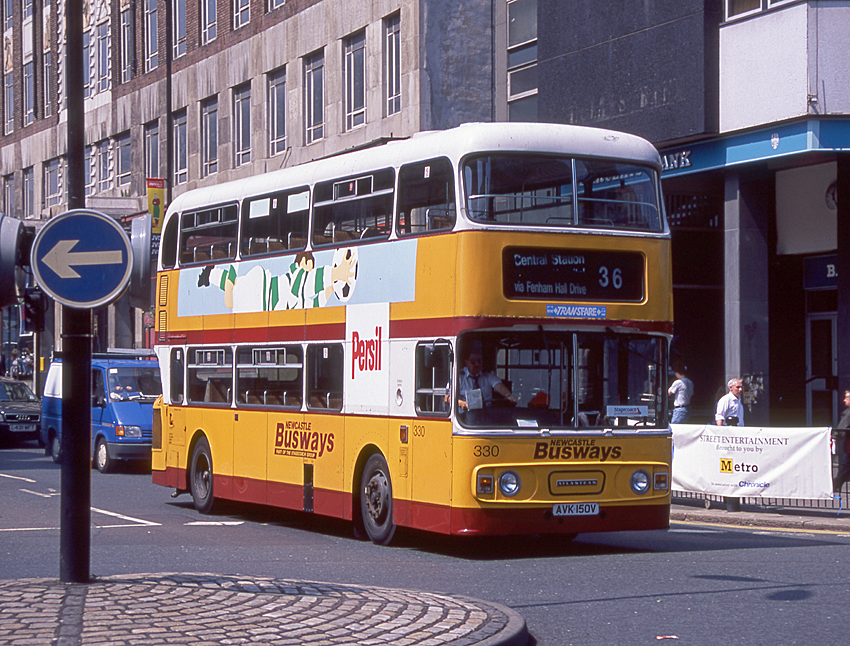
Newcastle Busways Alexander bodied Leyland Atlantean with Stagecoach ownership logo straplines in 1996

As of the purchase by Stagecoach in July 1994, Busways Travel Services was operating a fleet of over 600 buses based at four depots.

Busways inherited a large fleet of panoramic windowed Leyland Atlanteans and Daimler Fleetlines from Tyne and Wear PTE, although these had been supplemented in 1986 by 65 Alexander RH bodied Leyland Olympians. Busways also inherited several Bristol LH single-deckers from the PTE, many of which were scrapped or converted to driver trainers. Some examples survived into 1994, used in the main fleet, Blue Bus Services and Favourite Services, and the type was added to in this time with many second hand examples. In PTE ownership the company acquired several 1987 Mercedes-Benz 709D minibuses, and 1989 Leyland Lynxes.

In 1989 and 1991, employee owned Busways standardised on the Scania N113 chassis, on Northern Counties and Alexander RH double-deck bodies, and Alexander PS single-deck bodies. The double deck fleet was also added to with the purchase of Northern Counties-bodied 1987 Leyland Olympians from London Transport's Bexleybus operation. In November 1992, Busways moved into the midibus market, purchasing 20 Alexander Dash bodied Dennis Darts during a period of direct competition with Welcome Passenger Services, although 1993 batches were augmented with Plaxton bodied examples.
