= ChesterBus =

Former municipal bus company in Cheshire, England

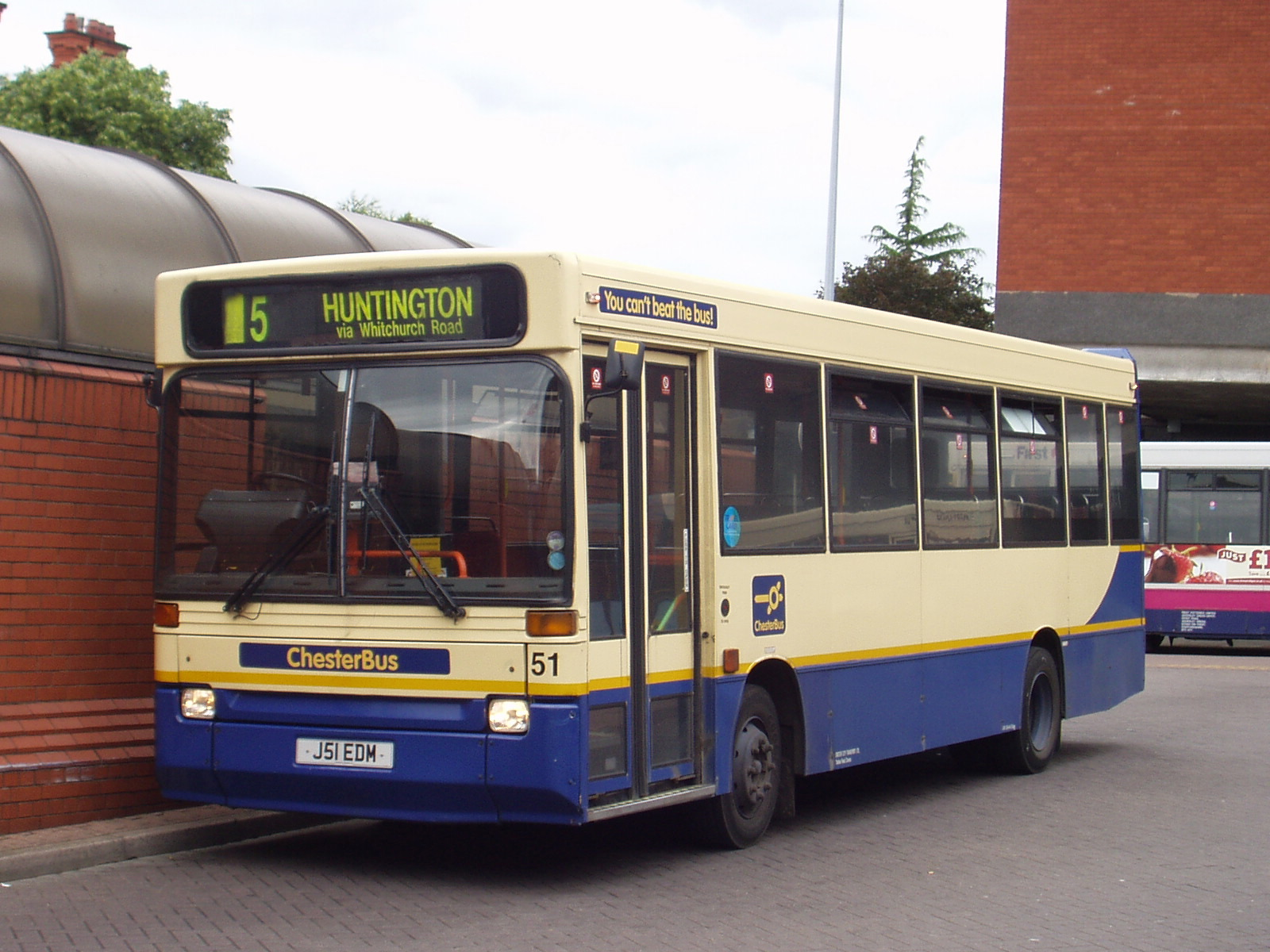
- Plaxton Pointer bodied Dennis Dart in Chester in June 2007
- Parent: Chester City Council
- Founded: 1930; 96 years ago
- Ceased operation: 19 June 2007; 19 years ago
- Headquarters: Chester
- Service area: Cheshire
- Service type: Bus operator
- Depots: 1
- Fleet: 84 (June 2007)

ChesterBus was an English municipal bus company operating services in the city of Chester and across the county of Cheshire. It was owned by the Chester City Council.

== History ==
Chester City Transport commenced operating bus services in Chester in 1930. It was operated as part of Chester City Council. To comply with the Transport Act 1985, the bus operation was transferred to a separate company in 1986. It continued to trade as Chester City Transport until rebranded as ChesterBus in April 2005.

In July 2006, Chester City Council placed the business up for sale.

In October 2006, Arriva North West & Wales registered a network of services to commence in January 2007, which duplicated a number of ChesterBus's routes. On 11 October 2006, Chester City Council commenced an action in the High Court against Arriva, claiming that the registrations were anti-competitive under the Competition Act 1998, and asking for an injunction requiring Arriva to de-register them. In December, the registrations were cancelled though revised registrations for the 1/1A and 15 were made in January 2007.

Chester City Council's claim centred on the allegation that Arriva were abusing a dominant position, but in a judgement dated 15 June 2007, it was held that Arriva had not been demonstrated to hold a dominant position, and the claim was therefore dismissed.

Four days later on 19 June, ChesterBus, by then consisting of a fleet of 84 buses and facing over £200,000 in legal fees from the collapsed trial, was sold to First Chester & The Wirral. The FirstGroup later sold the operation to the Stagecoach Group for £4.5 million in 2012, who now operate in Chester as part of Stagecoach Merseyside and South Lancashire.
