= Darlington Bus War =

Period of heavy competition between bus operators in Darlington, England

The Darlington Bus War was a series of events between 1986 and 1995 in the UK bus industry in the town of Darlington, County Durham, culminating in the wholesale entry of Stagecoach Group onto the Darlington bus scene, and the collapse of Darlington Corporation Transport.

In November 1994, the events in Darlington and in other areas prompted the Director General of Fair Trading to request the Monopolies & Mergers Commission to investigate the supply of bus services in the North East.

== Timeline ==
=== Deregulation ===
As a result of bus deregulation in 1986, the National Bus Company (NBC) as the largest regional bus operator was split into pieces and sold off, and municipal bus companies were being put into stand-alone companies, with many being privatised. In March 1986 the bus operations of Darlington Borough Council (DBC) were incorporated as the Darlington Transport Company Ltd (DTC), although not initially sold.

In August 1986, NBC subsidiary United Automobile Services introduced a small number of new hail and ride town services in Darlington using Mercedes–Benz minibuses under the 'Roadranger' livery in competition with Darlington Transport. These services (covering Firth Moor and the Whinbush areas initially) proved successful, so shortly afterwards United purchased more Mercedes, and some Dodge S56, minibuses and hugely expanded the minibus network which resulted in a doubling of services across the whole town and intense competition with Darlington Transport. From 1988 to 1992 many requests and attempts were made to sell DTC, all coming to nothing. Your Bus, another operator set up by ex-United employees, entered into Darlington in May 1993, prompting a response from United with further registrations, later described as predatory and anti-competitive by the Competition Commission. By 1993, with 3 competing operators, concerns had been raised over 'over-bussing' and congestion in the town centre. By 1994 all three operators were making financial losses.

Due to its financial state, DTC was put up for sale in July 1994. In response to the sale announcement, United registered additional services on DTC's routes.

=== Busways interest ===
In early 1994 independent Busways had explored the possibility of entering into the Darlington market, as a possible option for expansion. This was shelved as bids from major groups for the Busways company were considered. Busways were sold to Stagecoach Group in July 1994. After a meeting with Stagecoach executives, the decision was made to enter Darlington, either through a bid for DTC, or as a new operator. Accordingly, Busways as a subsidiary company set up Stagecoach Darlington, and registered a small network in Darlington in September 1994, due to start in December, as a result of concerns over availability of drivers. Exclusive bids for DTC by Stagecoach had been previously declined.

=== Bidding process ===
According to government rules, DBC were obliged to sell DTC by competitive tender. After initial enquiries, from 11 initial interested parties, 3 were short listed as preferred bidders for DTC on 14 October 1994:

- Yorkshire Traction: £1.5m
- Busways: £1.0 million
- Badgerline: £0.8 million

As United were already a competitor in the town, they were barred from the bid process on competition grounds. Accordingly, on 24 October 1994 DBC selected Yorkshire Traction as the preferred bidder.

=== Collapse of Darlington Transport Company ===
On learning of the successful bid by Yorkshire Traction, the drivers union of DTC made representations to Busways that Yorkshire Traction were not their preferred bidder, and the majority of drivers would probably be interested in joining Busways' new operation. Accordingly, with worries over recruitment and training now reduced, Busways registered all of DTC's commercial routes, and commenced a recruitment drive.

Busways quickly recruited over 60% of DTC's drivers by 7 November. Amid concerns that DTC would not be able to fulfil its services due to driver shortage, and with concerns over United having a free hand in Darlington if DTC collapsed, Busways requested an advance on their registration date. This was refused. Busways exploited a loophole in the regulations, and began operating free buses on their Darlington network. Busways called in several vehicles from its other subsidiaries, and repainted several of its surplus Leyland Atlanteans into Stagecoach livery.

In response to Busways initial route network, and on commencement of driver recruitment, Yorkshire Traction withdrew their bid for DTC on 2 November. DBC were unable to reach a sale with any other buyer, and Busways declined a new approach. With no other buyers, difficulty running their services due to driver shortage, and ongoing concern at the financial viability of DTC in the long term, DTC was placed into receivership on 9 November 1994, with all services withdrawn by 11 November. Due to DTC's collapse, Busways was then granted permission to start running revenue collecting services from 28 November.

=== Aftermath and inquiry conclusions ===
Your Bus ceased operations on 16 December, selling its vehicles to West Midlands Travel. This left just Busways and United operating in Darlington. On the instigation of DBC, still concerned at over-bussing and congestion, both companies agreed to reduce service levels by March 1995.

In the summary of the competition inquiry into the larger issues in bus services in the north east, concerning the collapse of DTC, the commission stated:

It was the combination of Busways' actions in recruiting so many of DTC's drivers so quickly, registering services on all its routes and running free services which caused DTC's final collapse. We find these actions to be predatory, deplorable and against the public interest.

— Monopolies and Mergers Commission

It stated that while registration of routes and recruitment of competitors drivers was not against the spirit of deregulation, it commented that the scale of Busways actions were unprecedented, and were attributable to Busways considerable dominance in the region, and ability to absorb losses due to free services.

=== Busways response ===
In response to the inquiry report, Busways defended its actions in launching free services as being intended to prevent United gaining a monopoly in Darlington after the collapse of DTC, and only expected to run free buses until the traffic commissioner could bring forward its registrations. It denied poaching DTC's drivers highlighting that the drivers had instigated contact with Busways first, when it became clear Busways would not be purchasing DTC. It contended it had always intended to enter the Darlington market through purchase of DTC if an appropriate price was agreed, to preserve goodwill and prevent a driver shortage of their already intended entrance. It also contended that Yorkshire Traction's bid was unrealistic given the market, and contended that its price indicated that Yorkshire Traction anticipated being the only eventual operator in Darlington, thereby possibly acting as an agent for United. It contended that Yorkshire Traction's attempts to reduce its bid while still only aware of Stagecoach's initial small registration, supported this belief.

Stagecoach management broadly agreed with the actions of Busways as being fair in the environment of deregulated bus services and within the confines of the rules governing registration of services and the instruction of compulsory tender sale of municipal bus companies. It did concede that possibly the free bus services had not been necessary and it could have achieved market entry by waiting for the traffic commissioner to advance its registrations once evidence of DTC's impending failure came to light.

Stagecoach saved approximately £100,000 in the cost of market entry in not purchasing DTC, even after 2 weeks of free operation and paying bonuses to DTC drivers for joining Busways. In November 1994, Stagecoach completed the purchase of Cleveland Transit, and in December the purchase of Hartlepool Transport. Stagecoach Darlington was later transferred to Transit under the umbrella of Stagecoach North East.

=== Present day ===
Yorkshire Traction eventually came under Stagecoach ownership, while United Automobile Services eventually came under the ownership of Arriva. In June 2007, Stagecoach sold its Darlington operation to Arriva, leaving Darlington bus services solely in the hands of Arriva, apart from a handful of council supported routes that were tendered to smaller operators. Stagecoach chairman Brian Souter later went on record to say the negative impact of Stagecoach's actions had outweighed any financial gain it had made from operating in Darlington.

Since the bus wars, bus use in Darlington has declined from over 10 million journeys a year (in 2001) to 6.6 million (in 2014).

In 2023, after Arriva decided to withdraw the 12 service to Hurworth, Darlington Borough Council put the route out to commercial tender. The route was won by Stagecoach North East, the successor to Stagecoach Busways, marking the return of the operator to Darlington.

== See also ==
- Stagecoach North East
- Stagecoach Yorkshire
- Arriva North East
