= Transport Act 1985 =

Act of the Parliament of the United Kingdom

Transport Act 1985 (Note: Section 140(1).)
- Act of Parliament
- Parliament of the United Kingdom
- Long title: An Act to amend the law relating to road passenger transport; to make provision for the transfer of the operations of the National Bus Company to the private sector; to provide for the reorganisation of passenger transport in the public sector; to provide for local and central government financial support for certain passenger transport services and travel concessions; to make further provision with respect to the powers of London Regional Transport; to make new provision with respect to the constitution, powers and proceedings of the Transport Tribunal; to make provision with respect to grants payable under section 92 of the Finance Act 1965; to establish a Disabled Persons Transport Advisory Committee; and for connected purposes.
- Citation: 1985 c. 67
- Introduced by: Nicholas Ridley MP (Commons)
- Territorial extent: England and Wales; Scotland (in part); Northern Ireland (in part); (Note: Section 140(4)–(6).)

Dates
- Royal assent: 30 October 1985
- Commencement: Various (Note: Section 140(2)–(3).)
Other legislation
Amends	London Hackney Carriages Act 1843; Town Police Clauses Act 1847; Pensions (Increase) Act 1971; Restrictive Trade Practices Act 1976; Energy Act 1976; Public Passenger Vehicles Act 1981; Road Traffic Regulation Act 1984
Amended by	Road Traffic (Consequential Provisions) Act 1988; Statute Law (Repeals) Act 1989; Tribunals and Inquiries Act 1992; Statute Law (Repeals) Act 1993; Goods Vehicles (Licensing of Operators) Act 1995; Statute Law (Repeals) Act 1995; Audit Commission Act 1998; Private Hire (London) Act 1998; Postal Services Act 2000; Statute Law (Repeals) Act 2004; Railways Act 2005; Statute Law (Repeals) Act 2008; Infrastructure Act 2015; Wales Act 2017; Bus Services Act 2017

Status: Amended

Text of statute as originally enacted

Revised text of statute as amended

Text of the Transport Act 1985 as in force today (including any amendments) within the United Kingdom, from legislation.gov.uk.

The Transport Act 1985 (c. 67) is an act of the Parliament of the United Kingdom. It introduced privatised and deregulated bus services throughout Great Britain and came into effect in October 1986.

The act was created as a response to growing concern about the environmental effect the private transportation was having and the public's objection to an increase in road construction. The act was introduced by Nicholas Ridley and it committed to reduce the amount the public paid for commercial objects. This was achieved by reducing the control governments had of bus systems and reducing the subsidies to bus companies. The Conservative government also believed the removal of subsidies and local government control would lead to an increase in competition between companies. The deregulation of buses applied throughout Great Britain, excluding bus services in Greater London, and was led by the Conservative government. Public transport remains under direct public control in Northern Ireland.

== Deregulation and elimination of barriers ==
=== Proposal ===
In 1984 a proposal to deregulate local bus services was published in the white paper Buses and in more detailed consultation papers. Part I of the act brought these proposals into effect.

Deregulation, elimination of barriers, and the transfer to the private sector were some of the major changes the act established. Privatisation and bus deregulation came into effect on 26 October 1986. Local authorities were required to transfer their municipally-owned bus services to separate companies. Although most of these companies have since been privatised, with the exception of Lothian Buses in Edinburgh; a few other municipal bus companies remain today. The act also mandated that local governments publish statements of their own policies for bus services deemed socially vital that were not operated by commercial companies.

=== London ===
London faced a different type of deregulation. The standard deregulation that applied to other cities in the United Kingdom was not applied to bus services in Greater London; instead, the act brought about a system of franchised routes operated by private companies but managed by London Buses Ltd. This meant that, although the bus companies in London were privatised, London's government still retained the ability to regulate the companies. At the time the act was put into place, the London bus companies were governed by the London Regional Transport Act 1984.

=== Transport Act 1985: Deregulation (Part I) ===
Part I of the act removed, excluding London, the need for the required road service licence throughout the United Kingdom. Part I replaced service licensing with a system of registration. This caused licensing authorities losing many of their powers and made it possible for operators to register new routes. For an operator to register a new route the licensed operator had to supply the traffic commissioner with information of the proposed route, the timeline for the trip, stopping arrangements, the vehicles to be used, and the terminal points. In accordance with the act the traffic commissioner had to receive the registration at least 42 days prior to when the route is to be run. It was mandatory for the notice to go through the traffic commissioner for a licensed bus operator to operate. After approval, the operator was required to run the route according to the specifications provided in the registration.

Deregulation also led to firms being able to charge any fares they wish, run routes, and freely enter and leave the market. This was accomplished by reducing the amount of subsidies local governments could provide for services.

=== Transport Act 1985: Privatisation (Part II) ===
Privatisation proposals were put forth to change the structure of the bus industry. The bus industry was managed mainly by public sector companies in the years prior to 1985. Privatisation was introduced by the Conservative government as a way to achieve better access to private capital and more committed management. In order to achieve this goal, the Conservative government made it so local governments could only provide subsidies for services and prohibited subsidies that would promote low fares.

=== Other provisions ===
School minibuses which are used to transport people are covered by a Section 19 permit scheme. The reference to "Section 19" relates to the Transport Act 1985.

== Aftermath ==
The act changed how bus services were run in the United Kingdom. The act introduced the largest change in the framework of bus services in over five decades and it replaced the prior publicly owned and highly regulated bus service with a largely competitive commercial system. Additionally, the removal of subsidies made it so different firms had to bid on the right to operate with subsidized services.

== Amendments ==
=== Travel Concessions (Eligibility) Act 2002 ===
The Travel Concessions (Eligibility) Act 2002 equalised the ages for men and women for eligibility for travel concessions in the 1985 act. The 2002 act lowered the age for men to be eligible for travel concessions under the act from 65 to 60, while keeping the age for eligibility for women at 60.

At the time of the passage of the 2002 act, approximately 1,000,000 men benefitted from the change. The 2002 act followed legal challenges under the Sex Discrimination Act 1975.

Certain MPs raised concerns that concessionary schemes would be withdrawn unless additional funding was provided.

== See also ==
- Bus deregulation in Great Britain
- Municipal bus company
- List of former municipal bus companies of the United Kingdom
