= History of the PTE bus operations =

Passenger transport executive bus operations

The passenger transport executive (PTE) bus operations were the bus operating divisions of the passenger transport executives in the United Kingdom. In 1986 they underwent a process of deregulation and privatisation, forming some of the largest private bus companies in the UK outside London, with all being sold to their employees or management. Despite their relative size and lucrative operating areas, none of the companies survived beyond the late 1990s, with all falling into the hands of the major bus groups, who had their origins in privatised regional subsidiaries of the former National Bus Company and the Scottish Bus Group.

== Background ==
The first passenger transport executives (PTEs) and passenger transport authorities (PTAs) were established by the Transport Act 1968.

The PTEs were local authority bodies responsible for running transport operations in their respective regions, accountable to the PTAs. Although trams, underground trains and light rail systems were included, the majority of transport operations controlled by the PTEs were bus services.

== Former municipal bus companies absorbed into passenger transport executives ==
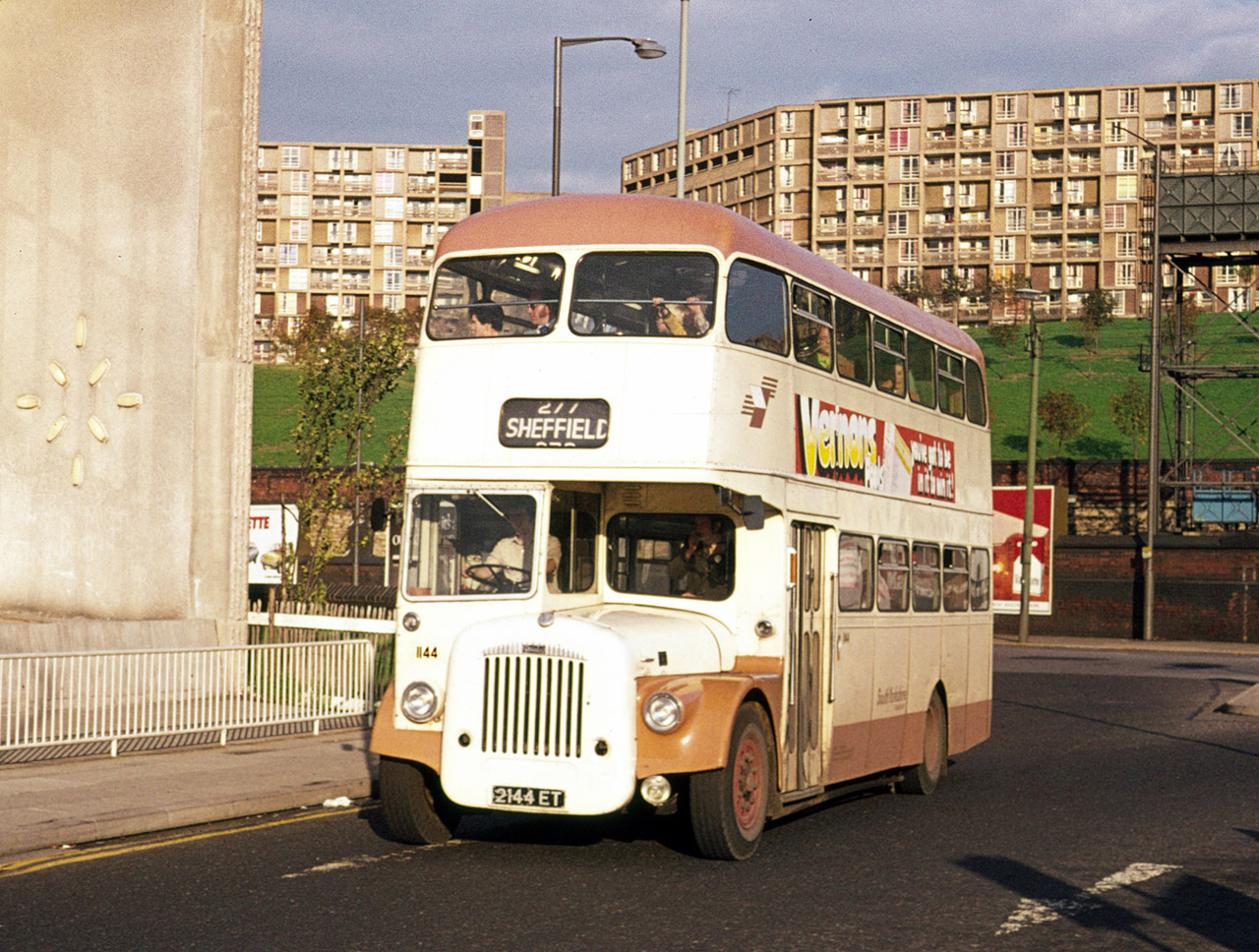
South Yorkshire PTE Charles H Roe bodied Daimler CVG6 in Sheffield in September 1976

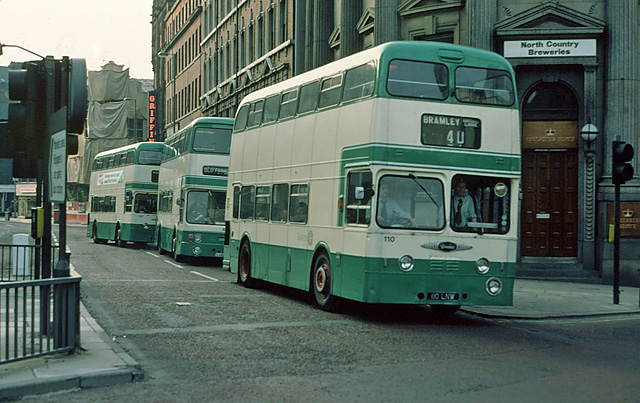
West Yorkshire PTE Daimler Fleetlines in Leeds in August 1979

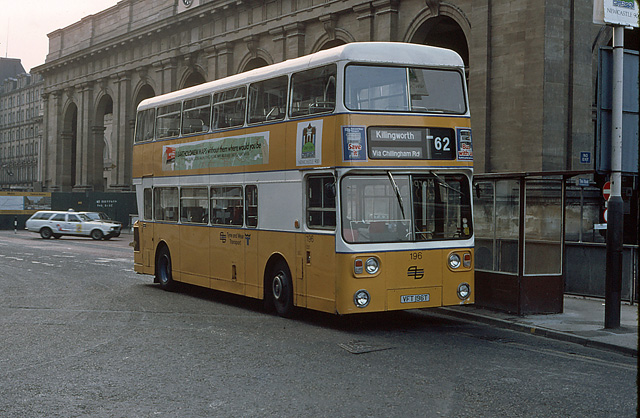
Tyne and Wear PTE Metro Cammell Weymann bodied Leyland Atlantean at Newcastle station in June 1980

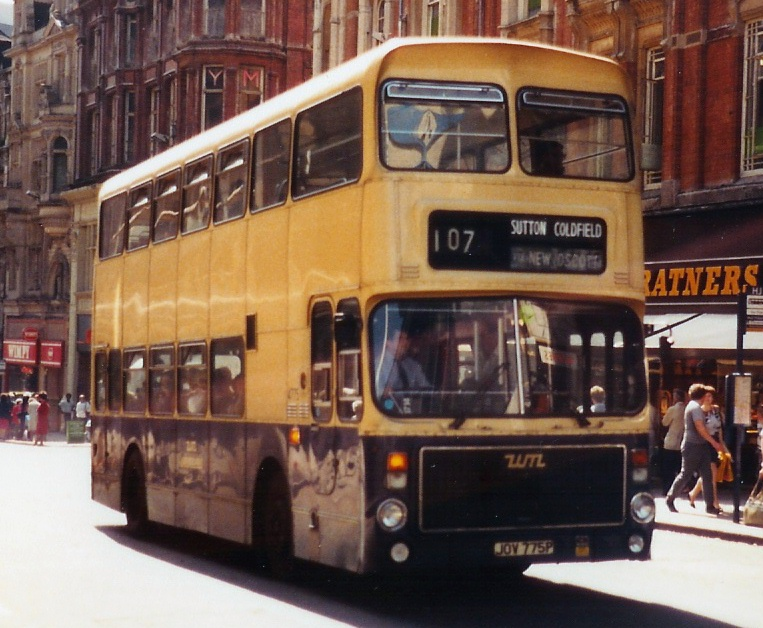
West Midlands PTE Alexander AV bodied Volvo Ailsa B55 in Birmingham in 1982

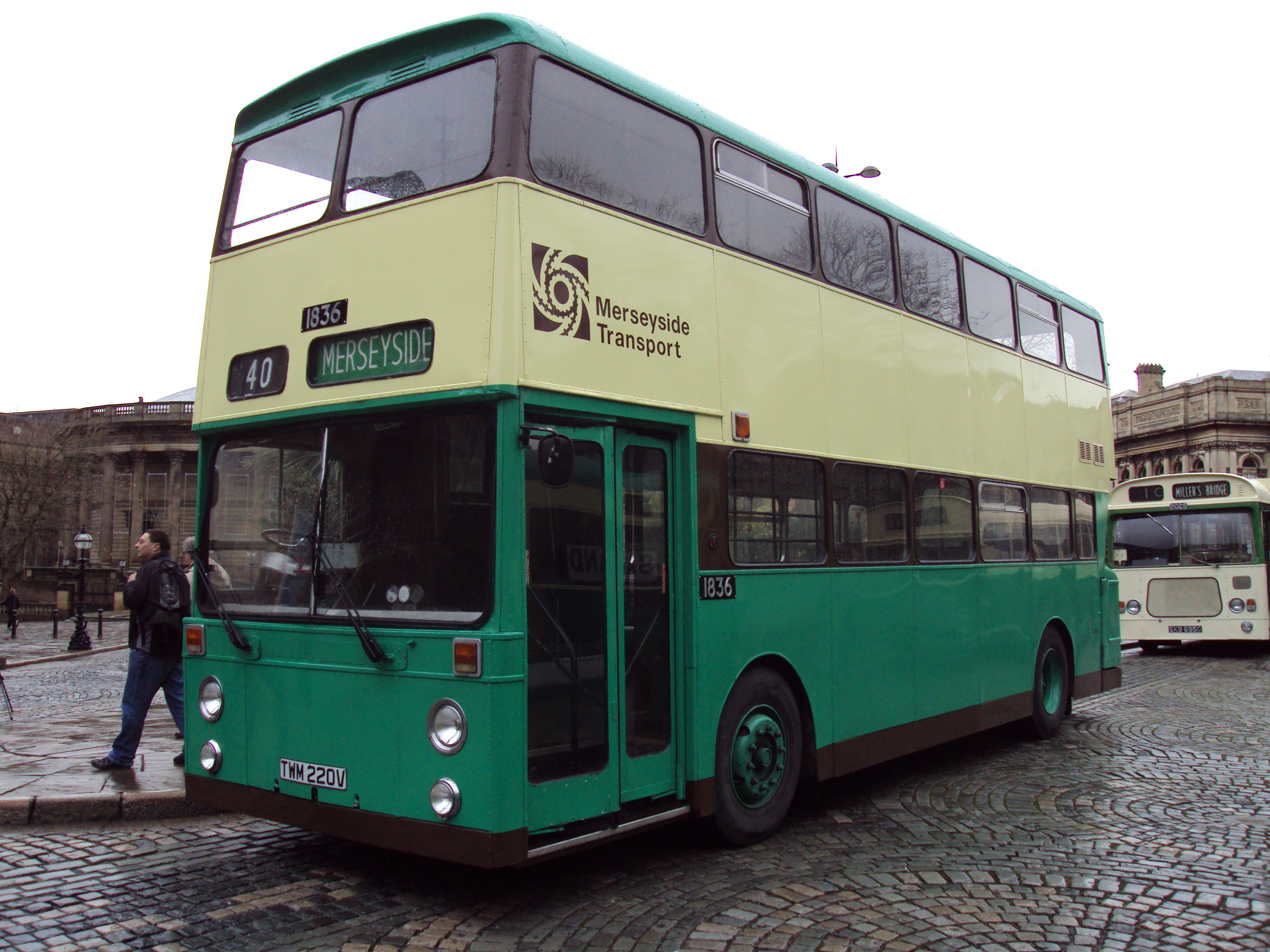
Preserved Merseyside Transport East Lancashire Coachbuilders bodied Leyland Atlantean in November 2009

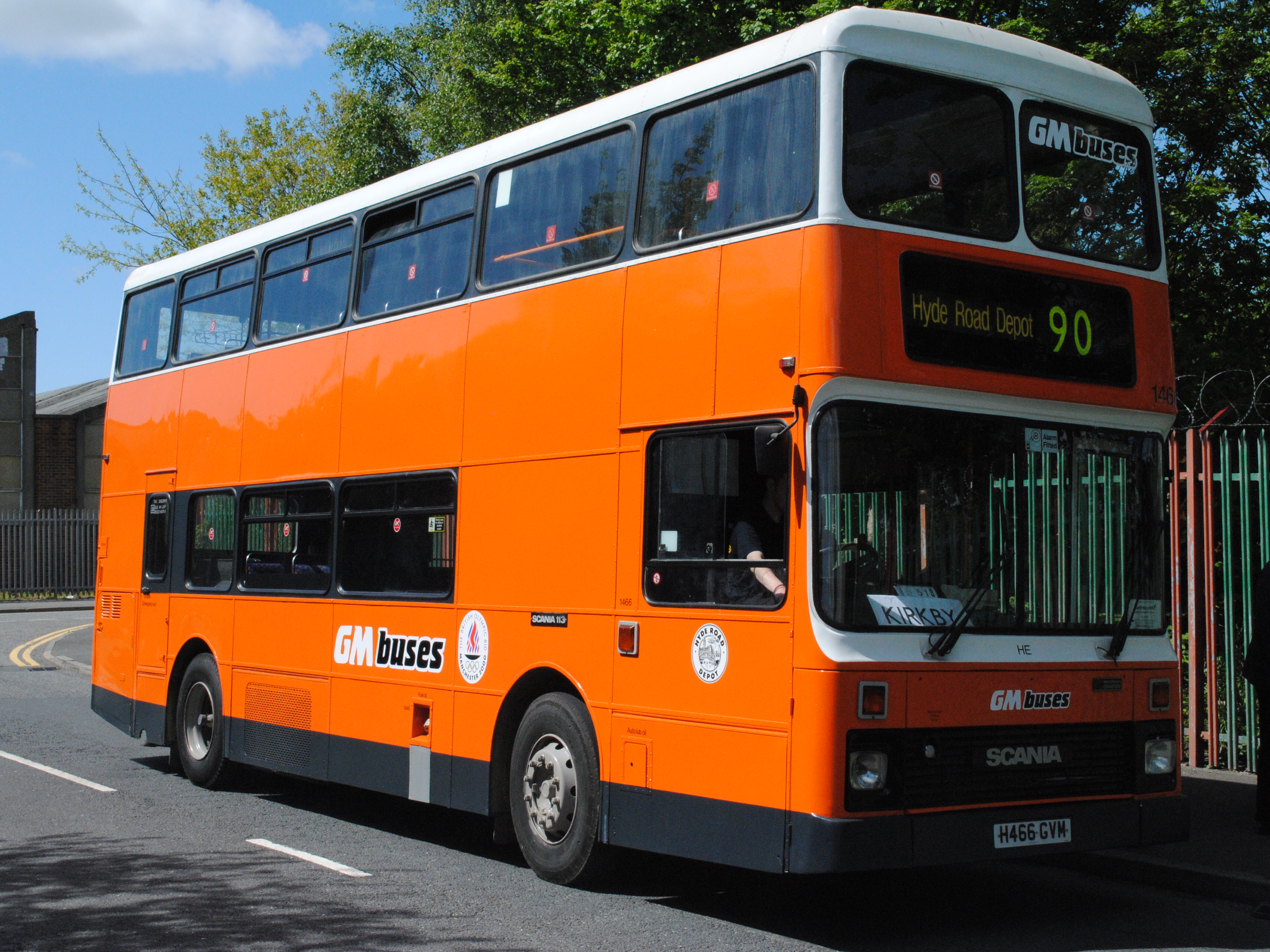
Preserved GM Buses Northern Counties Palatine bodied Scania N113DRB in Kirkby in June 2013

Many municipal bus companies in the largest conurbations came under the control of passenger transport executives following the Transport Act 1968. The following is a list of the seven PTEs established in either 1968 or 1974, and the municipal bus companies which became part of combined bus fleets.

- Merseyside (1969)
  - Birkenhead
  - Liverpool
  - St Helens (1974)
  - Southport (1974)
  - Wallasey
- SELNEC (South East Lancashire North East Cheshire, 1969), later Greater Manchester (1974)
  - Ashton-under-Lyne
  - Bolton
  - Bury
  - Leigh
  - Manchester
  - Oldham
  - Ramsbottom
  - Rochdale
  - Salford
  - Stalybridge, Hyde, Mossley and Dukinfield
  - Stockport
  - Wigan (1974)
- South Yorkshire (1974)
  - Doncaster
  - Rotherham
  - Sheffield
- Strathclyde (1972)
  - Glasgow
- Tyneside (1969), later Tyne and Wear (1974)
  - Newcastle upon Tyne
  - South Shields
  - Sunderland (1973)
- West Midlands (1969)
  - Birmingham
  - Coventry (1974)
  - Dudley Midland Red operations (1973)
  - Walsall
  - West Bromwich
  - Wolverhampton
- West Yorkshire (1974)
  - Bradford
  - Halifax
  - Huddersfield
  - Leeds

== Deregulation ==
In 1986 as a result of deregulation of bus services all PTEs were compelled to transfer their bus operations to "arms length" public transport companies.

This meant that the PTE/PTA could no longer regulate the routes and fares of the bus operators, nor could they prevent (legal) competition from external operators. The PTEs moved to a role of maintaining common facilities and financing less profitable but socially necessary services, although these had to go to open tender.

As a result of the split, all bus operations were re-branded:

- South Yorkshire as SYT (South Yorkshire Transport)
- West Yorkshire as Yorkshire Rider
- West Midlands as West Midlands Travel
- Strathclyde Transport as Strathclyde Buses
- Greater Manchester as GM Buses (split into North and South divisions in 1993)
- Merseyside Transport as Merseybus
- Tyne and Wear as Busways

The rebranding served to underline the new separation of responsibilities between the PTEs and the bus companies. In order to promote competition, the GM Buses operation was split in two in 1993.

== Privatisation ==
All the arms length bus companies were privatised by 1994:

- SYT sold in 1993 to employees
- Yorkshire Rider sold in 1988 in a management buyout
- West Midlands Travel sold in 1991 as an Employee Share Ownership Plan (ESOP)
- Strathclyde Buses sold in 1993 to employees
- GM Buses North sold in 1994 in a management buyout
- GM Buses South sold in 1994 in a management buyout
- Merseybus sold in 1993 to employees as MTL (Merseyside Transport Limited)
- Busways sold in 1989 as an ESOP

== Competitive strategies ==
=== Competition with new companies ===
As a result of deregulation, all the new bus companies faced competition from both regional operators and small independents. Some of the biggest competition occurred in Liverpool, with competition with Merseybus from North Western and generally professional medium to large-sized independents like CMT Buses, Fareway, Liverbus and Liverline. When Merseybus was sold to its management and employees and transformed into MTL it acquired most of these competitors, most notably Fareway and Liverbus with Liverline acquired by British Bus and integrated into its North Western operation.

Several PTEs faced competition from operators set up by former PTE employees made redundant during deregulation and/or privatisation. Several new competitors appealed to local customers by resurrecting former municipal company liveries which had disappeared with creation of the PTEs.

=== Competition by the new companies ===
As PTEs had historically held operating areas limited by authority boundaries, expansion into neighbouring areas was a viable strategy. Busways had looked to expand into other areas, notably Darlington. This was put on hold as the company was sold to Stagecoach Group, although the Busways company proceeded to immediately renew interest in Darlington, resulting in the events of the Darlington Bus War. Strathclyde Buses merged with the neighbouring ex Scottish Bus Group operator Kelvin Central Buses.

Some companies competed by setting up low cost units to compete for tendered services, such as Blue Bus and TWOC of Busways, and Merseyrider of Merseybus. West Midlands Travel set up an express coach service with London Regional Transport to compete with National Express, who would ironically later purchase WMT.

One of the largest pieces of competition came from competition between MTL and GM Buses South, with both operators setting up operations in each other's areas. This led to both operators losing money, and was ended in a gentleman's agreement. A similar tit for tat occurred between SYT and West Riding Buses, using investment in Compass Travel and new operation Sheffield & District respectively.

Several of the companies had difficulties in competing or upgrading their fleets due to repayments due to be made on loans made to finance the privatisations.

Stagecoach Group adopted a strategy of taking minority stakes in the new companies. At Mainline, a 20% stake was taken to assist in financing fleet upgrades, and to give Stagecoach first refusal in any event that the company was sold. Stagecoach also took a 20% stake in SB Holdings, Strathclyde's owning company, ostensibly to prevent imminent competition from Stagecoach West Scotland. Following a Monopolies & Mergers Commission inquiry investigating the Darlington Bus War, Stagecoach sold its stakes in both SBL Holdings and Mainline to FirstGroup.

== Sell out to the major groups ==
Despite their large fleets and high density operating areas, most of the former PTE groups were eventually surpassed by the growth of the emerging national bus groups. MTL was arguably the most successful former PTE, acquiring one of the former London Buses subsidiaries, London Northern (and expanding the operation), and securing two rail franchises (Merseyrail Electrics and Regional Railways North East), surviving the longest. However, even MTL was later declared bankrupt in 1999, and the majority of the business was acquired by Arriva.

FirstGroup was by far the most successful national group at acquiring former PTE bus companies. The former PTE companies were sold to national groups as follows:

- Mainline (ex SYT) sold to First South Yorkshire in 1998
- Yorkshire Rider sold to Badgerline in 1994
- West Midlands Travel sold to National Express in 1995
- Strathclyde Buses sold to First Glasgow in 1996
- GM Buses North sold to First Manchester in 1996
- GM Buses South sold to Stagecoach Manchester in 1996
- MTL bought as a bankrupt concern by Arriva in 2000
- Busways sold to Stagecoach North East in 1994

== Liveries ==
As a result of the rebranding, nearly all the bus companies produced bright new liveries, to contrast with the more understated liveries of the PTE operations.

Several companies proceeded to make their services appear more local, by introducing local branding. Busways introduced different coloured stripes and location names. Yorkshire Rider branded its buses with a depot strapline. Once privatised, SYT (as Mainline) introduced local brands (later dropped). Merseybus, once privatised, introduced local branding for its services in Wirral and Southport. Privatised West Midlands Travel maintained a network wide livery.

All PTE acquisitions by Arriva, First and Stagecoach were quickly repainted into the respective corporate liveries. Busways livery survived for a few years after purchase. National Express rebranded the West Midlands Travel business as Travel West Midlands with a revised mostly white livery, latterly resurrecting a Coventry identity, Travel Coventry. The local company names persisted within the corporate schemes until the trend of regional re-grouping along geographic lines.

== See also ==
- Municipal bus companies
