= First South Yorkshire & Midlands =

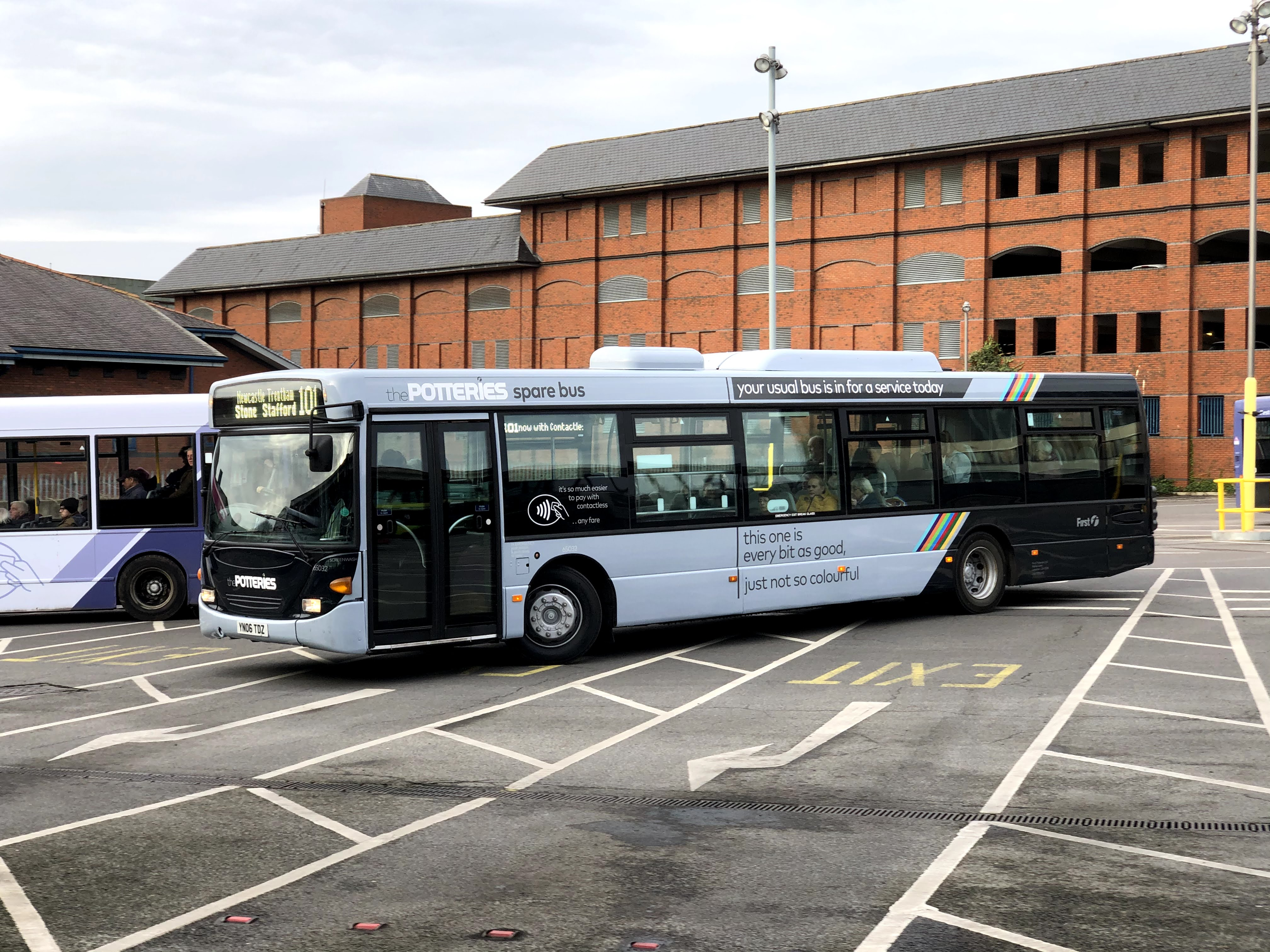
- One of First Potteries Scania Omnicitys
- Founded: 1999 (as First Midlands); 1 June 2020 (FSY&M)
- Headquarters: Abbey Lane, Leicester
- Locale: Stoke-On-Trent, Leicester, Sheffield, Doncaster
- Service area: English Midlands, Yorkshire and the Humber
- Service type: Urban and interurban bus services
- Operator: FirstGroup
- Chief executive: Rob Hughes, Operations Director
- Website: http://www.firstgroup.com

First Manchester, Midlands & South Yorkshire is an operating unit of FirstGroup operating in the English Midlands, Manchester and South Yorkshire. The unit was formed in 2008 with the merger of the management and administration of First Potteries, First Worcester and First Leicester. On 1 June 2020, First Midlands merged with First South Yorkshire. During a group restructure in 2022, Worcester moved from Midlands control to First West & Wales and Midlands & South Yorkshire integrated First Manchester.

== Operating companies ==
=== First Leicester ===
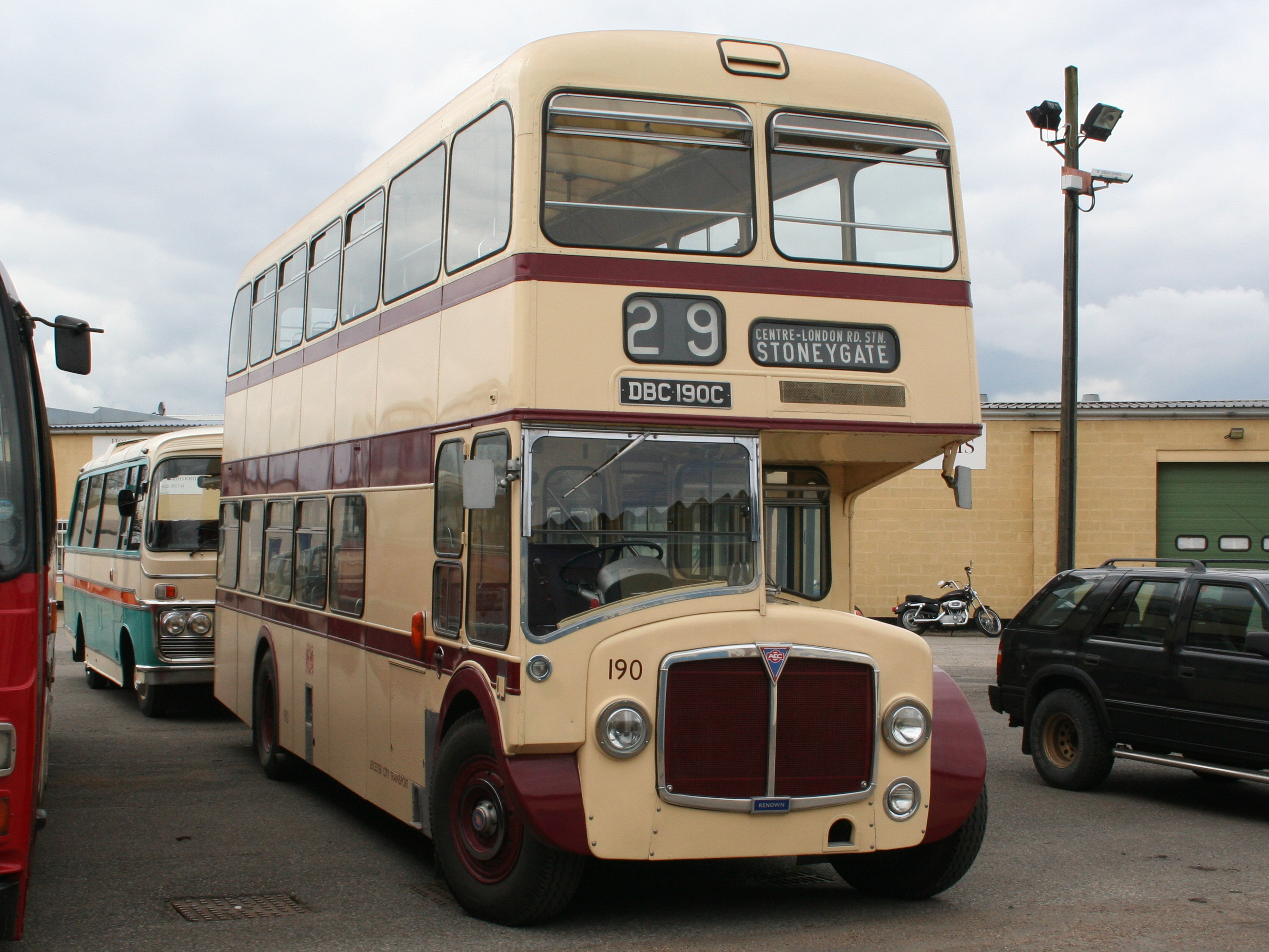
DBC 190C A preserved 1964 Leicester City Transport AEC Renown bus

First Leicester is the descendant of the former municipal bus operations of Leicester City Council, Leicester City Transport (itself descended from Leicester Corporation Tramways. Under bus deregulation in 1986, the council operation was incorporated as the council owned but arms length private company, Leicester Citybus Ltd. This was sold in November 1993 to the emerging GRT Group, shortly after Northampton council had sold its operations to the group.

=== First Potteries ===
The company began life as Potteries Motor Traction Limited or PMT. It expanded beyond its Staffordshire base into Merseyside, Cheshire and Greater Manchester and in 1989/90 PMT acquired the Wirral, Chester and Stalybridge operations of Crosville from the Drawlane Group but not the Manchester, Runcorn and Warrington operations of Crosville which were integrated into Drawlane's North Western/associated Bee Line Buzz Company divisions. PMT was later purchased by the Badgerline Group plc before they in turn merged with GRT Holdings plc and formed FirstGroup, this sale including Crosville's operations in Chester and Wirral.

First Potteries now operates mainly urban services in Stoke and surrounding towns.

=== First South Yorkshire ===
In May 2020, First South Yorkshire merged with First Midlands to be run by the current leadership team at First Midlands.

=== First Greater Manchester ===
During July 2022, First Group announced their proposal for changes to their operating structure of UK bus operations, this will see Greater Manchester operations become part of the South Yorkshire and Midlands group.

== Former operations ==
The former operations in Cheshire (Birkenhead and Chester) are (as of April 2011) now part of First Manchester Ltd, which includes First Greater Manchester.

=== First Northampton ===
This bus company was originally a municipal one owned and operated by the town's borough council. In 1993 the council sold the company to the Grampian Regional Transport GRT Group, which became part of FirstGroup in 1995. Operations in Northampton finally ceased on 14 September 2013 after years of heavy losses. The legal entity of First Northampton ceased to trade with the Luton Airport shuttle having passed to First Essex's O licence some months previously.

=== First Worcester ===
First Worcester began life as Midland Red (West) Limited, one of five bus operating companies created when the National Bus Company's massive Midland Red Omnibus Company Limited subsidiary was split in 1981 in preparation for privatisation. It was created in September 1981 with a fleet of 183 vehicles and used the trading name Midland Red West.

In November 1985 the company introduced a fleet of 60 new minibuses to operate its urban network in Worcester as part of a new high-frequency service within the city. Similar but much smaller minibus services were launched for the Kidderminster and Stourport areas a year later. In December 1986 the company was sold by the NBC to Midland Red West Holdings Limited, a management buyout company created by Midland Red (West) Limited's employees. There was also a minor change in the company name, from Midland Red (West) Limited to Midland Red West Limited. The management buyout also took the 40-vehicle fleet of Midland Red Coaches, which was merged with the main operation.

In 1988 Midland Red West Holdings Limited was acquired by Badgerline Holdings Limited (a management buyout company which had purchased Badgerline Limited from the NBC operating rural services around the Bristol area).

In 2008 the registered office of First Midland Red Buses Limited moved from Worcester to that used by First Leicester in Abbey Lane, Leicester. The operation was rebranded as First Worcester following the closure of Hereford depot in 2015.

During July 2022, First Group announced proposals for changes to their operating structure of UK bus operations. This saw the Worcester division move to a newly formed First Cymru and West of England operation.

== Depots ==
First South Yorkshire & Midlands currently operate out of five depots;

- Leicester Abbey Lane,
- Stoke-on-Trent Adderley Green,
- Newcastle-Under-Lyme (an outstation of Adderley Green)
- Sheffield Olive Grove,
- Doncaster Leger Way,
- Rochdale Corporation Road(now under bee network)

=== Former Operations ===
- Crewe depot was closed in November 2010,
- Newcastle-Under-Lyme depot was closed 5 September 2015,
- First Northampton operations around Northampton ceased in September 2013, most services were replaced by Stagecoach Midlands.
- Kidderminster and Redditch operations were sold to Diamond Bus in 2013.
- Hereford depot closed in September 2015.
- Worcester Padmore Street was transferred to newly formed First West of England management division in 2022.
