= First Northampton =

Bus operator in Northampton, England

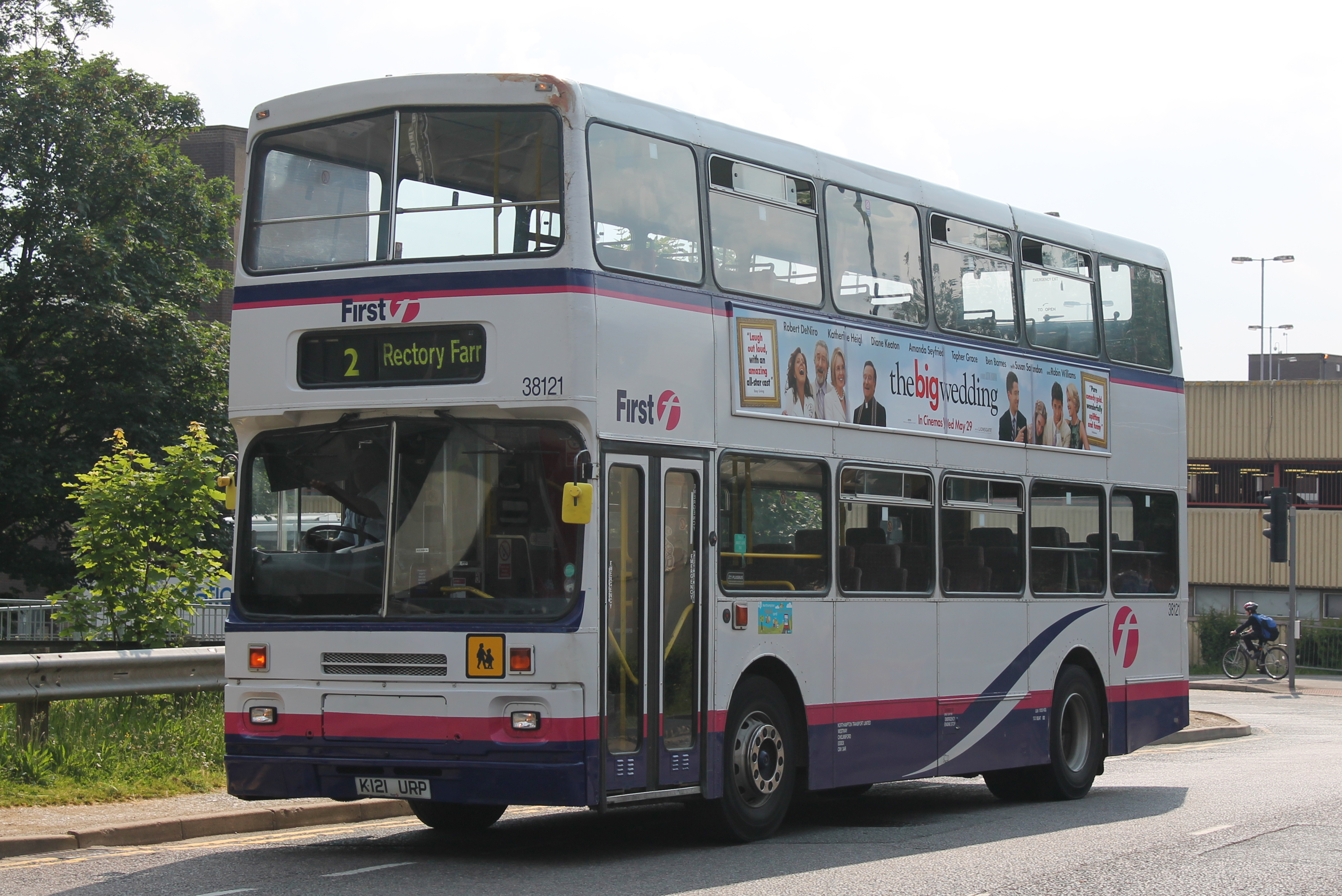
- Alexander RH bodied Volvo Citybus in Northampton in June 2013
- Parent: FirstGroup
- Founded: 1993; 33 years ago
- Defunct: 14 September 2013; 12 years ago
- Headquarters: Northampton
- Service area: Northampton; Kingsthorpe; Rectory Farm; Thorplands
- Service type: Bus services
- Hubs: Greyfriars Bus Station
- Depots: 1
- Fleet: 38 (March 2013)
- Operator: First Midlands
- Website: www.firstgroup.com/ukbus/northampton

First Northampton was a bus company in Northampton. It was a subsidiary of FirstGroup and part of the First Midlands division. It ceased operating on 14 September 2013.

== History ==
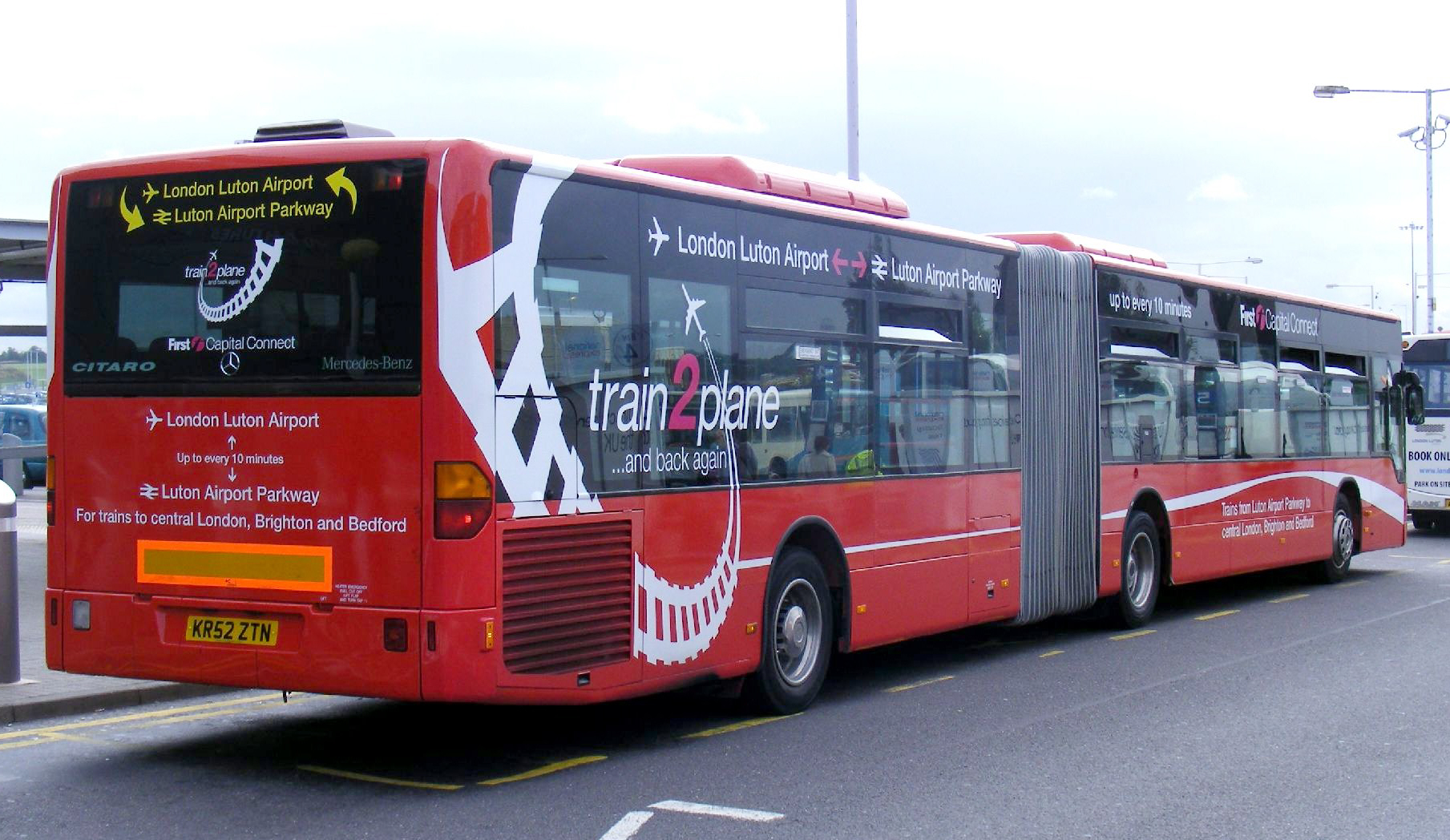
Mercedes-Benz O530G Citaro on the Luton Airport shuttle in August 2009

First Northampton was originally a municipal bus company, Northampton Transport Ltd, owned and operated by Northampton Borough Council. In 1993 the council sold the company to the GRT Group, who in April 1995 became part of FirstGroup.

During July 2013 it was announced via Northamptonshire County Council's website that route 4 would be withdrawn on 11 August. It was also later announced that the remaining services would be withdrawn on 14 September 2013.

== Fleet ==
Following the withdrawal of a number of services during June 2013, some vehicles were transferred to other FirstGroup operations. Following further reductions in services during August 2013 a number of older vehicles including the three remaining Volvo Citybuses followed. At the time of the final services being withdrawn the fleet consisted of nine Wright Axcess-Floline bodied Scania L113CRLs.

As at March 2013 the fleet consisted of 38 buses.

== Services ==
First Northampton operated all of their services from Greyfriars Bus Station.

First Northampton confirmed via their Twitter account on 29 May 2013 that they would be withdrawing services 12, 23, 28, 29 and 30, most of the services were taken over by Stagecoach, Uno and Country Lion.

First Northampton's school contracts concluded in July 2013 and were not renewed.

Service 4 to Obelisk Rise was withdrawn along with the Sunday operations of services 2 & 4A on 11 August. Services 2 was withdrawn on 13 September 2013.

== Depot ==
First Northampton operated out of the former Northampton Transport depot on St James's Road. Following the withdrawal of the final services, the depot remained in operation until 22 October 2013 to service the First Northampton operated Luton Airport Parkway railway station - Luton Airport service, when it was transferred to First Essex's Chelmsford depot.
