= Bus deregulation in Great Britain =

1980s UK government policy

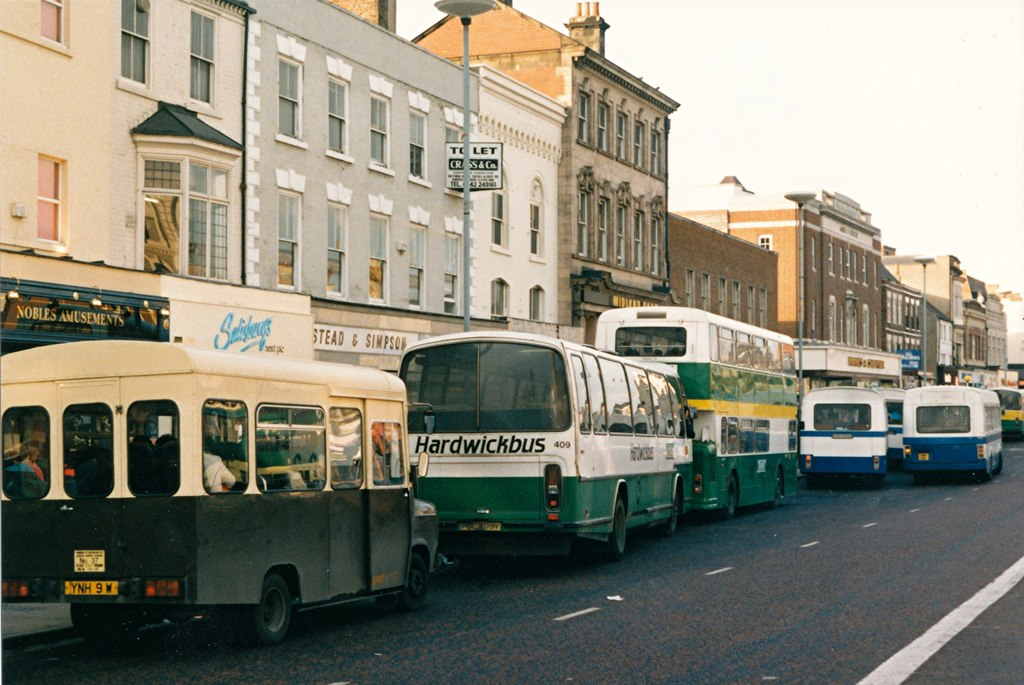
Buses competing for passengers in Stockton-on-Tees in February 1988

Bus deregulation in Great Britain involved the abolition of Road Service Licensing for bus services outside of Greater London. It began in 1980 with long-distance bus services and was extended to local bus services in 1986 under the Transport Act 1985. The abolition of Road Service Licensing removed the public sector's role in fare-setting, routes, and bus frequencies and returned those powers to bus operators.

== Background ==
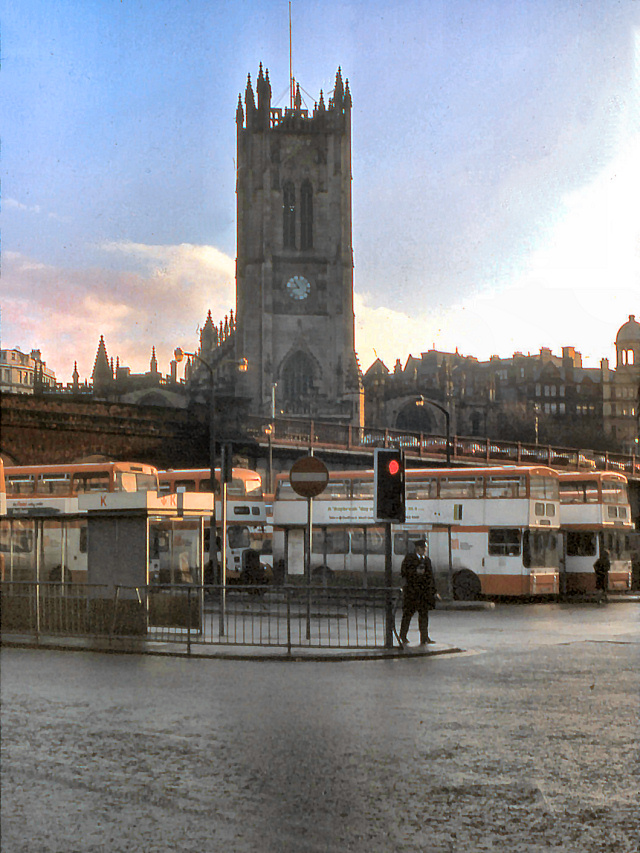
Greater Manchester Transport buses at Victoria Bus Station, Manchester in December 1978

The bus industry in Britain grew significantly after the First World War with many demobilised soldiers starting bus companies with new skills in motor engineering and driving acquired through their military service. Over time, the bus industry then began to consolidate and many were acquired by railway companies. The remaining independent operators, however, were holding the bus industry's profit margins down through running "pirate buses" which only operated during peak demand. Following the lobbying of parliament by the railway and bus industries, the Road Traffic Act 1930 established Traffic Commissioners who had the oversight of safety, as well as commercial regulation: the setting of fares, routes and timetables. Road Service Licensing allowed rival bus operators to object to the registration of new services if it encroached their market share, and to appeal licence applications in traffic courts adjudicated by area Traffic Commissioners.

The postwar Labour government had a policy of nationalising public transport and was in compulsory purchase negotiations with bus companies during the post-war period. Tilling Group entered state ownership in 1948, with Red and White following in 1950. Nationalisation of the bus industry was incomplete when the Conservatives won the 1951 General Election and the process was halted. Labour resumed nationalisation after it increased its majority in the 1966 general election. British Electric Traction pre-emptively sold its bus operations to the government in 1967. In 1969, those bus companies were consolidated in the National Bus Company in England and Wales, and the Scottish Bus Group in Scotland, answerable to the Scottish Secretary. Most bus services were in the hands of the state or run by municipal owned bus operators.

The Thatcher government commissioned a white paper into the bus industry, which resulted in the implementation of the Transport Act 1985 on 26 October 1986 and the deregulation of local bus services in Great Britain. Transport deregulation did not occur in Northern Ireland.

=== London ===
London has had a different regulatory regime from the rest of Britain since the establishment of the London Passenger Transport Board in 1933. At its peak in the 1950s, the London Transport Executive owned a bus fleet of 8,000 buses, the largest in the world.

Ken Livingstone, leader of the Greater London Council in the early 1980s, adopted a policy of open hostility to the Westminster government. The government responded by abolishing the GLC in 1986 and its transport functions were transferred into London Regional Transport, branded as London Transport, which reported to the Secretary of State for Transport and not to any locally elected body. London Transport at the time still had crewed buses long after they were phased out in other cities and the losses incurred by London Transport meant that buyers for bus companies were unlikely to be found.

Although deregulation did not apply to London buses, in April 1989 it was split into 11 quasi-independent companies that were privatised in 1994/95. In London, details of routes, fares, and services levels were still specified by public bodies, with the right to run the services contracted to private companies on a tendered basis.

=== Decline in patronage ===
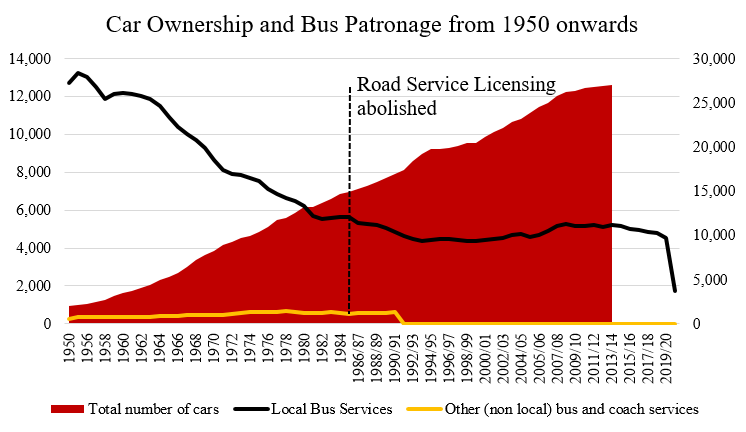
Bus patronage and car ownership in Great Britain 1950–2020. The sharp drop in patronage in 2020 is due to lockdowns during the COVID-19 pandemic.

Bus patronage grew after the war as soldiers were de-mobilised and greater prosperity led to greater use of the bus. However, travel patterns began to change with the steady growth of car sales and other social changes such as the growth of television which reduced evening travel. Most large private bus companies in England included a core industrialised urban area which was profitable, and a rural expanse which either barely covered costs or lost money. These larger bus companies cross-subsidised their rural services with profits from their urban operations. Fares had largely remained unchanged since 1930 partially due to companies growing by acquisition – safe from the threat of new market entrants – but opportunities to improve profitability through consolidation were eventually exhausted.

Increased patronage from the end of the 1930s economic depression and the end of the Second World War provided natural growth in patronage and profitability, but fares began to rise in the 1950s as labour costs increased, passenger receipts declined, and operational efficiency deteriorated due to increasing traffic congestion. Decriminalised parking enforcement would not be introduced until 1991. From the 1950s until the 1990s, traffic engineering practices focused on improving traffic flow and counting vehicles according to the road space they consumed rather than the number of people or amount of goods transported dominated local government policy and the traffic engineering profession. This put the bus at a relative disadvantage in traffic planning compared to personal vehicles. In 1965, a rebate on fuel duty was introduced to assist operators in meeting their costs.

In 1968, the New Bus Grant was introduced, which provided up to 25% of the cost of new one-man-operated buses, rather than crewed buses with a driver and conductor. This made full staffing of bus services easier at a time of labour shortage, and lowered costs significantly in a labour-intensive industry. However, these buses were slower in service than crewed buses and were more vulnerable to "bus bunching" due to drastically increased passenger loading times, particularly where fare stages were not revised and simplified. The loss of crewed buses was largely correlated with urban bus services requiring exact fares with no change being given on the bus. The New Bus Grant was phased out in 1980.

Councils gained powers to subsidise bus services when the Transport Act 1968 came into effect. Councils with their own bus transport department could subsidise their own buses through the rates, but could not subsidise private/nationalised bus services. Prior to this, bus companies negotiated with traffic commissioners on these issues as part of meeting their Road Service Licence obligations. Municipal bus departments were resented by the large bus operators as these operations, being separate, deprived the larger bus companies of profitable market territory to help meet their rural bus services obligations which were part of their Road Service Licence. Much of this cross-subsidy arrangement was destroyed in many parts by the formation of passenger transport executives in 1969 which cleaved the profitable urban operations from the loss-making rural operations, which were folded into the new National Bus Company in 1969.

Conservative governments at that time favoured redistributing bus resources to their often more rural constituencies, whereas Labour's electoral base was more urban and sought to lower fares and introduce additional services in cities. Rising car ownership was seen as valuable for creating jobs in the motorcar industry.

Major bus companies, municipal and PTE bus operations in 1969
1. United Automobile Services; 2. Northern General; 3. Cumberland; 4. Ribble; 5. West Yorkshire; 6. East Yorkshire; 7. West Riding / Yorkshire Woollen; 8. Yorkshire Traction; 9. East Midland / Mansfield; 10. Lincolnshire; 11. Potteries Motor Traction; 12. Trent Motor Traction; 13. Midland Red; 14. Crosville; 15. United Counties; 16. Eastern Counties; 17. South Wales / De Cymru; 18. National Welsh / Cymru Cenedlaethol; 19. Bristol; 20. Oxford South Midland; 21. Eastern National; 22. Alder Valley; 23. London Country / Green Line; 24. Western National / Devon General; 25. Hants & Dorset; 26. Southern Vectis; 27. Provincial; 28. Southdown; 29. Maidstone & District; 30. East Kent; 1. SMT Eastern; 2. SMT Western; 3. SMT Central; 4. W. Alexander & Sons (Midland); 5. W. Alexander & Sons (Fife); 6. W. Alexander & Sons (Northern); 7. Highland Omnibus; 26. Ulsterbus	Map of the major bus companies in the United Kingdom in 1969, overlaid with municipal and PTE bus authorities. Legend to the left

== Effects ==
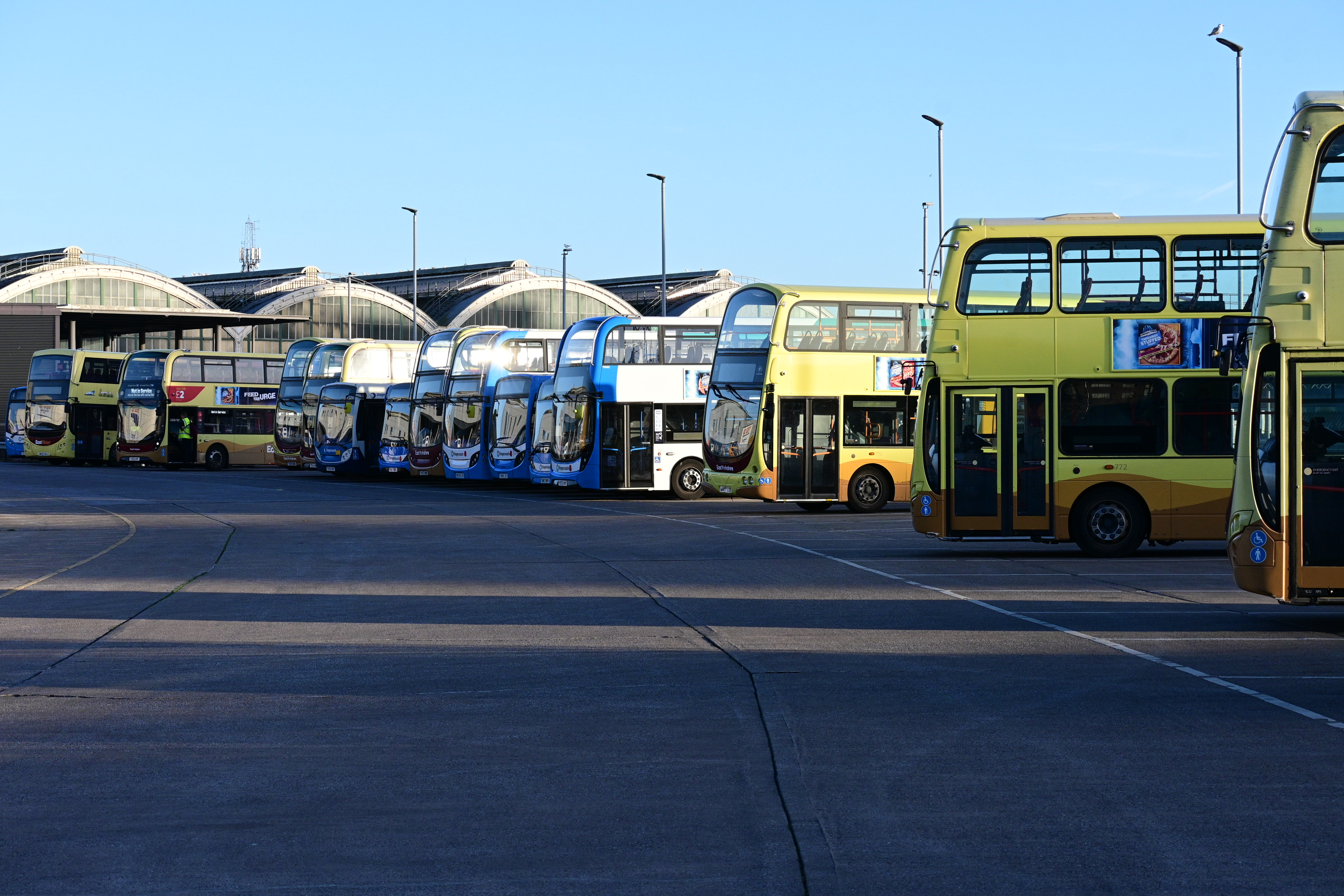
East Yorkshire and Stagecoach in Hull buses at Hull Paragon Interchange in November 2024

The 1985 Act abolished Road Service Licensing for local bus services and allowed for the introduction of on-street competition for local bus services for the first time since the 1920s. To operate a service, all an accredited operator was required to do was to provide 56 days' notice to the Traffic Commissioner of their intention to commence, cease, or alter operation on a route. Traffic Commissioners previously had to consent to fare increases but were stripped of this power. The deregulation of long-distance buses had already occurred in 1980.

Legal changes introduced through the 1985 Act were:

- Bus companies could not object to the registration of services from other operators.
- Revenue support – a general block grant subsidy from local government to an operator to cover losses was abolished.
- Local authorities were given the power to support specific unprofitable services deemed socially necessary; these however had to go out to competitive tender.
- Traffic Commissioners were stripped of their role in fare-setting.
- Municipal bus departments were reconstituted as arm's length companies governed by companies law.
- Low fares policies such as Fares Fair and in South Yorkshire were made illegal as then constituted.

The Act had the effect of transferring financial risk from declining patronage from the public sector to the private sector. Operating costs in the bus sector decreased as restrictive practices were phased out, either on a voluntary basis through agreement with trade unions or through these operators becoming insolvent. Industrial action also decreased significantly as both the employer and the workforce were exposed to the market. Value for money for the public sector became easier to demonstrate as subsidised routes were tendered on a competitive basis, giving the public sector a better understanding of specific costs.

Bus infrastructure, such as bus stations and bus stops, remained with their previous owner. Competition cases meant that privately owned bus stations had to be open and available on a non-discriminatory basis to all operators. Local councils retained ownership and responsibility for bus stops, including maintaining timetable information and bus flags which showed which route numbers called at the stop.

The quality and accuracy of passenger information deteriorated significantly as information on fares moved out of bus stops and was only available through word-of-mouth. Timetables in many cases were poorly published by the operators and complete network maps showing all services, including competitors', were not published at all. Network stability improved over time as networks settled.

=== Patronage ===
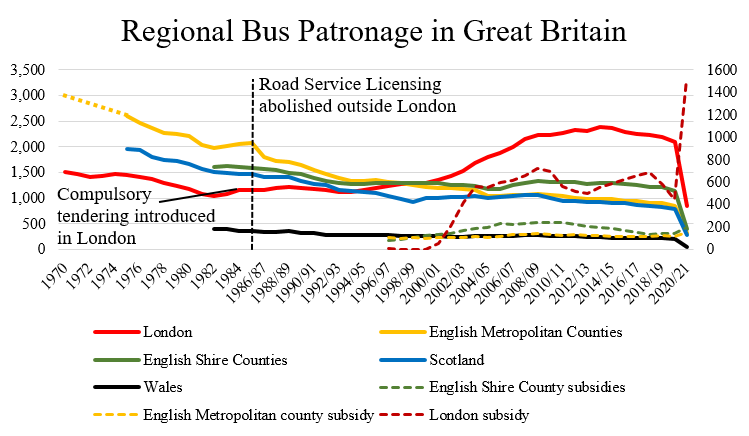
Bus patronage by region

The Conservative government at the time argued that the abolition of restrictive licensing would increase patronage by allowing bus operators to respond more quickly to passengers' needs. While bus networks did change radically, maintenance of market position, or fighting existential threat, was the dominant driver of operators' behaviour immediately after deregulation. Patronage continued to decline across Great Britain, but its impact was uneven; the English "shire counties" saw a continued decline in line with previous trends, as local governments' resources were diverted towards their relatively larger settlements and away from smaller villages as resources were prioritised to serve as many people as possible.

Public transport usage had been declining in metropolitan counties in the years prior to deregulation, except for South Yorkshire (+7%), due to its fares freeze, and in Tyne & Wear (+10%), due to the opening of the Tyne and Wear Metro. The other five PTEs saw declines; West Midlands −11.7%, Merseyside −22%, Strathclyde −39.8%, West Yorkshire −36.4%, Greater Manchester −50.5%.

The most significant decline in patronage was in metropolitan counties as the incumbent former PTE bus operators lost revenue support, had the most extensive networks in their market, and redirected resources to maintain market dominance. Cross-subsidies were drastically reduced, and former PTE bus operators cut early morning, evening, and Sunday services to reduce financial losses and prevent loss of routes. South Yorkshire PTE had had a low fares policy in place, by freezing fares before several years of very high inflation; the average fare in South Yorkshire in 1984 was 5p (equivalent to 16p in 2025); Patronage decreased drastically as full economic fares were reintroduced.

Deregulation and privatisation failed to address the primary cause of decline in patronage, which was surrounded by rising car ownership, such as the abundance of cheap or free parking, car-oriented housing development, and the growth of out-of-town retail centres, which all drove forward the decline in bus patronage.

=== On-street competition ===
Almost immediately existing operators faced competition on their most profitable routes, both from new and existing operators and other municipal operators seeking to increase revenue. This would often result in the incumbent operator retaliating by starting up operations on the new operator's home market. Tactics included cutting fares and operating extra services.

The Act also provided for the privatisation of the National Bus Company which was divided into 70 separate legal entities and sold, with the sale of National Coach Holidays to Shearings in July 1986 being the first. Many were sold in management buyouts, including some 24 which introduced employee share ownership plans. However they quickly began to be bought out by transport companies Arriva, First, Go-Ahead, National Express, and Stagecoach. Intense competition sometimes resulted in a bus war, requiring the intervention of the authorities to stamp out unscrupulous or unsafe practices.

==== Competition cases ====
In 1988, Southern Vectis became the first operator to attract the interest of regulators when the Office of Fair Trading forced it to allow competing operators access to Newport bus station. It was also reprimanded for operating extra services purely to stifle its competition.

In 2000 Stagecoach Manchester was found to have been employing bus inspectors to usher passengers away from competitors' services.

Between March 2000 and July 2002, First Scotland East sought to increase its market share of local bus services in and around Edinburgh. As a result, a bus war sparked between FirstGroup and Lothian Buses, with fares cut, additional vehicles drafted in, routes diverted, and timetables altered. Lothian Buses complained to the Office of Fair Trading, claiming that FirstGroup was engaging in anti-competitive behaviour in an effort to become the dominant operator in Edinburgh. However, it was later ruled by the Office of Fair Trading that FirstGroup's conduct represented "legitimate competition". Despite this, following the ruling, First Bus curtailed their network of services in most of Edinburgh and East Lothian, ending the bus war. Heavy losses were made, which resulted in cutbacks in many parts of their operations.

In 2004/05 Cardiff Bus was found to have engaged in predatory behaviour to stifle competitor 2 Travel.

In 2006/07 Stagecoach Manchester and UK North engaged in a bus war on route 192 and on the Wilmslow Road bus corridor that caused traffic chaos in Manchester. UK North were found to have been engaging in unsafe work practices with two managers jailed.

In November 2009 the Competition Commission found that Stagecoach had adversely affected competition in the area, forcing Preston Bus to let Stagecoach acquire them in January 2009. They were ordered to sell Preston Bus again.

Bus wars still periodically occur. In 2011, indepedenent Connexionsbuses and Transdev Blazefield's Harrogate operation were engaged in such a war in Wetherby. Another example was the 2018–19 bus war between Arriva Southern Counties, Stagecoach South, and Safeguard Coaches in Guildford.

=== Workforce pay and conditions ===
Industrial stoppage decreased sharply after deregulation with the abolition of the protected market. Many inflexible practices which had accumulated and were standard across the bus sector prior to deregulation were removed; differing wage rates for driving different vehicles, which were in some cases allocated on seniority as part of collective bargaining agreements or as part of a side agreement (minibuses were largely introduced as a workaround), demarcation disputes, maintenance of pay differentials, inflexible rostering were phased out as incumbent operators struggled to survive the threat from new market entrants who had no such restrictions. Pay and conditions worsened for drivers across Great Britain, including in London.

=== Ownership ===
When deregulation started, there was an explosion of new entrants to the local bus market – the most notable being Stagecoach, which began as a long-distance coach operator. Many district councils' bus departments were sold or went bust due to the difficulty abandoning old practices such as route cross-subsidy, transporting school pupils without financial compensation from the local authority, and inflexible collective bargaining agreements agreed long before deregulation. Some municipal operations were sold off willingly, others struggled to sell their operations which had been loss-making. The market consolidated through the 1990s as companies grew through acquisition. The largest of which these was achieved by Grampian Regional Transport, a former municipal bus operator which was willingly sold by Grampian Regional Council, which rebranded as FirstGroup.

Only 12 operations remain in public ownership, the largest being Lothian Buses in Edinburgh.

As of 2010, the big five operators – Arriva, First, Go-Ahead, National Express, and Stagecoach – controlled 70% of the market. With the sale of Arriva to Deutsche Bahn and Abellio, ComfortDelGro, Transdev, and Veolia Transport also owning operations, 24% of operators were in foreign ownership in 2010. This has increased with RATP Group and Transit Systems having since entered the market, alongside the sale of the Stagecoach Group to the DWS Group.

Edinburgh's Lothian Buses was not privatised as Lothian Regional Council successfully resisted selling the company off. An 18% share of Nottingham City Transport was sold to Transdev in 2000, but the council has retained 82% of the equity in the company.

=== Criticism ===
Opposers have claimed that since deregulation and privatisation, passenger numbers of UK buses have declined, fare costs have "skyrocketed", and services have become unreliable. Many local authorities have reduced their spending on socially-necessary bus services, lowered their reimbursement rates for concessionary pass holders, neglected bus priority enforcement, provided abundant cheap car parking, and have failed to ensure new housing developments are conducive to bus operation.

== Franchising of bus services ==
Following the Bus Services Act 2017, Greater Manchester became the first city-region to start the process of bus franchising by requesting data from bus operators, with it being confirmed on 24 June 2019 that the franchising of bus services would be the preferred option in the Greater Manchester area. The transition started in Bolton, Salford, and Wigan on 17 September 2023, with subsequent areas being franchised over the course of 2024. The proposed franchising change process in Greater Manchester was subject to legal challenges by both the Rotala Group and the Stagecoach Group, with Rotala taking the case to judicial review. The appeal was rejected in the end.

Intelligent Transport released an article in April 2021, suggesting "that franchising could become a more attractive proposition" as the "transport industry begins to recover from the hugely damaging effects of COVID-19".

In October 2023, the Liverpool City Region Combined Authority announced that it would use the Act's powers to bring buses under public control. Regulated services are expected to start operating from 2026.

The West Yorkshire Combined Authority has also expressed support for the franchising of bus services, but with an expectation that it may not be completed until 2027.

== See also ==
- Deregulation and privatisation of the PTE bus operations
- Privatisation of London bus services
- Transit privatization
