= Municipal bus company =

Bus operator owned by a local authority

A municipal bus company is an operator of bus services owned by a local authority.

== In the United Kingdom ==
This article lists all current municipal bus companies in the United Kingdom.

Most municipal bus companies disappeared between 1968 and 1974 before (or with) the formation of PTE bus operations.

Of the remaining municipal operators, post-1986 many were sold off or collapsed in the process of bus deregulation, which required their separation into stand-alone arms-length companies. A few remaining companies have accepted minority-stake holdings in their companies by private bus operating companies, as a method of securing investment.

List of operating municipal bus companies
Local authorities	Company	Routes	Number of vehicles	Private shareholdings
Aberdeenshire Council	Aberdeenshire Council Buses	Operates local bus route 212 (Tarland to Torphins)		None
Beaminster Town Council	Beaminster Town Council Buses	Operates local bus route CB3 (Bridport to Crewkerne)		None
Blackpool Borough Council	Blackpool Transport	Operates many local bus routes around Blackpool and nearby areas	158 buses and 75 trams (September 2013)	None
Caerphilly County Borough Council	Connect2	Operates local bus routes 5A, 13, C1, H1, J, L, around Caerphilly and nearby suburbs		None
Cardiff City Council	Cardiff Bus	Operates many local bus routes around Cardiff and nearby areas	240	None
City of Edinburgh Council (91%), East Lothian Council (3%), Midlothian Council (3%), West Lothian Council (3%)	Lothian Buses	Operates many local bus routes around the city of Edinburgh and nearby suburbs	721 buses and 27 trams (December 2012)	None
City of Edinburgh Council (91%), East Lothian Council (3%), Midlothian Council (3%), West Lothian Council (3%)	Lothian Country Buses	Operates many local bus routes between Edinburgh and nearby towns to the West of the city		None
City of Edinburgh Council (91%), East Lothian Council (3%), Midlothian Council (3%), West Lothian Council (3%)	East Coast Buses	Operates many local bus routes between Edinburgh and nearby towns to the East of the city		None
City of Edinburgh Council (91%), East Lothian Council (3%), Midlothian Council (3%), West Lothian Council (3%)	Edinburgh Bus Tours	Operates various open top sightseeing tour bus routes in Edinburgh aimed at tourists		None
City of Edinburgh Council (91%), East Lothian Council (3%), Midlothian Council (3%), West Lothian Council (3%)	Eve Coaches	Operates coaches for private hire and contracts		None
City of Edinburgh Council (91%), East Lothian Council (3%), Midlothian Council (3%), West Lothian Council (3%)	Lothian Motorcoaches	Operates coaches for private hire and contracts		None
Cogenhoe and Whiston Parish Council	Cogenhoe and Whiston Parish Council Buses	Operates local bus route VH1 (Northampton to Wollaston)		None
Comhairle nan Eilean Siar	Bus Na Comhairle	Operates local bus routes W5 (Stornoway to Point) and W5A (Stornoway to Tolsta) and W7 (Stornoway town service)	7	None
Denbighshire County Council	Denbighshire Council Buses	Operates local bus routes 76H (Llangwyfan to Denbigh) and 192 (Llangollen to Melin y Wig)		None
Dumfries and Galloway Council	DGC Buses	Operates many local bus routes around Dumfries and nearby towns and rural areas	77 (August 2025)	None
Gibraltar Government	Gibraltar Bus Company	Operates most of the local bus routes in the British overseas territory of Gibraltar		None
Highland Council	Highland Council Buses	Operates many local bus routes around Inverness and other parts of the Highland Council area, as well as some school contracts	24 (as of September 2026)	None
Highland Council	D & E Coaches	Operates many local bus routes around Inverness and other parts of the Highland Council area, as well as some school contracts and also coach routes on behalf of the Scottish Citylink network	64 (as of September 2026)	None
Ipswich Borough Council	Ipswich Buses	Operates many local bus routes around the city of Ipswich and nearby suburbs, as well as some routes further out in to the Suffolk and Essex areas	76 (September 2013)	None
Isle of Man Government	Bus Vannin	Operates the entire Isle of Man bus network		None
Midlothian Council	Midlothian Council Buses	Operates local bus route 800 (Pathhead to Penicuik)		None
Moray Council	Moray Council Buses	Operates many local bus routes around Moray in mostly rural areas		None
Newport City Council	Newport Bus	Operates many local bus routes around Newport and nearby areas	90	None
North Lincolnshire Council	North Lincolnshire Council Buses	Operates local bus routes 96 (Barton to Brigg) and 97 (Sandtoft to Garthorpe) and 97A (Sandtoft to Crowle)		None
North Yorkshire Council	North Yorkshire Council Buses	Operates many local bus routes around mostly rural areas of North Yorkshire and some cross border routes in to neighbouring counties		None
Northern Ireland Government	Translink	Operates the entire Northern Ireland bus network		None
Nottingham City Council	Nottingham City Transport	Operates many local bus routes around the city of Nottingham and nearby suburbs and towns	315 (November 2019)	18% owned by Transdev
Nottinghamshire County Council	Notts Bus	Operates many local bus routes around Nottinghamshire in mostly rural areas and smaller towns		None
Oxfordshire County Council	Oxfordshire County Council Buses	Operates many local bus routes around Oxfordshire in mostly rural areas		None
Pembrokeshire County Council	Pembrokeshire County Council Buses	Operates many local bus routes around Pembrokeshire in mostly rural areas		None
Reading Borough Council	Reading Buses	Operates many local bus routes around Reading and nearby suburbs and towns	165 (May 2013)	None
Reading Borough Council	Newbury & District	Operates many local bus routes around Newbury and nearby suburbs and towns		None
Reading Borough Council	Thames Valley Buses	Operates many local bus routes around Slough and nearby suburbs and towns		None
Rutland County Council	Rutland County Council Buses	Operates local bus routes R9 (Oakham to Stamford) and Oakham Hopper (Oakham town service)		None
Scottish Borders Council	Scottish Borders Council Buses	Operates many local bus routes around the Galashiels and Hawick and Peebles areas including town services and services linking rural areas, as well as school contract services		None
Somerset Council	Somerset Council Buses	Operates many local bus routes around mostly rural areas of Somerset and some cross border routes to neighbouring counties		None
Stirling Council	Stirling Council Buses	Operates local bus routes C17, C60, C61, C62, TEX, around rural parts of the Stirling Council area		None
University of Hertfordshire	Uno	Operates many local bus routes around the Hertfordshire and Bedfordshire areas mostly focused on the university campuses, as well as a few TfL contracted routes in the North London area		None
Warrington Borough Council	Warrington's Own Buses	Operates many local bus routes around Warrington and nearby suburbs and towns	102 (March 2017)	None
West Berkshire Council	West Berkshire Council Buses	Operates local bus route 47 (Lambourn to Swindon)		None
Westmorland and Furness Council	Westmorland and Furness Council Buses	Operates local bus routes 561 (Kendal to Appleby) and S1 (Kendal to Sedbergh)		None

== See also ==
- Bus Eireann a municipal bus operator in the Republic of Ireland
- Bus Vannin a municipal bus operator fully owned by the Isle of Man Government
- Dublin Bus a municipal bus operator in the Republic of Ireland
- East Thames Buses established and owned by Transport for London after deregulation
- Former municipal bus companies of the United Kingdom
- History of the PTE bus operations
- List of bus operating companies
- List of bus companies of the United Kingdom
- London Buses a municipal body owned by Transport for London that regulates bus services operated by private companies
- Uno Bus a bus company fully owned by the University of Hertfordshire
- Wightbus established and owned by the Isle of Wight Council after deregulation
