= Leeland =

Leeland may refer to:

== Places ==
- Leeland, Virginia
- Leeland, Maryland
- Leeland, Nevada

== Other uses ==
- Leeland (band), an American Christian rock band
- Leeland (given name), includes a list of people with the name

== See also ==
- Leeland station (disambiguation)
- Leland (disambiguation)
- Leyland (disambiguation)
- Leelan, village in Faisalabad, Punjab, Pakistan
- Leelanau (disambiguation)
