= Lelan =

Lelan is a given name and surname. Notable people with the name include:

- Josh Lelan (born 1994), English-born Kenyan football player
- Lelan Rogers (1928–2002), American record producer and record company executive
- Lelan Sillin, Jr. (1918–1997), nuclear power pioneer

== See also ==
- Leeland, given name
- Leland § People
