= Leelanau =

Leelanau may refer to a number of articles relating to the region of the northwestern Lower Peninsula of Michigan:

== Geography ==
=== Settlements ===
- Leelanau County, Michigan
- Leelanau Township, Michigan
- Lake Leelanau, Michigan

=== Landforms ===
- Lake Leelanau
- Leelanau Peninsula
  - Leelanau Peninsula AVA
- Leelanau River (archaic name of the Leland River)

== Sites ==
- Lake Leelanau Narrows Bridge
- Leelanau Historical Society and Museum
- Leelanau State Park
- Leelanau Transit Company Suttons Bay Depot
- National Register of Historic Places listings in Leelanau County, Michigan

== Education ==
- The Leelanau School

== Transportation ==
- Leelanau Scenic Heritage Route
- Leelanau Trail
- Leelanau Transit Company
- Tour de Leelanau

== Music ==
- Leelanau, an album by Dana Falconberry

== See also ==
- Leland (disambiguation)
- Leeland (disambiguation)
