= Leyland =

Leyland may refer to:

== Places ==
- Leyland, Lancashire, an English town
  - Leyland Hundred, an hundred of Lancashire, England
- Leyland, Alberta, a community in Canada

== Companies ==
- Leyland Line, a shipping company

=== Automotive manufacturers ===
- Leyland Motors, a defunct vehicle manufacturer based in Leyland, Lancashire
- Ashok Leyland, an Indian company
- British Leyland, a defunct vehicle manufacturer
- Leyland Bus, a defunct bus manufacturer
- List of Leyland buses
- Leyland DAF, a defunct commercial vehicle manufacturer
- Leyland Trucks, a medium and heavy duty truck manufacturer based in Leyland
- Leyland Eight, a luxury car
- Leyland P76, a car

== People ==
- Carl Sonny Leyland (born 1965), English pianist
- Frederick Richards Leyland (1832–1892), English shipowner
- Jim Leyland (born 1944), American baseball manager
- Joseph Bentley Leyland (1811–1851), English sculptor
- Kellie-Ann Leyland (born 1986), British footballer
- Mal Leyland (born 1945), Australian explorer and film-maker
- Maurice Leyland (1900–1967), English cricketer
- Mike Leyland (1941–2009), Australian explorer and film-maker
- Paul Leyland, British mathematician
- Paul Leyland (rugby league) (born 1986), English rugby league player
- Winston Leyland (born 1940), British-American author
- James Leyland Kirby (born 1974) English Ambient musician

== Other ==
- Leyland Band, a British band
- Leyland cypress, a tree
- Leyland number, any of a set of numbers named after Paul Leyland

== See also ==
- Layland (disambiguation)
- Leeland (disambiguation)
- Leland (disambiguation)
- Leyland Titan (disambiguation)
