= Layland =

Layland may refer to:

- Fallow, untilled ground
- Layland, Ohio, unincorporated community in Ohio, United States
- Layland, West Virginia, unincorporated community in West Virginia, United States
- Francis Layland-Barratt, British Liberal Party politician

== See also ==
- Layland-Barratt baronets, a title in the Baronetage of the United Kingdom
- Layland v Ontario (Minister of Consumer and Commercial Relations)
- Layla (disambiguation)
- Leyland (disambiguation)
