= Leyland Olympian =

2 and 3-axle step-entrance double-decker bus chassis

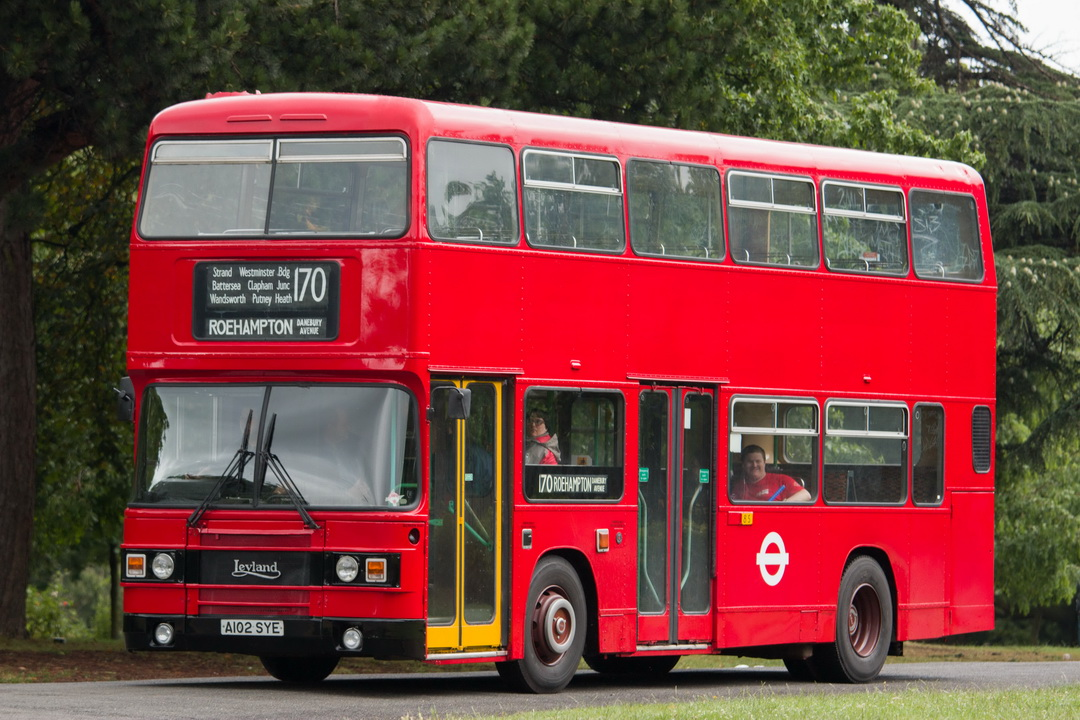
- Preserved London Transport Eastern Coach Works-bodied Leyland Olympian in July 2014

Overview
- Manufacturer: Leyland
- Production: 1980–1993
- Assembly: Brislington; Farington; Workington

Body and chassis
- Doors: 1, 2 or 3
- Floor type: Step entrance

Powertrain
- Engine: Leyland TL11; Gardner 6LXB; Gardner 6LXCT; Gardner 5LXCT; Cummins L10
- Transmission: Leyland Hydracyclic; Voith DIWA; ZF Ecomat; Maxwell

Dimensions
- Length: 2-axle 9.56 m (31 ft 4 in); 10.25 m (33 ft 8 in); 11 m (36 ft 1 in) 3-axle 10.4 m (34 ft 1 in); 11 m (36 ft 1 in); 11.8 m (38 ft 9 in); 12 m (39 ft 4 in)
- Width: 2.5 m (8 ft 2 in)
- Height: 4.2 m (13 ft 9 in); 4.4 m (14 ft 5 in)

Chronology
- Predecessor: Bristol VRT; Leyland Fleetline; Leyland Atlantean; Leyland Titan (B15)
- Successor: Volvo Olympian

The Leyland Olympian is a 2-axle and 3-axle double-decker bus chassis that was manufactured by Leyland between 1980 and 1993. It was the last Leyland bus model in production.

== Design ==
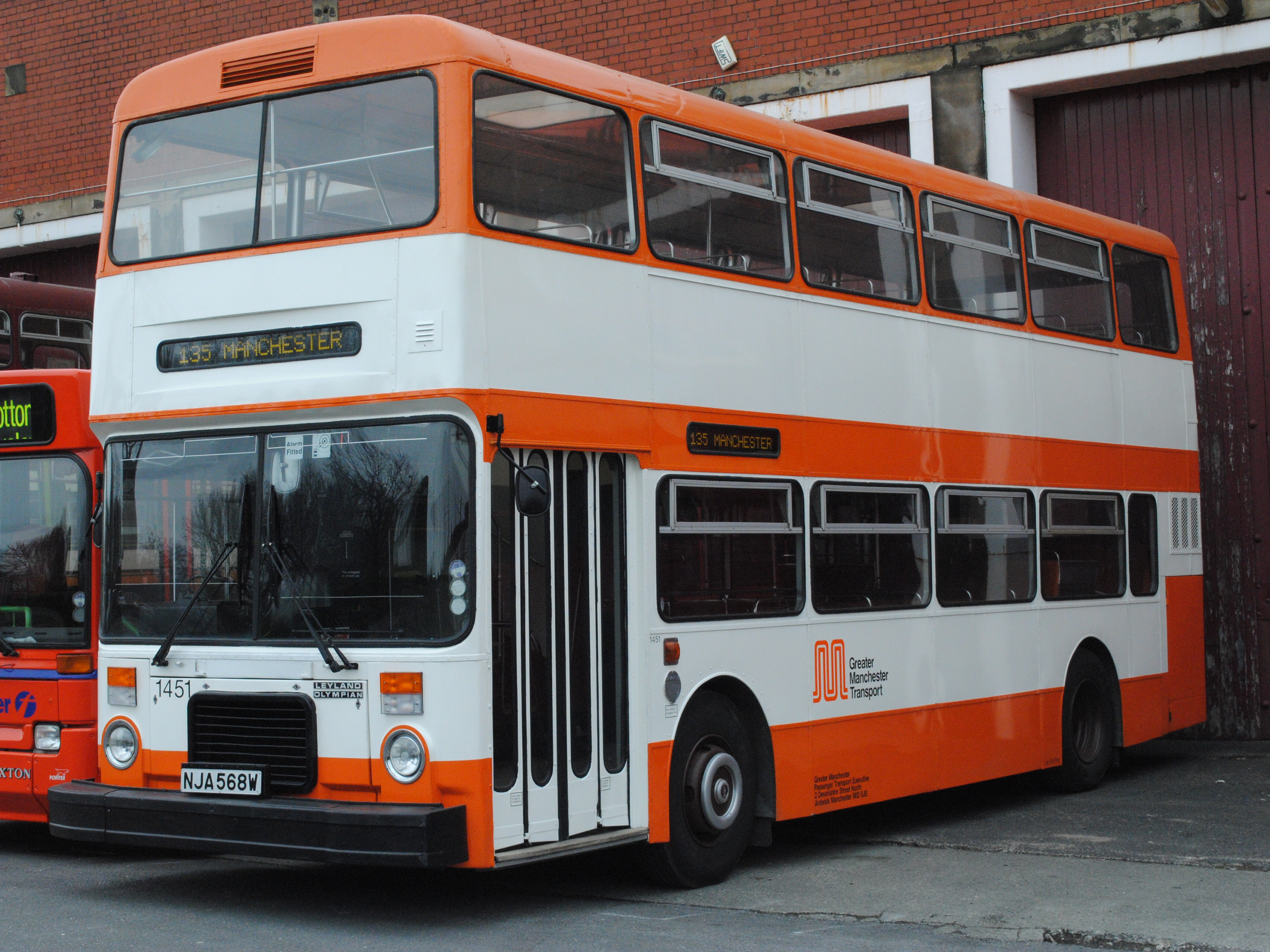
Preserved Greater Manchester Transport prototype Leyland Olympian with Northern Counties bodywork at the Museum of Transport, Greater Manchester in March 2013

The Olympian had the same chassis and running gear as the Leyland Titan integral double deck bus which was ordered in large numbers by London Transport. At the time there was a demand for non-integral vehicles, because operators wished to have the chassis bodied by other manufacturers. Thus Leyland created the B45 project, which was named Olympian, in 1979. This was in many ways an update of the popular Bristol VRT (Bristol Commercial Vehicles merged with Leyland in 1965), with many VR customers choosing Olympians. Later the Olympian also replaced the Leyland Atlantean.

The Olympian was unveiled at the 1980 Commercial Motor Show. It was available in two lengths, 9.56m and 10.25m. The engine was either the Leyland TL11 unit (a development of the Leyland O.680: both were of 11.1 litre capacity) or the Gardner 6LXB or 6LXCT. Some later Olympians had Cummins L10 engines. One Olympian had a 5LXCT.

For the export market a three-axle version was built with lengths of 10.4m, 11.32m and 11.95m. This was very popular with operators such as Kowloon Motor Bus. In 1988, Leyland developed an air-conditioned version of the Olympian, with the refrigerant compressor driven by the main engine instead of a separate engine.

== Production ==
Between 1979 and 1981, nine demonstrators were built, before the first production Olympian entered service with Ribble Motor Services in August 1981.

The Olympian was initially manufactured at the former Bristol factory in Brislington with the first thousand completed here. In 1983, production transferred to Leyland's Farington and Workington plants.

=== Bodies ===
The Leyland Olympian was built with a wide variety of body types:

- Walter Alexander
- East Lancs
- ECW
- Leyland
- Marshall
- Northern Counties
- Roe / Optare
Leyland Olympian body styles
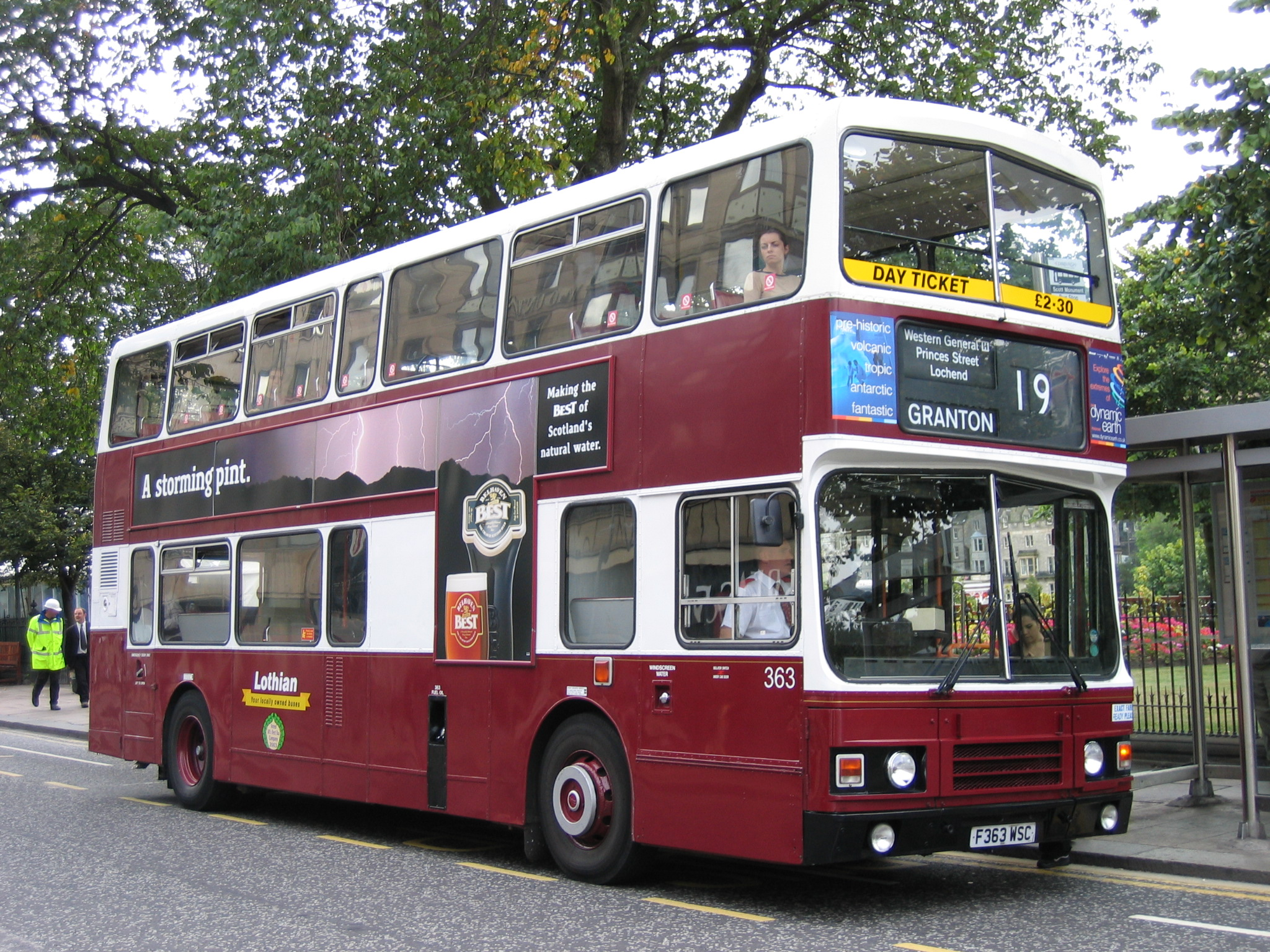
Lothian Buses Alexander bodied Olympian in Edinburgh in September 2005

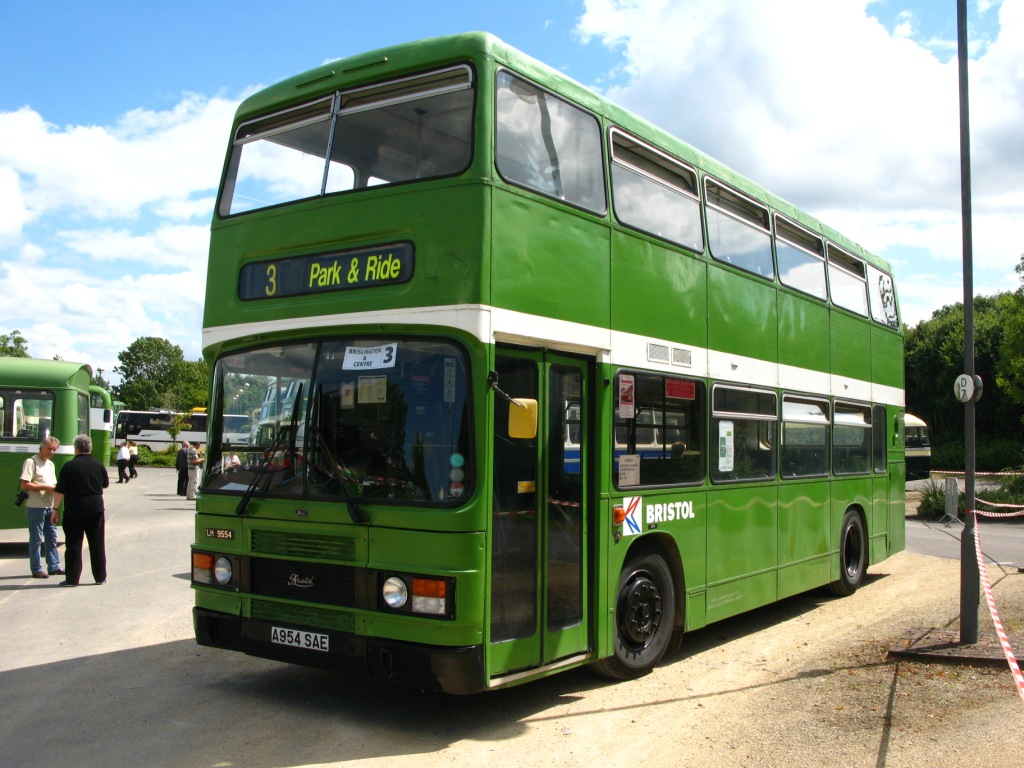
Preserved NBC Bristol Omnibus Company Roe-bodied Leyland Olympian in Brislington, August 2011

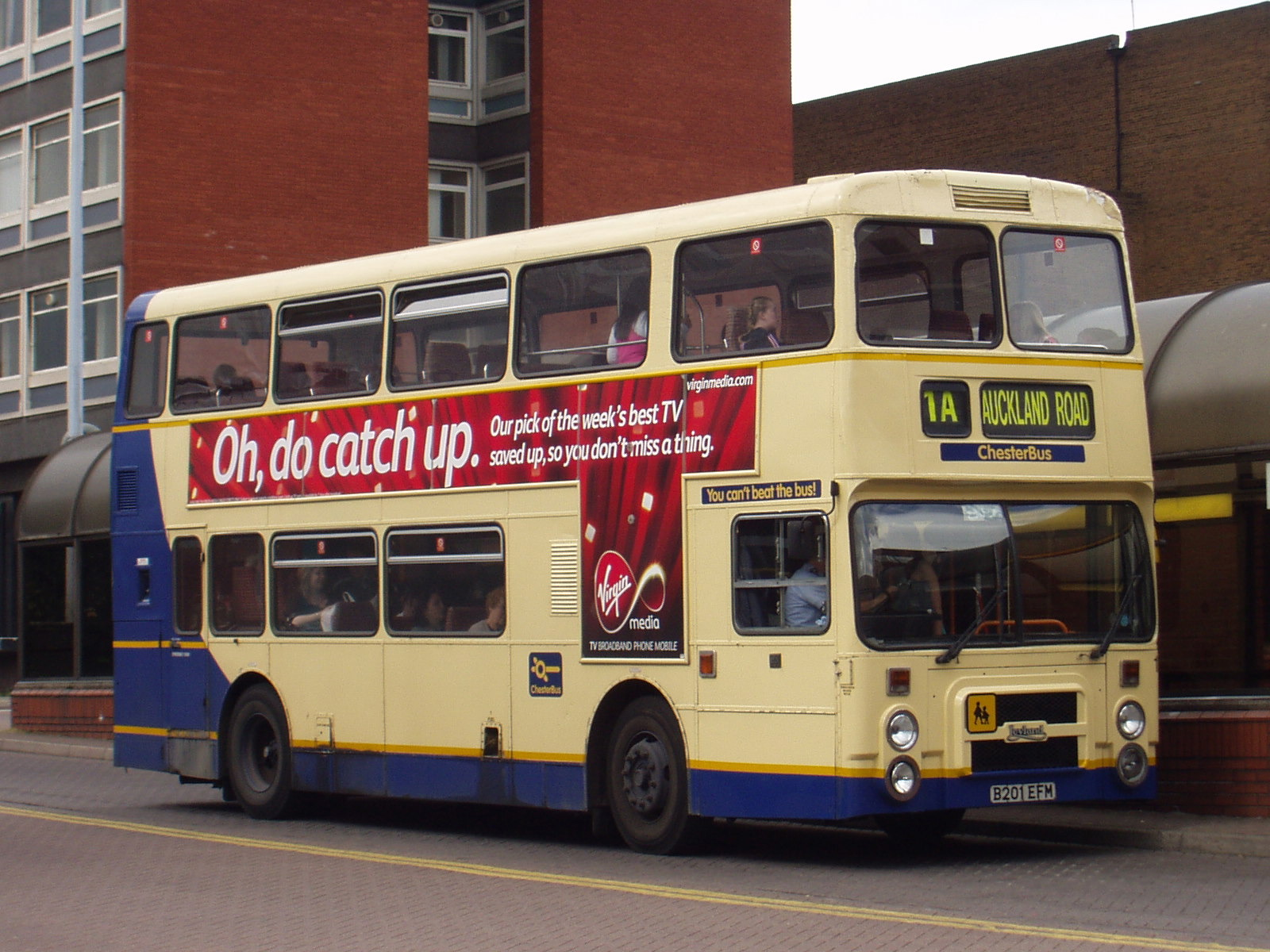
ChesterBus Northern Counties bodied Olympian in Chester in June 2007

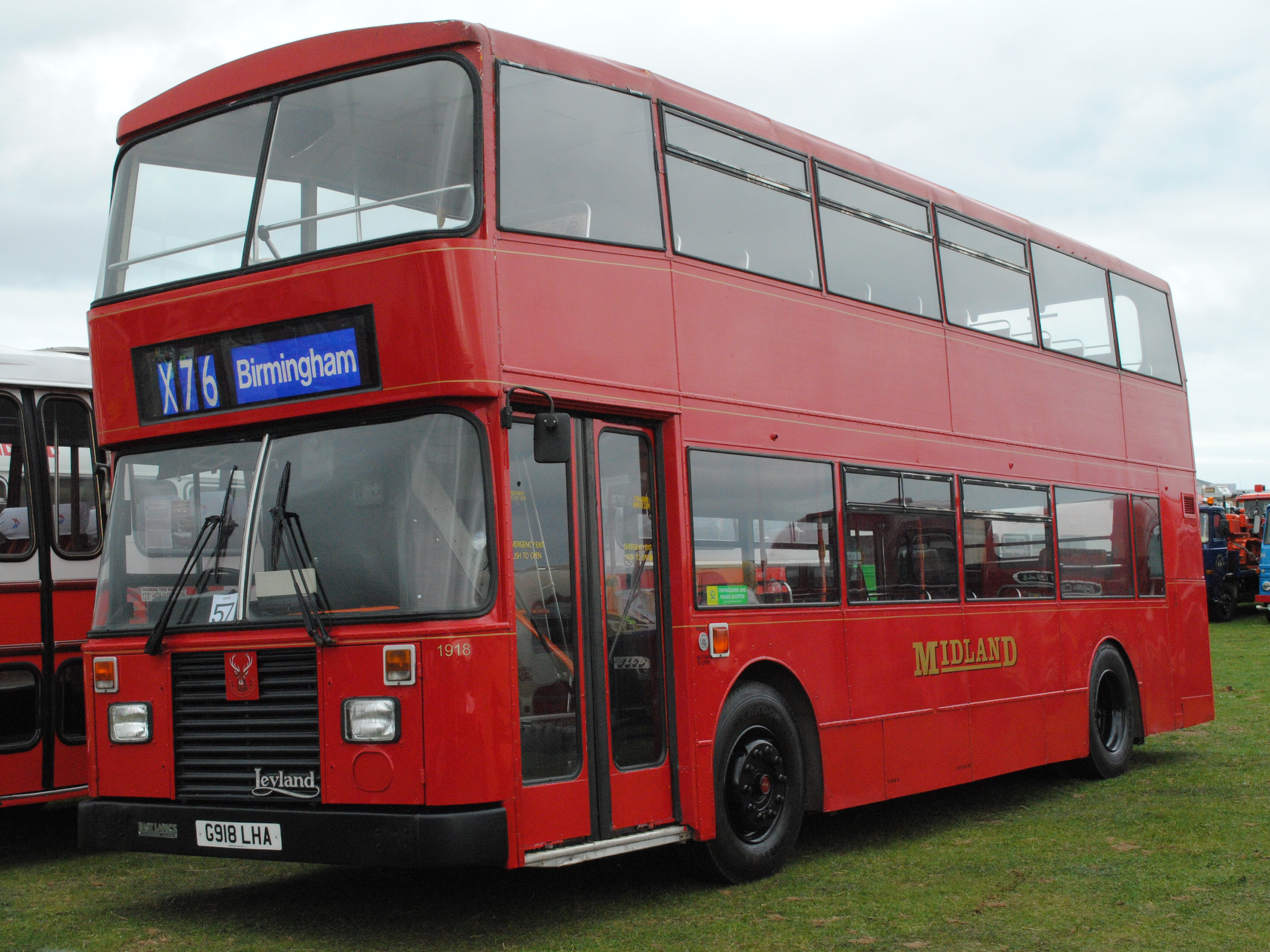
Preserved Midland Red North East Lancs bodied Olympian in Llandudno in May 2013

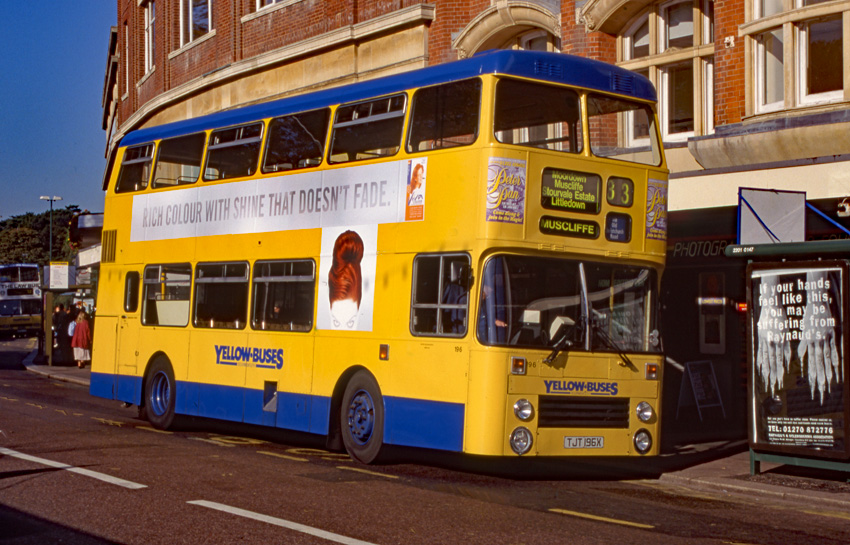
Yellow Buses Marshall bodied Olympian in Bournemouth in October 1997

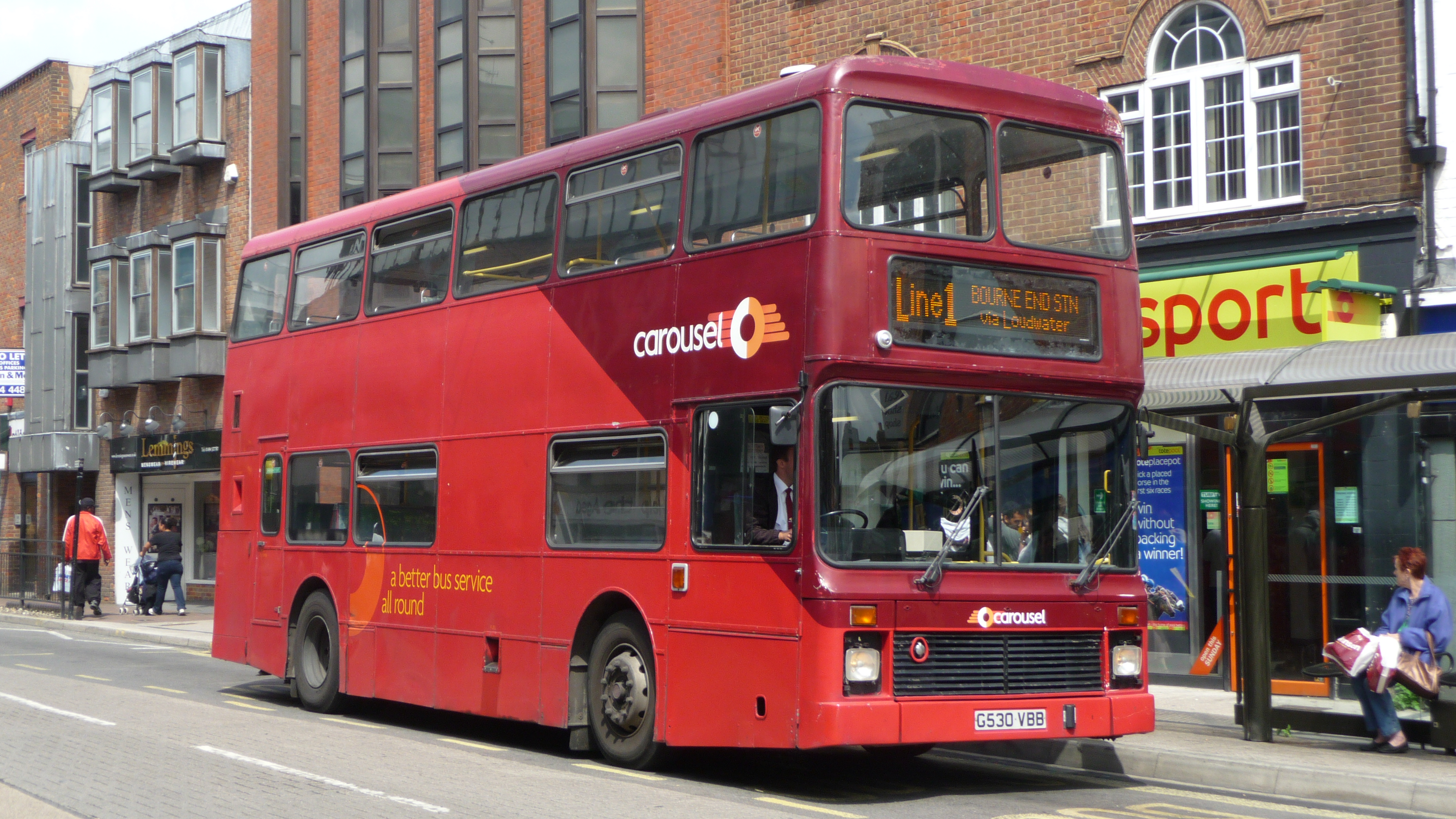
Carousel Buses Northern Counties Palatine bodied Olympian in High Wycombe in July 2009

=== Leyland sale ===
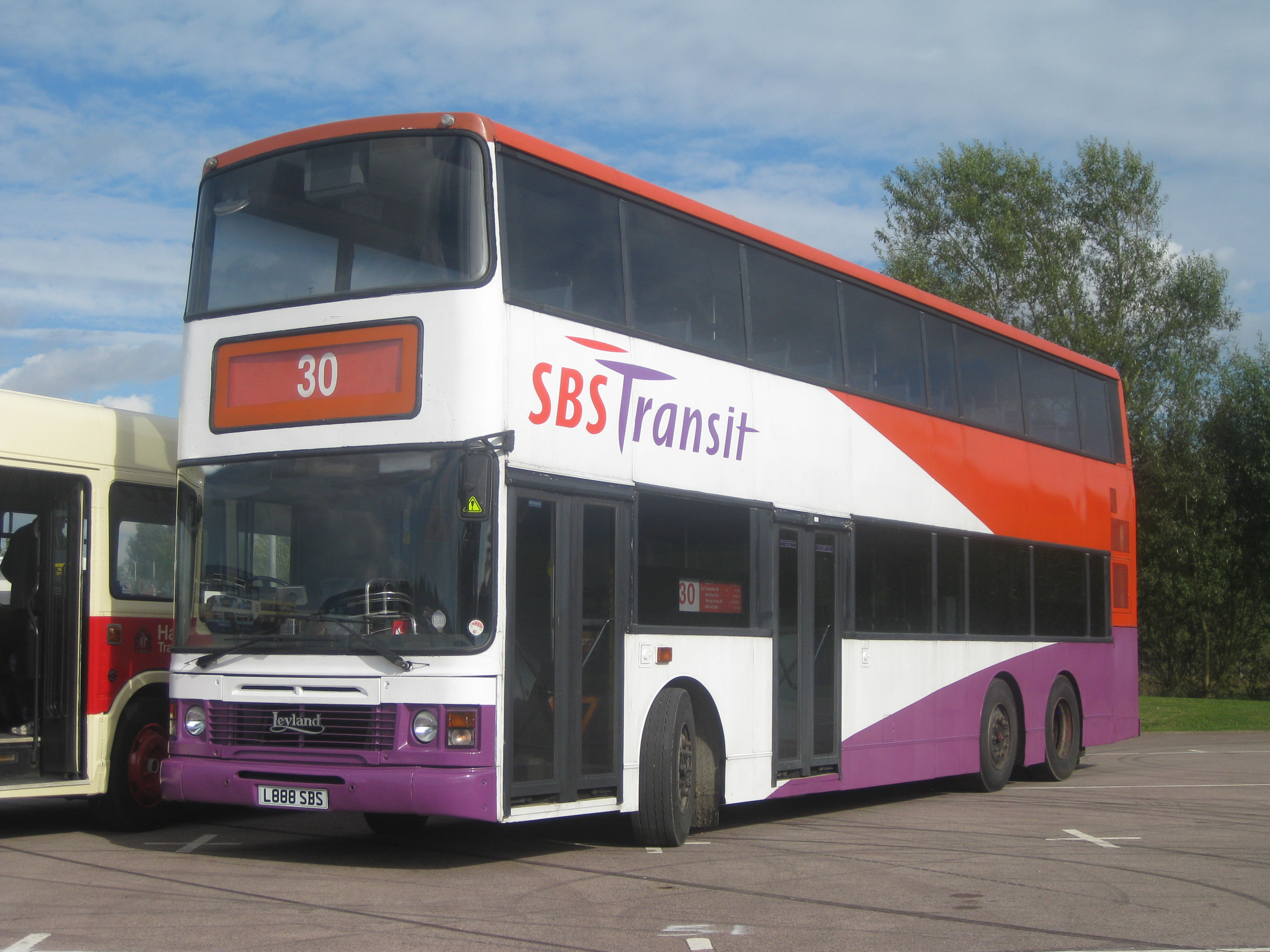
The last Leyland Olympian built, a Singapore Bus Services Alexander bodied tri-axle

In 1988, Leyland was purchased by Volvo, who only continued with the Olympian and Lynx due to the vast number of outstanding orders. More buses also went to Dublin Bus, London Transport, China Motor Bus and Hong Kong Citybus.

The completion of the final orders from a fire-stricken Strathclyde Buses, Dublin Bus, China Motor Bus, Citybus and Singapore Bus Services saw the discontinuation of the Leyland Olympian, with the last delivered to Singapore Bus Services and the plant in Workington closed in 1993.

The Leyland Olympian was superseded by the Volvo Olympian, with the existing chassis retained and a Volvo TD102KF engine replacing the Gardner engine option. The Volvo Olympian remained in production until 2000.

== Operators ==
=== United Kingdom ===
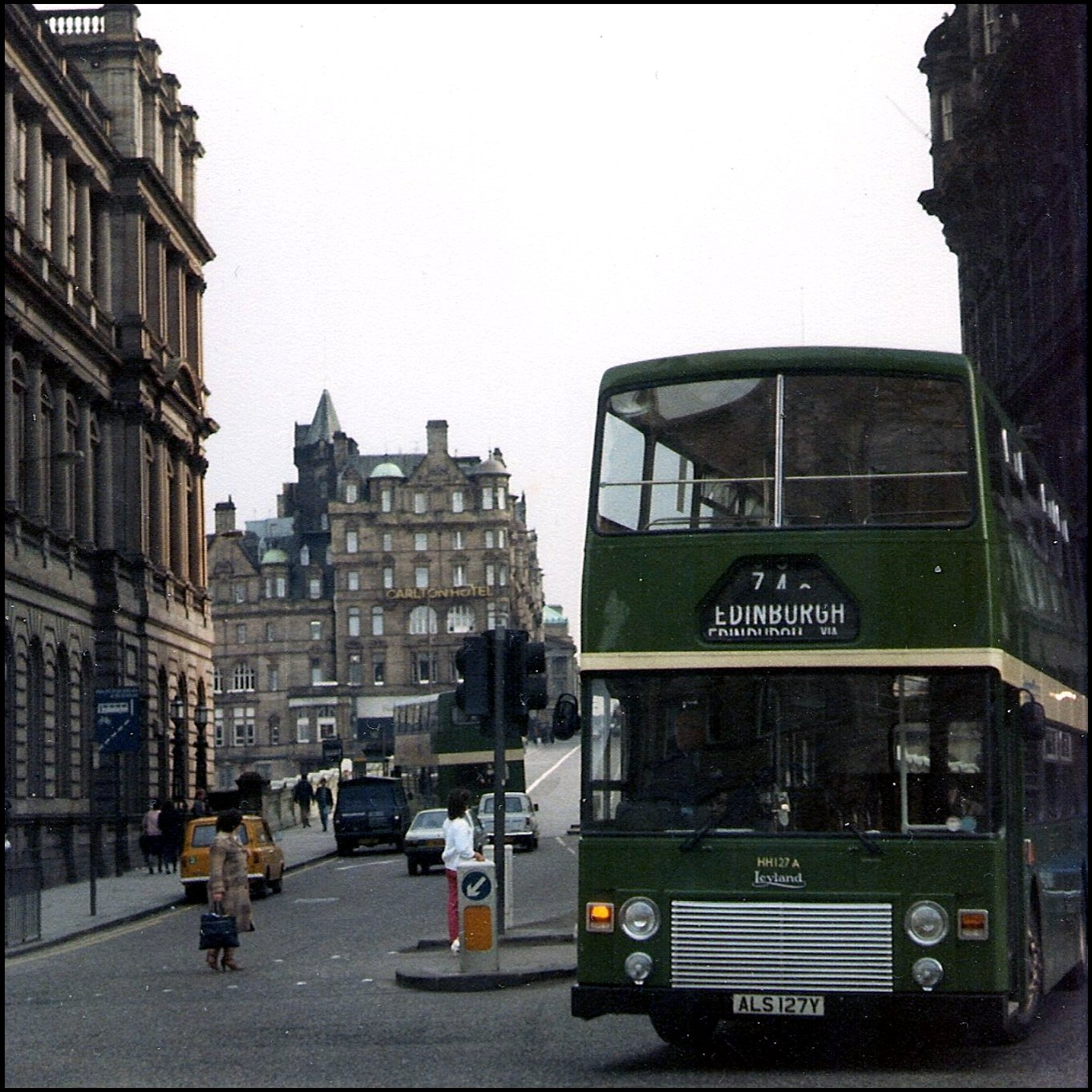
An early example of a low-height Alexander bodied Leyland Olympian, in operation with Eastern Scottish in Edinburgh in 1982.

The Leyland Olympian was highly popular in the United Kingdom, with orders from operators both before and after privatisation. It was purchased in London and by many of the National Bus Company and Scottish Bus Group subsidiaries, municipal bus companies, passenger transport executives (PTEs) and private operators and after deregulation emerging groups within the UK bus industry.

Despite placing major orders for the Leyland Titan and MCW Metrobus in the late 1970s and early 1980s London Regional Transport/London Buses in 1984 took three Leyland Olympians for evaluation. With the Titan discontinued by Leyland in 1984 London Buses purchased 350 Leyland Olympians from 1986 to 1992. The majority of these had ECW bodywork although the latter deliveries had Leyland integral and Alexander R-Type bodies. Some of the Alexander bodied Olympians did remain in London as open top buses in use with The Original Tour. NBC subsidiary London Country purchased 102 Leyland Olympians prior to deregulation with ECW and Charles H. Roe bodies for use on routes in Outer London and the home counties. Leyland Olympians were also purchased by various private operators in the London Buses tendering period in the late 1980s and early 1990s. These commonly had Alexander and Northern Counties bodywork, however some were also built with integral Leyland bodies. London's Olympians along with their Volvo successors were gradually withdrawn in the early 2000s due to the move towards full low-floor operation in the capital by 2005 when the last Olympians were withdrawn and sold or transferred to other operators in the UK.

All of the PTEs - with the exception of the West Midlands Passenger Transport Executive, who purchased the Birmingham-built MCW Metrobus - bought the Olympian in the early/mid 1980s with some PTEs building up large numbers of the type and other PTEs smaller numbers prior to privatisation and deregulation of the bus industry. Greater Manchester Transport was the largest PTE operator of the Leyland Olympian with approximately 280 purchased from 1980 to 1986. Its successor GM Buses also purchased an additional 30 in 1988/89 and all of these had bodywork by Northern Counties. West Yorkshire Passenger Transport Executive (Metrobus) purchased 163 Olympian's all of which had full height Charles H. Roe bodywork. It's deregulated successor Yorkshire Rider also purchased 62 Leyland's. After an initial 5 with Optare bodywork (successor of Charles H. Roe) all of Yorkshire Rider's examples were bodied by Alexander and Northern Counties making a combined total of 225 which were purchased from 1981 to 1990. Greater Glasgow/Strathclyde Transport purchased 46 Olympian's with a mix of Alexander, ECW and Charles H. Roe bodies. Successor Strathclyde's Buses purchased 55 which except for 3 having Leyland integral bodywork all had Alexander R-Type bodies with a total of 101 purchased from 1981 to the end of Leyland designation for the Olympian at the end of 1993. Tyne & Wear Transport purchased 65 in 1985/86 all with Alexander R-Type bodywork although its successor Busways bought only 10 in 1990 all of which had Northern Counties bodies. The other extent were operators like Merseyside Transport who purchased 15 Olympians in an experimental fleet to evaluate various double deck types to replace the Atlantean which Merseyside like many other PTEs had built up in large numbers and continued to purchase right up to the last one produced in mid-1984 when it was discontinued by Leyland. These had ECW and Alexander bodywork although its successor Merseybus did buy a much larger batch of 70 Olympians in 1988/89 that had a mix of Alexander and Northern Counties bodies. The South Yorkshire Passenger Transport Executive only bought 2 Olympians with Charles H. Roe bodywork originally intended for the West Yorkshire PTE and similar to the West Midlands it preferred to go mostly with another bus type the Dennis Dominator in this period.

Lothian Regional Transport were another notable Leyland Olympian customer purchasing over 200 from 1982 right through to the change to Volvo designation - which Lothian would continue to purchase, in 1993. The early Olympians mostly had ECW bodies, however from the late 1980s Lothian began to settle on Alexander's R-Type body which it had initially purchased as the first of its type in 1982. The Leylands were withdrawn by Lothian in 2009 as they along with other operators in the industry gradually shifted to 100% low-floor vehicles in the early 2010s.

The emerging groups in the post deregulation bus industry would also purchase Leyland Olympians albeit in much reduced numbers compared to before deregulation notable orders came from Stagecoach Holdings who mostly specified the Alexander R-Type along with smaller batches with integral Leyland and Northern Counties bodies and to a lesser extent the Drawlane Group who specified Leyland Olympians with East Lancs Coachbuilders bodywork mainly for its Midland Red North subsidiary.

South Wales Transport ordered 7 of these in 1985 registered C901-C907 FCY. These remained in service with First Cymru until 2005.

The last remaining Leyland Olympians in regular revenue-earning service were withdrawn by Rotala-owned Preston Bus in December 2016. Both the Leyland Olympian and its Volvo successor were withdrawn by public service operators ahead of a 1 January 2017 deadline set by the Public Service Vehicles Accessibility Regulations 2000 (PSVAR), which mandated that all public double-decker buses in the United Kingdom had a step-free entrance and at least one wheelchair space available.

=== Exports ===
==== Greece ====
The state-owned Urban Transport Company (Greek: Επιχείρηση Αστικών Συγκοινωνιών, ΕΑΣ) of Athens received 20 Leyland Olympians in 1983, with one being a demonstrator model delivered to the operator for trials in 1982. These were all withdrawn by 1 October 1994; one of them is preserved.

==== Hong Kong ====
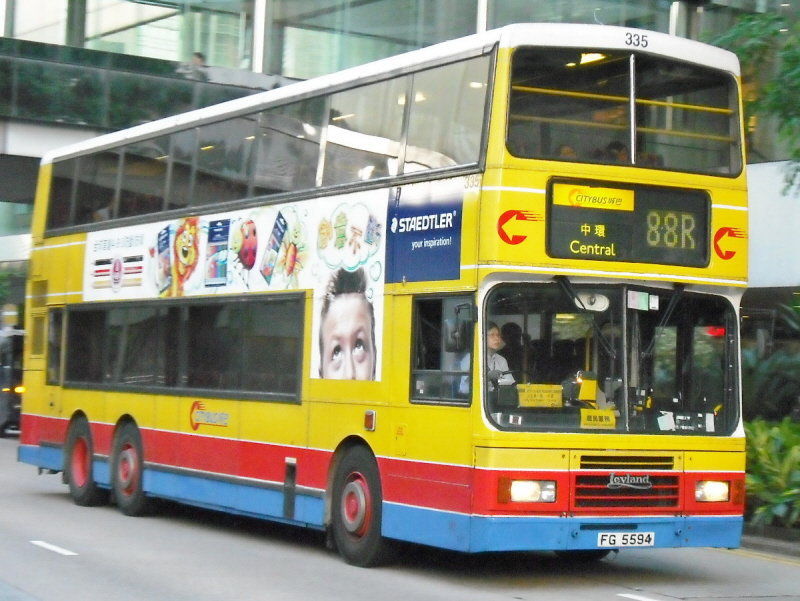
Citybus Alexander bodied Leyland Olympian in Hong Kong in August 2008

Between 1981 and 1993, Kowloon Motor Bus purchased 906 Olympians, with all but four having Alexander bodywork. Some were later repatriated to the United Kingdom, including 22 converted to open top configuration by The Big Bus Company.

China Motor Bus purchased 37 Olympians between 1981 and 1993. All 35 three-axle Olympians passed to New World First Bus, with the entire batch of ten non-air-conditioned buses being sold to FirstGroup who repatriated them to the United Kingdom for use at their East Counties, Glasgow, Manchester and PMT subsidiaries.

Citybus purchased 294 new Leyland Olympians including 2-axle Olympians (#7, #12, #14, #15, #17, #18). In 1990, the Citybus fleet numbering system was changed to remove the prefixes. In the early to mid 1990s, selected 2-axle Leyland Olympians were converted to open-top for use on private hire services, complementing the operator's AEC Routemasters, however these were withdrawn gradually after 2001. #7 was the last 2-axle Leyland Olympian in Hong Kong, where it was retired in 2009 and eventually scrapped. In 2003, 54 were repatriated to the United Kingdom to operate express services for Megabus.

All Hong Kong franchised Olympians had been withdrawn by October 2011. The non-franchised, open-topped, air-conditioned double deckers and private hire buses were withdrawn by 2015 due to their non-compliance with Hong Kong's emission regulations. Citybus #391 was the last Leyland Olympian to ever run in Hong Kong.

==== Ireland ====
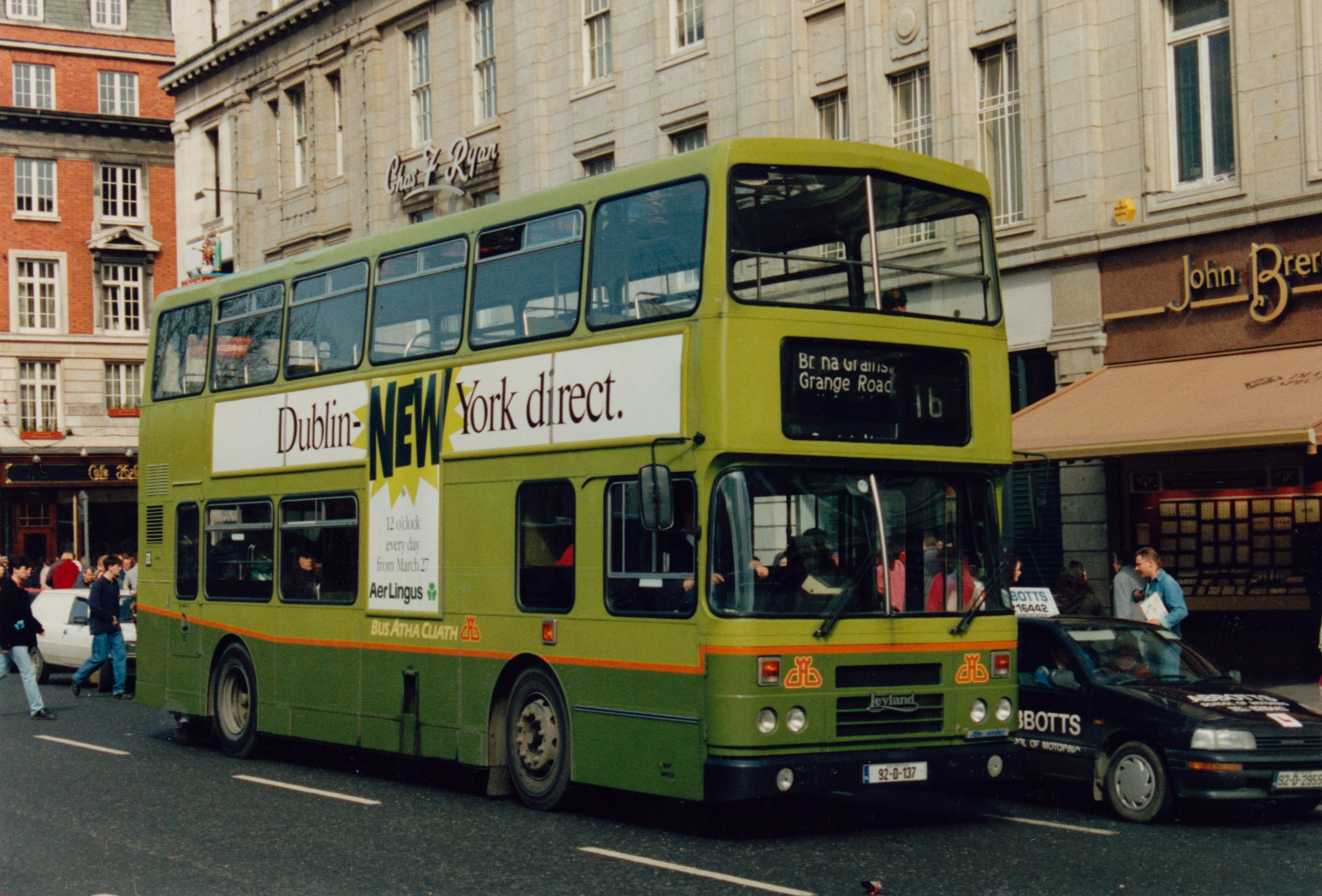
Dublin Bus Alexander (Belfast) bodied Leyland Olympian on O'Connell Street in March 1994

Dublin Bus purchased a total of 175 Alexander (Belfast)-bodied Leyland Olympians from 1990 until the end of Leyland production in 1993, these being the first double-deckers to be built at Walter Alexander's Belfast plant since 1975. The Leyland Olympians were classed as the 'RH' type in Dublin Bus fleet. Dublin Bus started to phase out Leyland Olympians beginning in December 2003 and completed in December 2006, they were not repainted into yellow/blue livery.

==== North America ====
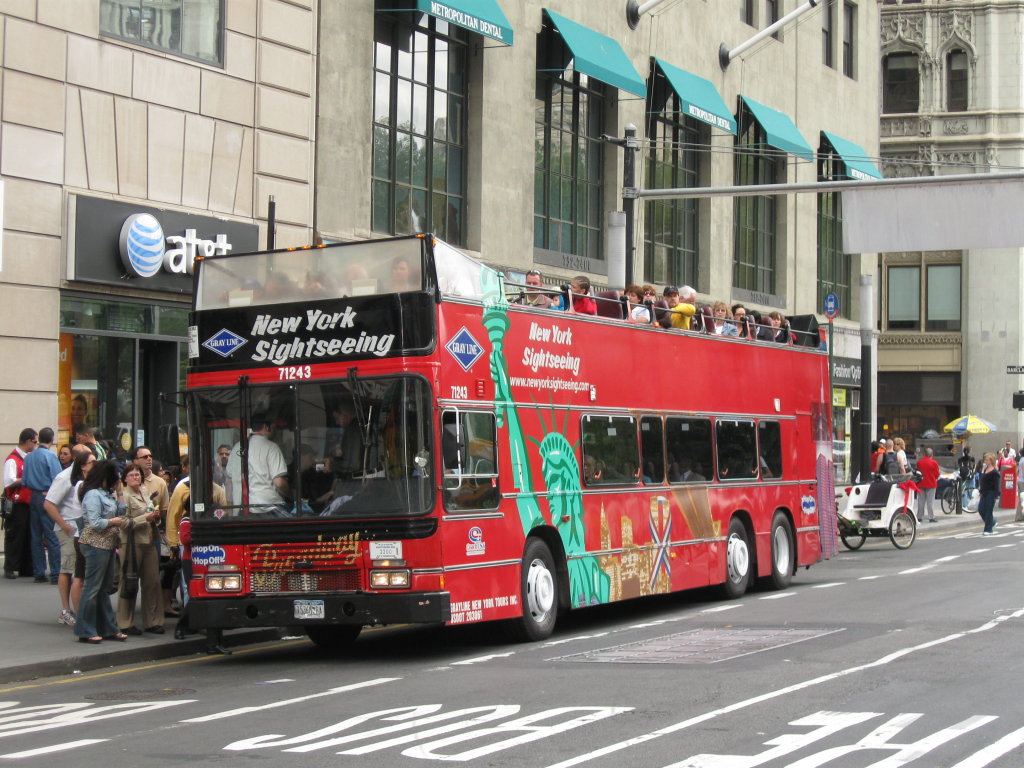
Gray Line Olympian in New York City in May 2008

In 1984, an Eastern Coach Works bodied left hand drive Olympian was sent to the United States as a demonstrator. It was used as a shuttle bus at Expo 86 in Vancouver, British Columbia, Canada. It then entered service on Gray Line tours in Victoria. It was later sold to Brampton Transit.

Grosvenor Coach Lines (Gray Line) of San Francisco received 10 Eastern Coach Works bodied three-axle Leyland Olympians in 1986 for sightseeing purposes. Seven were later transferred to New York City and the other three to Seattle. After a period in store, the three Seattle units were repowered with Detroit Diesel engines in Los Angeles and returned to Gray Line duties in San Francisco in 2015.

==== Singapore ====
Singapore Bus Services (SBS) received a single 2-axle Leyland Olympian B45 for evaluation in 1981 which had been exhibited at the 1980 Commercial Motor Show in the UK and described as a "Far Eastern" prototype. This bus had a 3+2 transverse seating arrangement capable of carrying 98 passengers, unseen in Singapore but common in Hong Kong at the time. It was deployed on route 162 until its withdrawal in late 1982, where it was subsequently repatriated to the UK and rebuilt to enter service with City of Oxford Motor Services. Satisfied with the trial, SBS ordered 200 2-axle Leyland Olympians fitted with Alexander R-Type bodies and Leyland TL11 engines for delivery from 1986, these being SBS' last Leyland-engined buses.

In 1992, SBS ordered 200 tri-axle Leyland Olympians fitted with Alexander Royale bodies and equipped with Cummins LT10-B252 engines and ZF Ecomat 4HP500 transmissions. Delivered during 1993, they were also the last Leyland buses to be built before the closure of Leyland's Workington factory. These were Singapore's first air-conditioned and tri-axle double deck buses, capable of carrying up to 123 passengers, and were nicknamed the "Superbus" owing to their length and high specification. Withdrawal of these buses began in 2010, and the last Olympians were retired in April 2013; SBS 9168S, the last Leyland Olympian built, was repatriated to the United Kingdom in 2013 for preservation by Dave Rogers and re-registered as L888 SBS.
