= Leland Hotel =

Leland Hotel may refer to:

- Leland Hotel (Springfield, Illinois), a historic hotel
- Leland Hotel (Richmond, Indiana), Wayne County, Indiana
- The Leland Hotel (Detroit), Michigan
- Leland Hotel, at the Pike Place Market in Seattle, Washington
