= Leeland (given name) =

Leeland may refer to:

- Leeland McElroy (born 1974), American football player
- Leeland Dayton Mooring (born 1988), American singer-songwriter and musician
- Leeland Pete or Lee Pete (1924–2010), American sports-talk radio broadcaster and college athlete

== See also ==
- Leland § People
- Leyland § People
