= Leyland Titan =

Leyland Titan is a brand name used by British Leyland on two occasions. It could refer to:

- Leyland Titan (front-engined double-decker), built between 1927 and 1970
- Leyland Titan (B15), a rear-engined double-decker built between 1977 and 1984
