= Leeland station =

Leeland station may refer to:

- Leeland, Nevada, a former railway hamlet in Nye County, Nevada, also known as Leeland Station
- Leeland Road station, a commuter rail station located in Stafford, Virginia
- Leeland/Third Ward station, a light rail station in Houston, Texas

== See also ==
- Leeland (disambiguation)
- Leyland railway station
