= Merseybus =

Former major bus operator in Merseyside, England

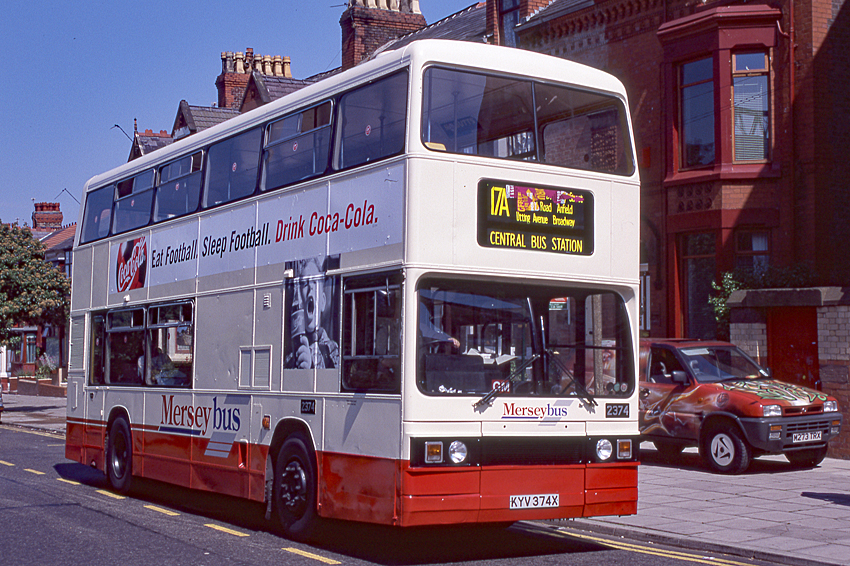
- Merseybus Leyland Titan in MTL Trust Holdings livery in Anfield in June 1996
- Parent: Merseyside Passenger Transport Authority (1986-1993); MTL (1993-2000)
- Founded: October 26, 1986; 39 years ago
- Defunct: February 17, 2000; 26 years ago
- Headquarters: Edge Lane, Liverpool
- Service area: Merseyside; Lancashire; Greater Manchester
- Service type: Bus and coach
- Depots: 5
- Fleet: 1,207 (1985)

Merseybus was a bus operator running bus and coach services predominantly in and around Merseyside, England. Based at Edge Lane, Liverpool, Merseybus was formed as an "arm's length" operation of the Merseyside Passenger Transport Executive (Merseyside PTE) out of its bus operations following bus deregulation in Great Britain and was later sold to Merseybus management and staff in a £5.9 million Employee Share Ownership Plan in 1993, forming the core of MTL's bus operations. Merseybus was subsequently sold alongside all MTL operations to Arriva on 17 February 2000, and operations today trade under Arriva North West.

== History ==
=== Formation ===
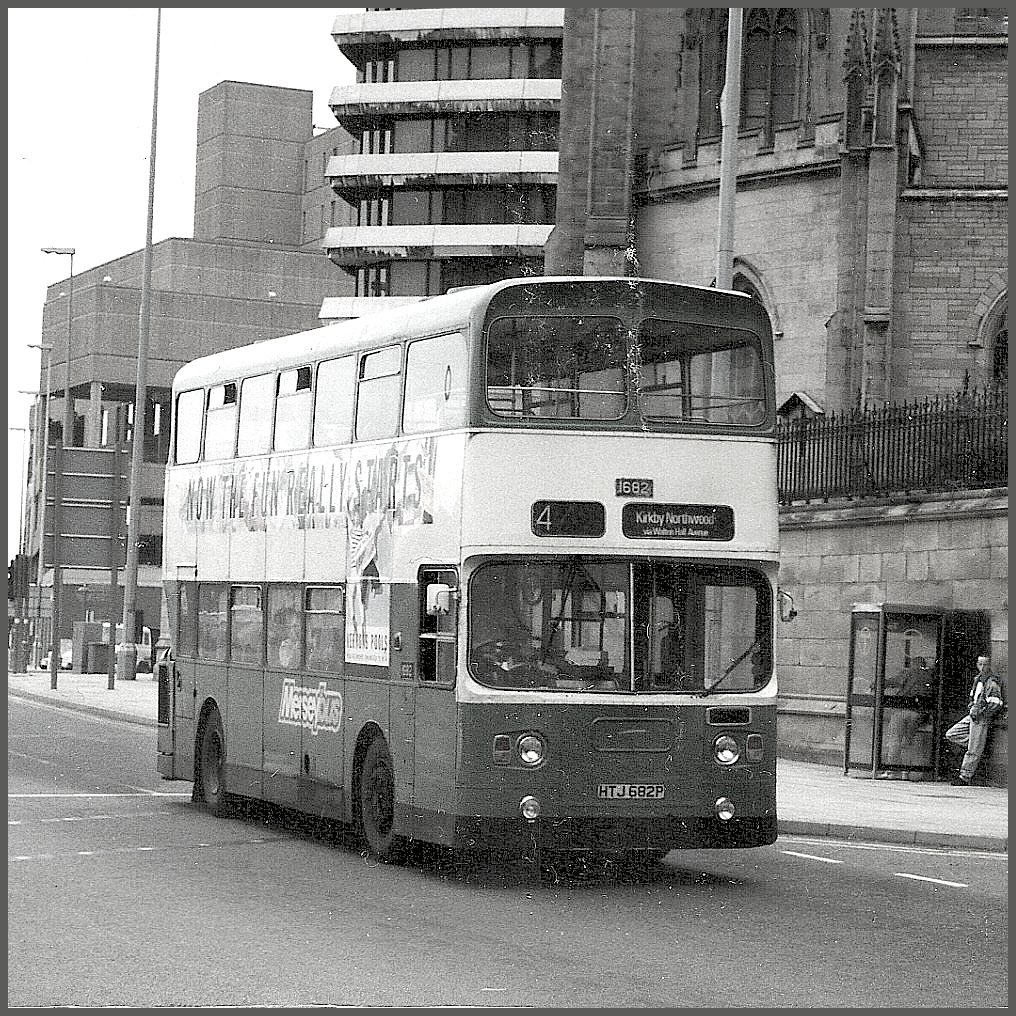
Alexander bodied Leyland Atlantean in post-deregulation livery in Liverpool

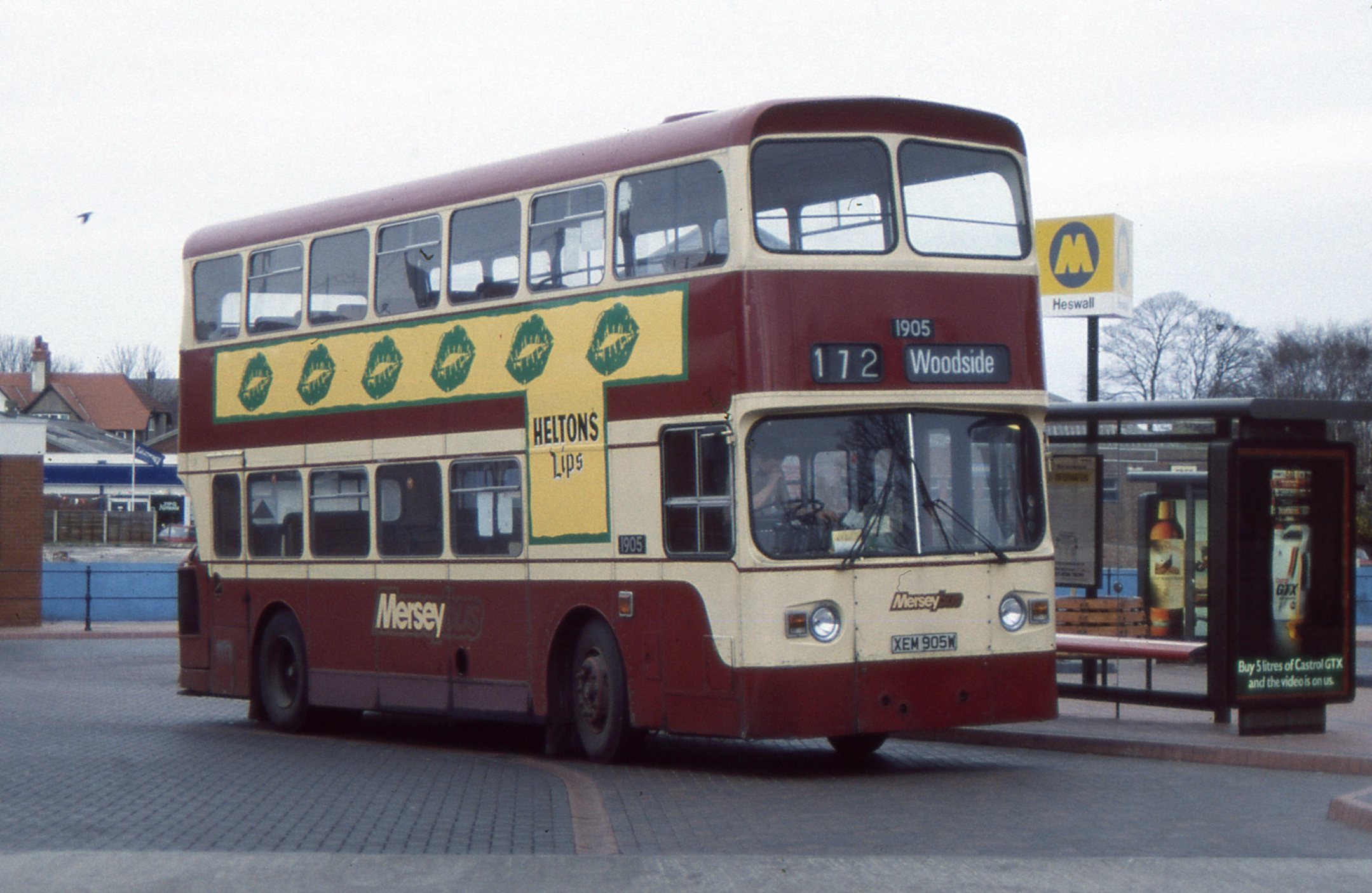
Alexander bodied Leyland Atlantean in redesigned 1988 livery at Heswall bus station, Wirral Peninsula

In advance of the deregulation of local bus and coach services on 26 October 1986, which ordered the break-up of the passenger transport executives of the United Kingdom, Merseyside PTE's bus operations, branded as 'Merseyside Transport', were transferred to a new company named Merseybus, operated at arm's length with a majority shareholding by Merseyside PTE's replacement, the Merseyside Passenger Transport Authority.

Merseybus encompassed the following depots and divisions of Merseyside Transport:

- Liverpool North Division - Gillmoss, Green Lane and Walton (Carisbroke Road, also known as Spellow Lane)
- Liverpool South Division - Edge Lane, Garston (Speke Road) and Speke (Shaw Road, also known as Woodend Avenue)
- St Helens Division - Jackson Street/Shaw Street
- Southport Division - Canning Road
- Wirral Division - Birkenhead, Laird Street

Liverpool's Prince Alfred Road (Penny Lane), Litherland and Wallasey's Seaview Road depots were not transferred to Merseybus and remained with Merseyside PTE, ultimately being sold for redevelopment. Prior to this, Merseyside PTE used these depots to store 'non-standard' vehicles Merseybus did not take on.

When deregulation took effect and Merseybus commenced operations on 26 October 1986, some services across the Merseyside area saw reduced bus frequencies as a result of the introduction of new timetables, as well as fare rises ranging from between 55% and 150%. Buses initially maintained the 'green and cream' livery of Merseyside Transport, albeit with new Merseybus logos applied over Merseyside PTE logos, later replaced by a new Merseybus livery scheme of maroon and cream in 1988, following a public trial of livery proposals in the Southport Division.

In the first years of deregulation, Merseybus invested in minibuses through its Merseymini arm and reduced fares on certain services in attempts to compete with new independent bus operators within their operating area, including Fareway Passenger Services, Topway and Liverline, who threatened to report Merseybus to the Office of Fair Trading for unfair competition. Despite this sustained competition, Merseybus turned its first operating profit of £300,000 (equivalent to £835,000 in 2025) in December 1988 following a series of company investments. By early 1989, however, this profit had turned into a £40 million (equivalent to £105,839,000 in 2025) loss as a result of Merseybus losing out on subsidised Merseytravel services to independent bus operators. To save £3 million (equivalent to £7,938,000 in 2025) in costs, 350 job losses were undertaken, while it was proposed to merge the North and South Liverpool divisions through the closure of Walton (North) and Garston (South) depots; Garston depot, however, did not close as a result of these spending cuts.

=== Privatisation ===
Following deregulation, majority shareholder Merseyside PTA, later rebranded to Merseytravel, did not immediately sell Merseybus into privatisation. Merseybus was therefore one of four former PTE and several former municipal operators in 1989 to be ordered to submit privatisation plans to Secretary of State for Transport Paul Channon, who would determine if companies should be split under section 61 of the Transport Act 1985 to enable their sale.

Despite Merseytravel's resistance, negotiations between the authority and a collective of 1,200 Merseybus employees and management towards an Employee Share Ownership Plan (ESOP) commenced around this time. In what was viewed by bidding employees as an attempt to derail a deal for the ESOP, Merseytravel introduced the £9.70 (equivalent to £21 in 2025) Solo all-week ticket in March 1992 in partnership with 29 other independent bus operators on Merseyside. The Solo ticket was not accepted on commercially operated Merseybus services, despite it being conditional to pursue the ESOP, as it directly competed with the company's £7.95 (equivalent to £18 in 2025) SuperSaver all-week ticket launched a year prior.

This conflict between Merseytravel and Merseybus was eventually resolved in December 1992 when, on the agreed condition that Solo tickets were accepted on all Merseybus services, the management and employees' ESOP buyout of Merseybus worth nearly £5.9 million (equivalent to £13,019,000 in 2025) was approved. All Merseybus vehicles and property were transferred to a new company named MTL Trust Holdings Limited, owned by 2,600 shareholding members of staff.

Merseybus was rebranded following the MTL takeover, with buses repainted into a cream, red, and silver livery featuring the MTL Trust Holdings logo above the entrance door. Regional sub-brands were introduced to the Southport and Wirral divisions in summer 1994, which became Southport & District and Wirral Peninsula Buses respectively. The Merseybus brand was among all MTL bus operations later rebranded under the unified 'MTL North' branding from spring 1998.

=== Purchase by Arriva ===
By July 1998, MTL Trust Holdings had accumulated over £10 million (equivalent to £22,066,000 in 2025) of debt from new bus leasing following major investments in modernising the bus fleet, as well as having a planned floatation on the London Stock Exchange cancelled amid an Office of Fair Trading investigation into price fixing. Efforts were initially mounted to sell to other bus operating groups in the UK, however bids by the FirstGroup, the Stagecoach Group and the Go-Ahead Group ultimately failed due to both a high asking price and the ongoing OFT investigation.

Merseybus was eventually sold with MTL Trust Holdings to Arriva on 17 February 2000 for £85 million (equivalent to £161,538,000 in 2025), with shareholding workers each receiving £13,500 (equivalent to £26,000 in 2025) in windfall gains from the sale. Arriva had already built up a substantial portfolio of bus operations in both the North West of England and parts of Wales, with origins in the region traceable back to the purchase of North Western, formerly part of Ribble Motor Services, from the National Bus Company as the Drawlane Group. Drawlane later purchased Crosville Motor Services in February 1989, making it the biggest bus operating group in the UK by owning five former National Bus Company subsidiaries and a combined fleet of over 1,600 vehicles, as well as other smaller operators in Cheshire, Greater Manchester, Merseyside and Lancashire under British Bus, prior to British Bus being purchased by the Cowie Group in 1996. These operations were subsequently grouped under Arriva North West following the Cowie Group's rebranding to Arriva in 1997.

The purchase of MTL Trust Holdings left Arriva as the dominant bus operator in a large portion of the North West of England. This caused Arriva to be referred to the Competition Commission in March 2000, resulting in a recommendation being made for Arriva to sell the former Merseybus depot in Gillmoss, consisting of over 200 buses, in order to avoid a public inquiry into the sale. Arriva was also required not to run services in competition with the independent Gillmoss depot for a total of 18 months. As a result, Glenvale Transport was formed by former Gillmoss depot management in July 2001, acquiring CMT Buses two years later and continuing as an independent operator until being purchased by the Stagecoach Group in August 2005.

== Operations ==
=== Lancashire Travel and MTL Manchester ===
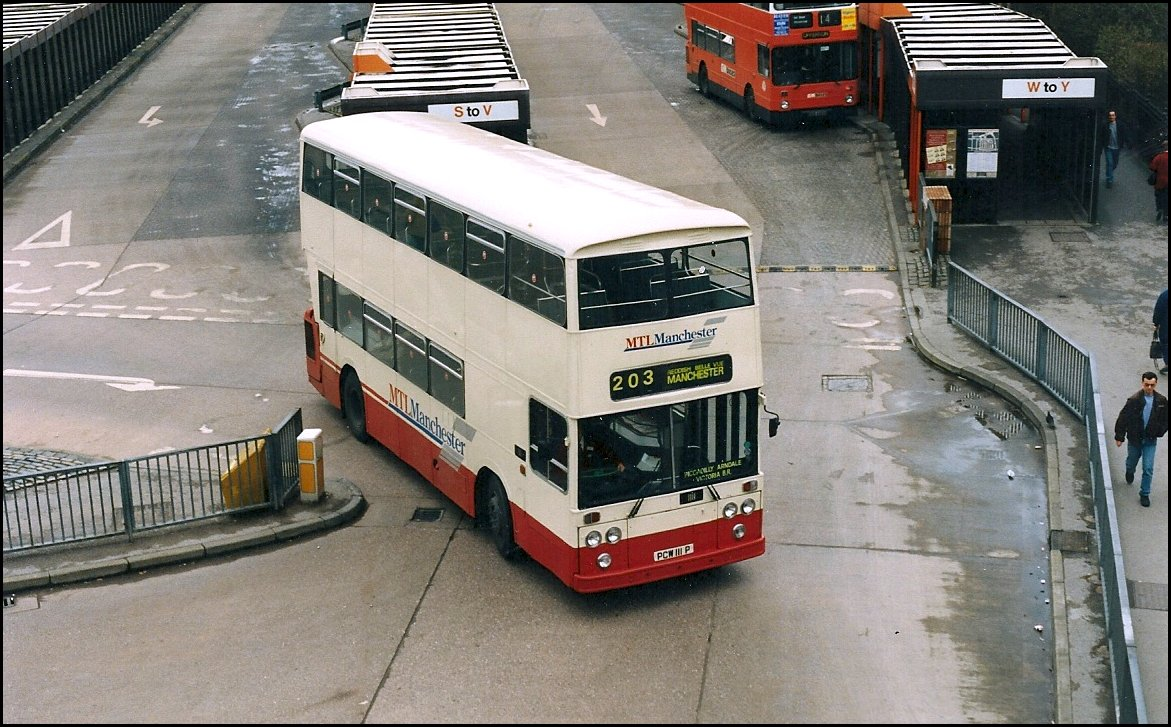
An MTL Manchester Leyland Atlantean departing Stockport bus station

Between 1988 and 1993, Merseybus began expanding the network of services operated by its St Helens depot. At first, these were to nearby Wigan but gradually, a network of Merseybus services began to appear in Bolton, Salford and Manchester. Local former PTE operator GM Buses was already competing with a number of independent operators in Greater Manchester, and the arrival of Merseybus in their established territory started a major bus war between the two companies from 1993 until the summer of 1995.

MTL launched a two-pronged attack on the Greater Manchester bus market. The first phase of this consisted of the creation of a new company, MTL Manchester, who opened a depot in the Miles Platting area of Manchester in early 1994. From 1993, MTL Manchester mainly focused on competing with GM Buses, which was sold and split into two North and South companies by Greater Manchester PTE in 1994, on city corridors in Manchester and satellite towns such as Altrincham, Bury, Sale and Stockport.

The second phase of MTL's move into Greater Manchester was to rebrand the Merseybus and St Helens Rider services operated by the St Helens depot as Lancashire Travel in the autumn of 1993, expanding onto much of the GM Buses North network of both local and interurban services in Bolton, Wigan, Leigh, Salford and North Manchester. MTL sought to bolster the Lancashire Travel fleet with second-hand MCW Metrobuses mainly acquired from London, as well as with 13 new Wright Endurance bodied Volvo B10Bs in Spring 1994. These moves provoked the GM Buses companies to set up competing companies in Liverpool and begin new services across Merseyside, with GM Buses South notably operating reviving the Birkenhead & District name using buses painted in a light blue and cream livery, and isolated incidents of stonings of rival buses being reported.

The rates of competition between the MTL and GM Buses companies in Greater Manchester and Merseyside did not prove commercially viable for the companies involved. As a result, a controversial agreement in April 1995 saw MTL close its Miles Platting depot and pull out of much of Greater Manchester, with the exception of services in Wigan and Leigh near to Lancashire Travel's St Helens depot, while the GM Buses companies pulled out from all of Merseyside, with GM Buses North closing its depot in Bootle and GM Buses South closing the Birkenhead & District operation. This agreement was subject to a study by the Monopolies and Mergers Commission which found MTL, the GM Buses companies, North Western and other Merseyside bus operators working in collusion and in breach of fair trade regulations, resulting in fines for all concerned.

Following the retreat, MTL was fined £15,000 (equivalent to £31,000 in 2025) on 13 July 1995 by the Manchester City Magistrates' court for ten offences of having operated dangerously faulty buses in and around Greater Manchester, some of which were found in Department of Transport examinations to be emitting excessive black smoke and having loose wheel nuts, body panels or window panes. This fine was briefly annulled a day later when it was ruled that the magistrates' court had exceeded its powers, however it was reinstated two weeks later. MTL maintained the Lancashire Travel branding for the St Helens depot until its services were brought under the unified MTL North brand from spring 1998.

=== Merseymaid and Silver Service ===
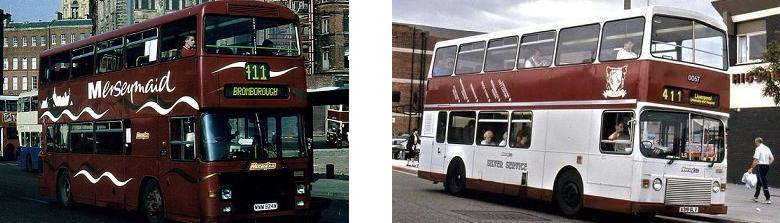
Two double-deck buses operating with Merseymaid and Silver Service

Merseymaid and Silver Service were brand names for cross-river double-deck Merseybus services between Liverpool and the Wirral via the Mersey Tunnels. Initially, a Willowbrook bodied Leyland Atlantean and five Alexander R-Type Leyland Olympians were refurbished at the Edge Lane works with soft trim, internal address systems and coach seats in November 1992, before then operating on routes 410 and 411 from Eastham to Liverpool. To attract passengers, the drivers of 'Silver Service' buses were given special customer care training, while MTL advertised a weekly ticket lower than four days' tunnel toll fees. At the end of 1995, this operation was augmented with a batch of 30 similar specification Northern Counties Palatine II bodied Volvo Olympians, which were also used on other cross-river services. Silver Service branding was dropped with the rebranding to MTL North in 1998.

=== Merseymini ===
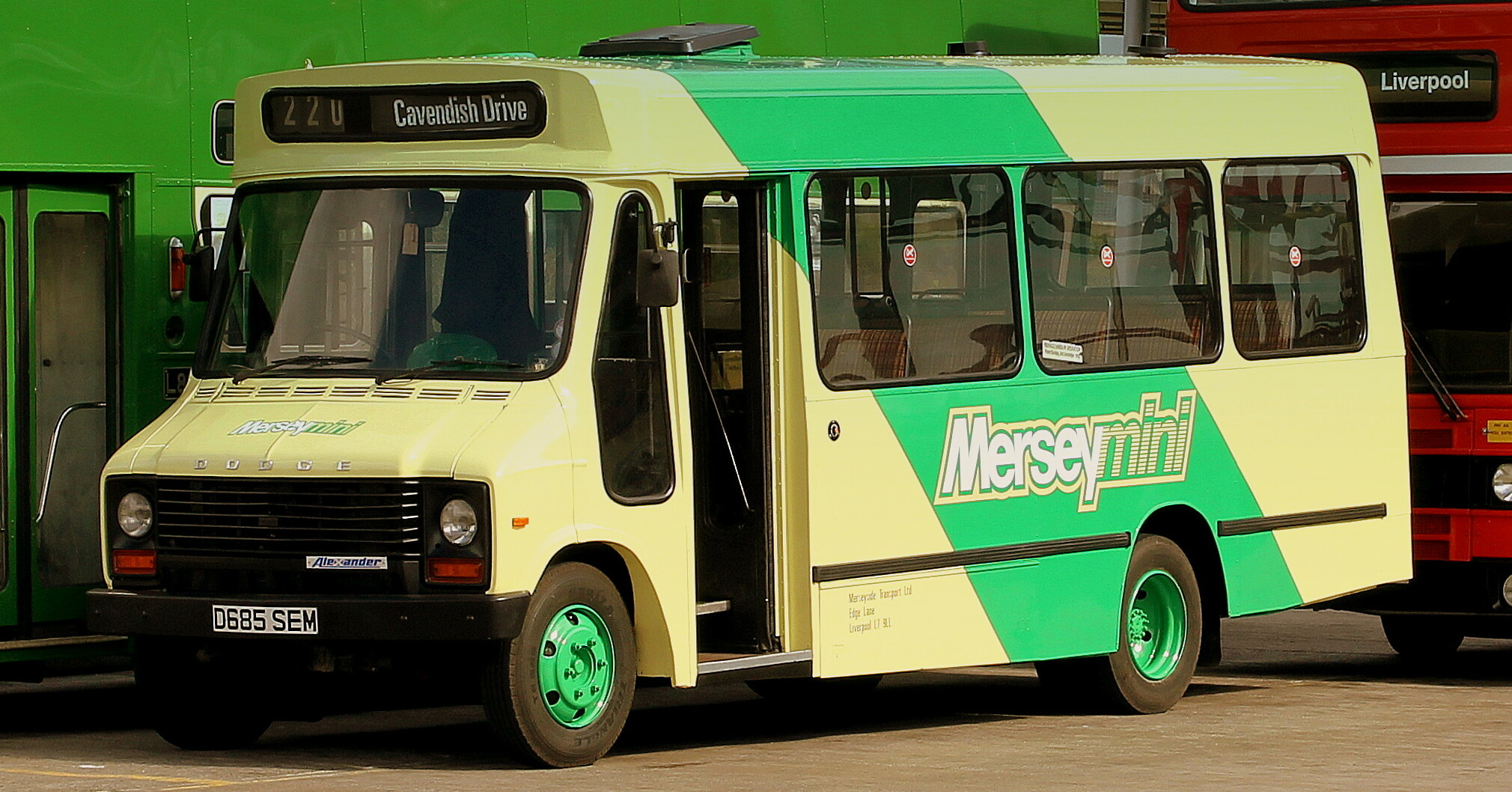
Preserved Merseymini Dodge S56

Merseymini was a branding exercise for Merseybus's attempt at minibus operation. Merseymini used a fleet of Alexander and Northern Counties bodied Dodge S56s, including some bought secondhand from GM Buses, and its most notable routes were two Merseytravel contracts and two commercial services. Other services between Huyton, Old Swan and Belle Vale were quickly dropped and the Merseymini name quietly vanished around 1992, when the low-cost MerseyRider unit became more involved with minibus operation.

== Fleet ==
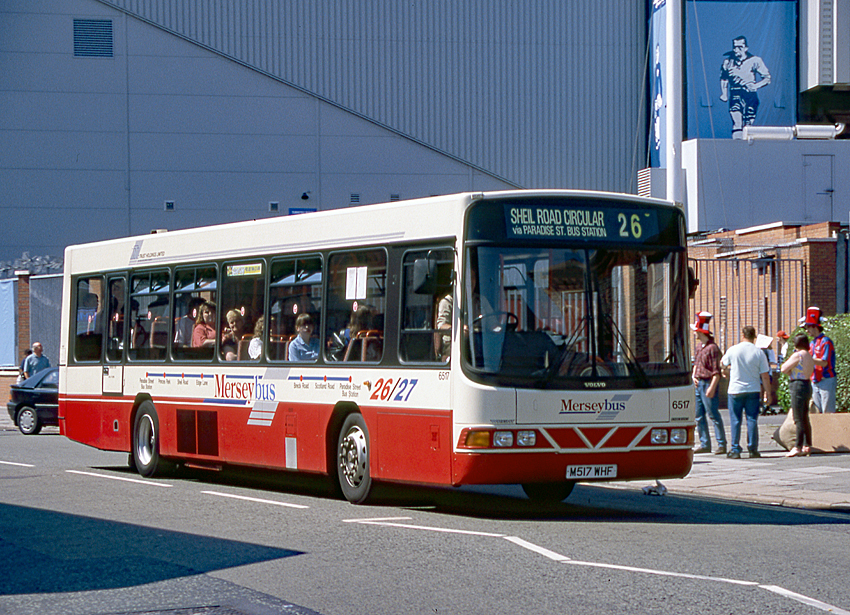
Merseybus Wright Endurance bodied Volvo B10B with Route 26/27 branding in June 1996

Upon its creation in 1986, Merseybus inherited a fleet of 1,207 buses and coaches based out of five depots across Merseyside, predominantly dominated by the largest Leyland Atlantean fleet for any bus operator. The increasing age profile of the Merseybus fleet, some approaching 20 years old or more by 1992, became a major issue for the company up to its acquisition by Arriva in 2000, resulting in heavy investment in new and second-hand buses and coaches throughout the 1990s in an effort to update the fleet.

Between 1992 and 1994, Merseybus entered into a deal with London Buses to purchase approximately 250 mid-life Leyland Titan double deckers for use by Gillmoss depot. These Titans, following mechanical assessment by MTL Engineering and an initial period of running in London configuration, were extensively refurbished to have centre exit doors removed, seats retrimmed into standard MTL moquette, fitted with accessibility features recommended by the Disabled Persons Transport Advisory Committee (DiPTAC) and being painted into standard Merseybus livery before re-entering service in Liverpool.

In February 1994, Merseybus' Green Lane depot took delivery of 12 new Neoplan N4016 integral low-floor single-deck buses. These were branded in yellow, black and white Merseytravel livery for use on a series of circular and north-south Liverpool bus services, bought as part of Merseytravel's £4 million (equivalent to £8,440,000 in 2025) SMART project, intended to improve the quality of Liverpool's bus services through investment in low-floor buses, traffic priority measures and improved infrastructure. Soon after, Merseybus increasingly standardised on new single-deck buses manufactured by Wrightbus in the mid-1990s, taking the majority of MTL's 120 Wright Endurance bodied Volvo B10Bs from 1994 to 1996, the first 13 for use in the ongoing bus war against GM Buses North on the flagship 26/27 service. These were later followed by 20 Wright Axcess-Ultralows on Scania L113 chassis during 1996.

36 new long-wheelbase Northern Counties Palatine II bodied Volvo Olympians were delivered to Merseybus between 1995 and 1996, most for use by Wirral Peninsula Buses on the cross-river 'Silver Service', with a smaller amount delivered for use in Southport. A further 22 Palatine II bodied Volvo Olympians were introduced in 1998 for operations based at Gillmoss depot in North Liverpool, branded as The Millennium Fleet.

As part of MTL North, Merseybus' final new buses before being purchased by Arriva included four Plaxton Pointer 2 bodied Dennis Dart SLFs equipped with roof-mounted compressed natural gas tanks for use as gas-powered buses on a Merseytravel park and ride service in Southport; the CNG tanks were later removed and the buses converted to diesel power when they were withdrawn from the service. These were followed by 75 Marshall Capital bodied Dennis Dart SLFs in 1999, nine of which were delivered to Southport to replace an aging fleet of Leyland Nationals.
