= Leelan =

Leelan لیلاں
- Village
- Chak 85/JB
- Location in Pakistan
- Coordinates: 31°16′0.897″N 72°53′50.388″E
- Country: Pakistan
- Province: Punjab
- District: Faisalabad District
- Tehsil: Faisalabad Sadar

Population
  - Total: 8,000 (approximately)
- Time zone: UTC+5 (PST)
- Postal code: 37521
- Calling code: 041

Leelan (Punjabi: لیلاں) is a village in Faisalabad district, in Punjab, Pakistan. The village is situated south-west of Faisalabad city and 37 km (25 km straight line) from Faisalabad Clock Tower. The population of the village is 5,000 (approximately). The major source of income is agriculture. Saag and Halwa Poori are the traditional dishes of Leelan. Urs of Sian Sadiq Shah is celebrated on 24th of Assu (coinciding with the months of September and October) according to vernacular calendar. The village has a lower literacy rate.
