= Paul Leyland (rugby league) =

English rugby league footballer

Personal information
- Full name: Paul Leyland
- Born: 28 May 1986 (age 39) England
- Height: 179 cm (5 ft 10 in)
- Weight: 102 kg (16 st 1 lb)

Playing information
- Position: Prop, Loose forward, Centre
Club
Years	Team	Pld	T	G	FG	P
2006	St. Helens	1	0	0	0	0

Paul Leyland (St. Helens) and is an English former professional rugby league footballer who was a professional with St. Helens in the Super League and formerly played in their reserve side. He is a loose forward by preference but could also play at prop or centre. He attended Broadway High School, and signed for St Helens from local amateur side Portico Vine ARLFC. He made his first-team début in the 2006's Super League XI when Saints played a mostly reserve team against Catalans Dragons in preparation for their upcoming Challenge Cup Final. He now coaches the under-20s as an assistant to Ian Talbot.
