= Leland Hotel (Richmond, Indiana) =

- U.S. National Register of Historic Places
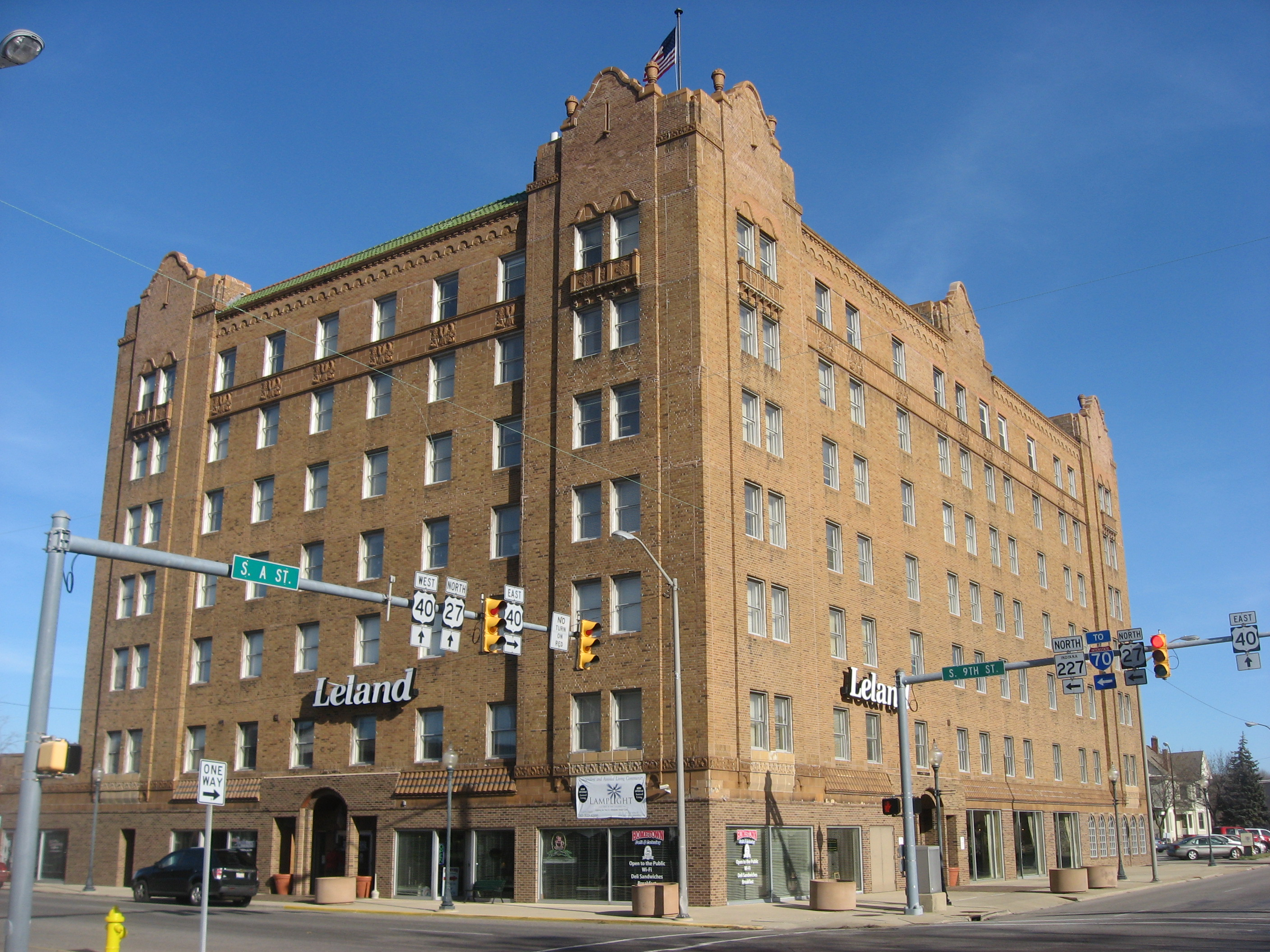
- Leland Hotel, December 2012

- Location within Indiana Location within the United States
- Location: 900 S. A St., Richmond, Indiana
- Coordinates: 39°49′38″N 84°53′24″W
- Area: less than one acre
- Built: 1928
- Architect: Nichols, Charles Wheeler
- Architectural style: Mission/spanish Revival
- NRHP reference No.: 85000362
- Added to NRHP: February 28, 1985

Leland Hotel, also known as the Leland Motor Inn, is a historic hotel building located in Richmond, Indiana. It was built in 1928, and is a seven-story, U-shaped, Mission Revival style reinforced concrete building sheathed in light brown brick dwelling. The building was modernized in the mid-1960s and many of the original details were covered or removed. It is the tallest building in Richmond.

It was listed on the National Register of Historic Places in 1985.
