= Leyland Titan (B15) =

Integral rear-engined double-decker bus

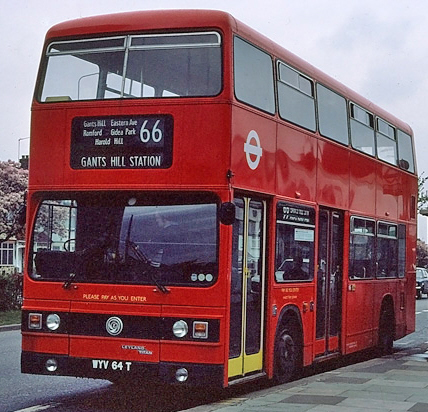
- London Transport Leyland Titan at Gants Hill station on route 66 in April 1980

Overview
- Manufacturer: British Leyland
- Production: 1977–1984
- Assembly: Park Royal Vehicles; Park Royal, London Borough of Ealing, England; Leyland Bus; Workington, Cumbria, England

Body and chassis
- Doors: 1 or 2
- Floor type: Step entrance

Powertrain
- Engine: Gardner 6LXB; Leyland TL11
- Transmission: Leyland Hydracyclic 5-speed automatic

Dimensions
- Length: 9.56 metres (31.4 ft)
- Width: 2.50 metres (8 ft 2 in)
- Height: 4.40 metres (14.4 ft)

Chronology
- Predecessor: Bristol VRT; Daimler Fleetline; Leyland Atlantean
- Successor: Leyland Olympian

The Leyland B15 Titan is a rear-engined double-decker bus manufactured by British Leyland between 1977 and 1984, primarily for London Transport.

== Development ==
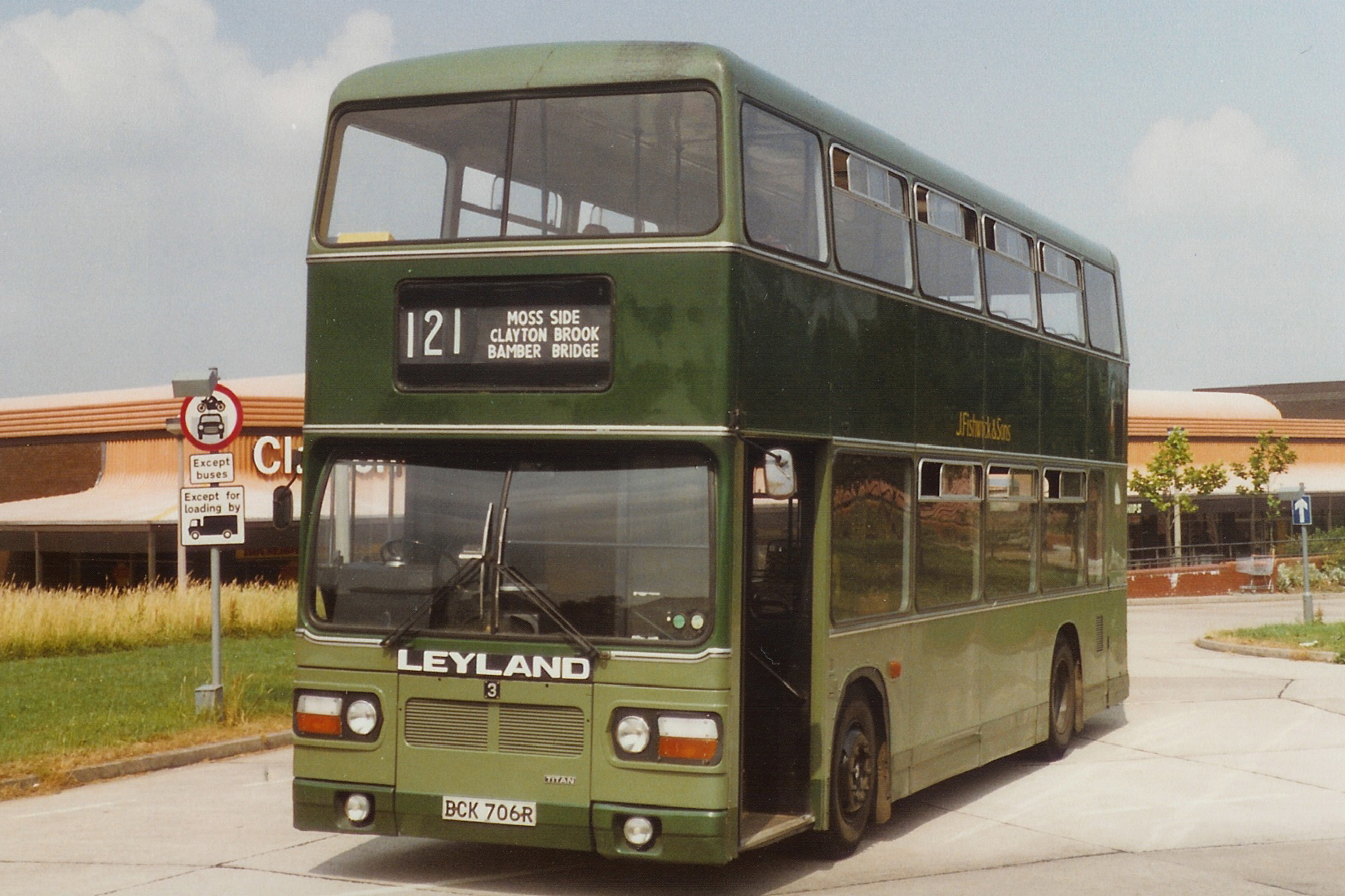
John Fishwick & Sons pre-production Titan in the 1980s

First exhibited at the 1973 Transport and Road Research Laboratory exhibition, the Titan was conceived by British Leyland's Truck and Bus division as project B15, intended as a replacement for the Bristol VRT, Daimler Fleetline and Leyland Atlantean and developed in direct competition with the forthcoming Scania Metropolitan and the Volvo Ailsa B55. Following the success of the single-decker Leyland National, it was decided that from the outset, the vehicle would be very standardised, of integral construction, and compliant with all known commercial vehicle regulations worldwide. This allowed more flexibility in the location of mechanical components and allowed a reduced step-height. The move away from body-on-chassis construction caused concern for the bodybuilders, who had already lost market share to the Leyland National. Talks regarding licensing agreements were held with Alexander and Northern Counties, both major suppliers to their respective local markets, but no agreements were reached by Leyland.

Five prototypes (B15.01-B15.05) were constructed between 1975 and 1977, two of which were evaluated in London. Upon the B15's public launch in June 1977, the Titan name, previously used for a front-engined double-decker, was formally revived for the B15.

=== Specification ===
The Titan was 9.56 metres (31.4 ft) long, 2.50 metres (8 ft 2 in) wide and 4.4 metres (14 ft) high. The main body structure was aluminium and the body was assembled using Avdel 'Avdelok' rivets similar to the Leyland National. Single and dual-door layouts were offered, with a number of options for the location of the staircase, and deeper windows, including one offset at the rear, were standard along the lower deck. Mechanically, independent front suspension and a drop-centre rear axle were used, with air suspension and power hydraulic brakes as standard.

The prototype engine was the Leyland 501, a turbocharged version of the Leyland 500 series, although this was changed to Gardner 6LXB for production as a result of customer preference and concerns over fuel economy and reliability of the 500 series. The Leyland TL11 engine was available for later production versions. The engine was mounted vertically at the rear, with the radiator moved from the engine to a separate compartment above the engine in an effort to reduce noise emissions, and was mated to Leyland's all-new Hydracyclic five-speed gearbox.

=== Production issues ===
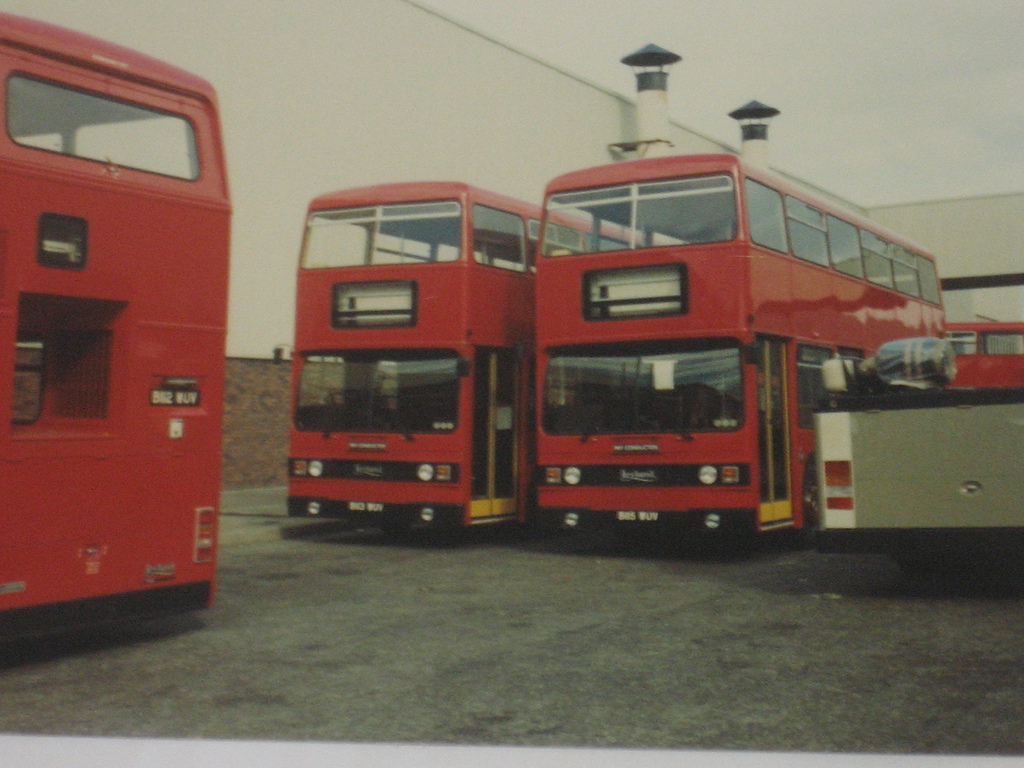
Leyland-bodied Leyland Titans awaiting delivery to London Transport at Leyland's Workington factory in October 1984

With the Titan chassis being produced at Leyland's Workington factory, which also built the Leyland National, it was intended that Park Royal Vehicles would body the first 100 Leyland Titans, with body production then transferring to AEC in Southall, as part of a London Transport-National Bus Company joint venture named Bus Manufacturers (Holding) Ltd. This caused industrial relations problems at Park Royal, with the factory's skilled workers not approving of assembling prefabricated Titan components, and as a result, production commenced very slowly.

In October 1978, as a result of competition in the area for skilled workers and an inability to expand the site, Leyland announced the AEC factory would close, with the intention of keeping Titan production at Park Royal. The very slow production rate continued at both factories, causing the cancellation of a number of existing orders, and industrial relations problems continued as Leyland sought to replace the skilled staff, who had left, with semi-skilled workers. Finally, Leyland announced in October 1979 that Park Royal would close in May 1980. Once this decision had been made and a productivity-related redundancy package negotiated, production increased dramatically; whereas Park Royal had taken 14 months to build the first 100 vehicles, it took just seven months to build the final 150.

Efforts to transfer production to Eastern Coach Works in Lowestoft failed, with ECW's skilled workers rejecting the hiring of unskilled and semi-skilled workers to assemble Titan bodies, so after considering moving production to Charles H. Roe in Leeds, Leyland finally decided that production would recommence at an expanded facility at their Workington factory, consisting entirely of a semi-skilled workforce. It took almost a year to expand the facility, transfer the jigs and tooling from Park Royal and recommence production, with the first thirteen Titans initially built in a temporary facility near the Workington factory.

As well as the production difficulties, other aspects of the Titan specification, which was strongly influenced by London Transport, were unpopular. Power hydraulic brakes, a fixed height of 14 feet 5 inches (4.39 m) and an inability to specify local bodywork all limited the Titan's appeal. The continued delays and unpopular specification both caused the loss of further Titan orders.

London Transport's orders were split between the Titan and the MCW Metrobus, but production of Titan for London alone was proving uneconomic. Leyland lobbied for London Transport to increase the Titan share of its double-decker orders, and as a result, Leyland received the entire order for 275 vehicles in 1982, leading to layoffs at Metro Cammell Weymann. The 1983 order also favoured Leyland, with 210 Titan and 150 Metrobuses. After London Transport decided not to order any more Titans, deeming it too expensive for its needs, Leyland ended production of the Titan upon the completion of a final batch of 240 in 1984, refocusing production towards the new and cheaper Olympian chassis.

== Operators ==
=== London Transport ===
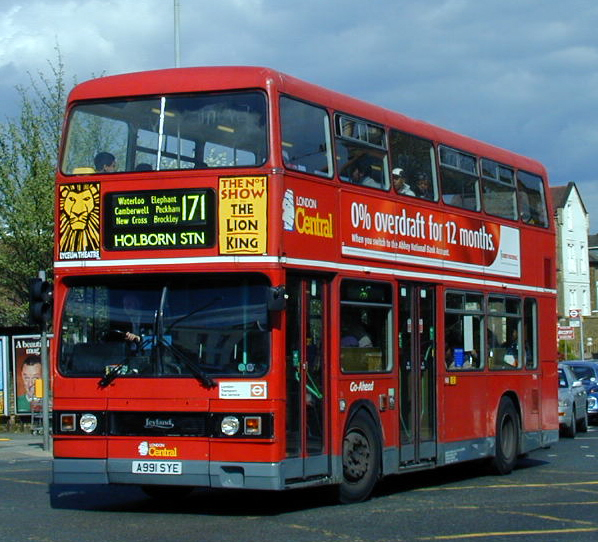
London Central Leyland Titan in Forest Hill in May 2001

The orders from London Transport were as follows:

- 1979: 100 (T1–100)
- 1980: 150 (T101–250) (Note: Reduced from 250 due to ongoing industrial disputes at Park Royal)
- 1981: 150 (T251–400)
- 1982: 275 (T401–675)
- 1983: 210 (T676–885)
- 1984: 240 (T886–1125)

The first production Titans were delivered in August 1978 and entered service at Hornchurch garage in December 1978 on routes 165, 246 and 252. The Titan debuted a new destination display format for London Transport, with the front route number and via point blinds united into one wider and taller blind, with a similar change made to the doorside route and destination blind. The first 100 Titans were also fitted with automatic fare collection cabinets by the front entrance door, however they were removed from May 1979 with more seats fitted in their place as London Transport moved the responsibility of fare collection on one-person operated buses to the driver.

The Titan's London Transport service career saw it working in the eastern and south eastern half of the capital, though a surplus of the type following tendering reverses in the later 1980s saw Titans spread to some north London garages. Withdrawals began in December 1992, just after the last Daimler Fleetline buses had been withdrawn, and upon the privatisation of the London Buses subsidiaries, the remaining Titans were distributed between London Central, Stagecoach East London and Stagecoach Selkent; one of the final Titan deliveries, fleet number T990 operated by London Central, was destroyed in the Aldwych bus bombing on 18 February 1996.

Stagecoach East London's last Titans were withdrawn in September 2001 and Selkent's in November 2001, leaving London Central with a small number of spare buses which were eventually whittled down. Amid a gathering of enthusiasts, the last Titan in London service, T1018 from London Central's Camberwell garage, was withdrawn after completing service on route 40 on 19 June 2003.

=== Outside London ===
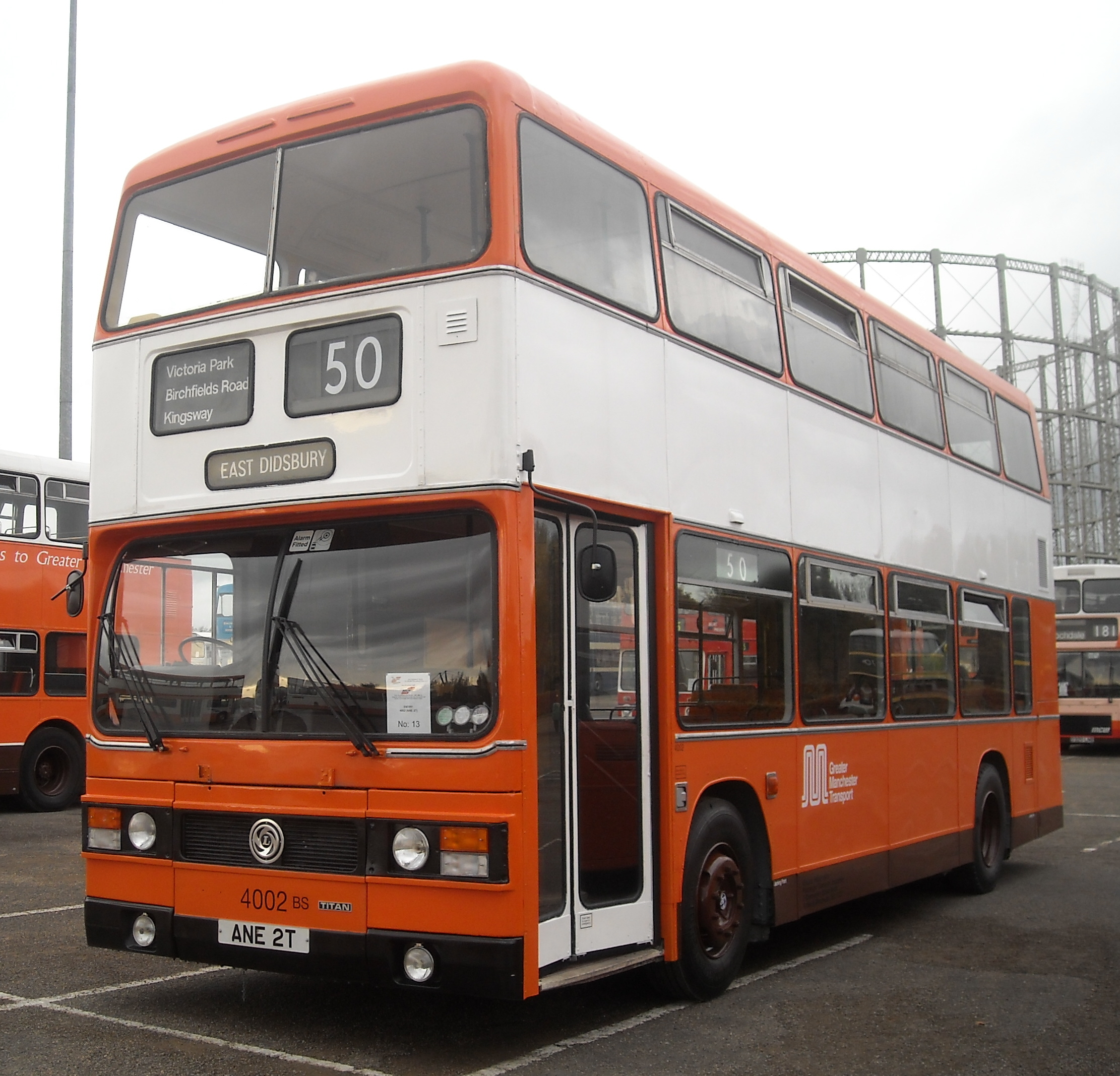
Preserved Greater Manchester Transport Titan in October 2009

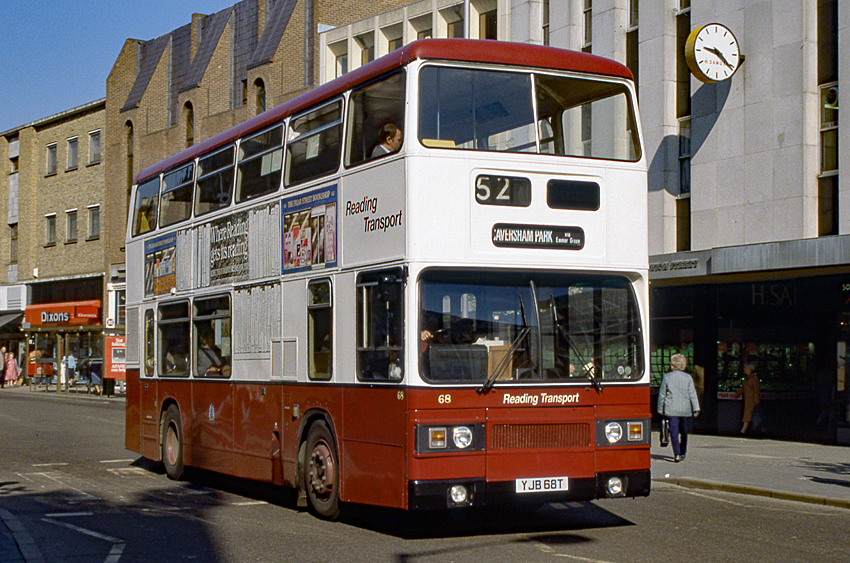
Reading Transport Leyland Titan with Park Royal body in Friar Street

Outside London, only two of the passenger transport executives of the United Kingdom ultimately took delivery of Titans, albeit in smaller numbers than originally ordered. The largest operator of the two was the Greater Manchester Passenger Transport Executive (GMPTE), who ordered 190 Titans in 1979, however after only 15 were delivered due to the closure of the Park Royal factory, GMPTE cancelled the remainder and replaced the Titans with an order for 160 MCW Metrobuses. The West Midlands Passenger Transport Executive (WMPTE) also took delivery of five Titan demonstrators for use across its network and ordered 80 production examples, however WMPTE also cancelled this order upon the closure of Park Royal and purchased 101 locally-produced MCW Metrobuses, as well as 35 Leyland Nationals, later selling the demonstrators as non-standard to London Buses subsidiary Selkent.

Reading Transport took delivery of two Park Royal Titans to full London specification in 1979, later taking delivery of a further ten Titans from Workington in 1983, five of which had high-ratio rear axles and coach seats for express services into London. Planned orders for the Scottish Bus Group, Greater Glasgow PTE, Lothian Regional Transport, Maidstone & District, Merseyside Transport, Southend Transport and Tyne & Wear Transport were eventually cancelled due to the production delays.

One Titan was exported to Hong Kong and entered service with China Motor Bus. A 36 feet (11 m) long version of the Titan had been planned for this operator but that too was cancelled as a result of the difficulties at Park Royal, with two Leyland Victory Mark 2s built instead. A demonstrator, built in 1982, failed to secure any further orders, operators preferring the flexibility and lower cost of the Leyland Olympian. This vehicle was eventually sold to a Scottish independent operator, Ian Glass of Haddington.

==== Ex-London vehicles ====
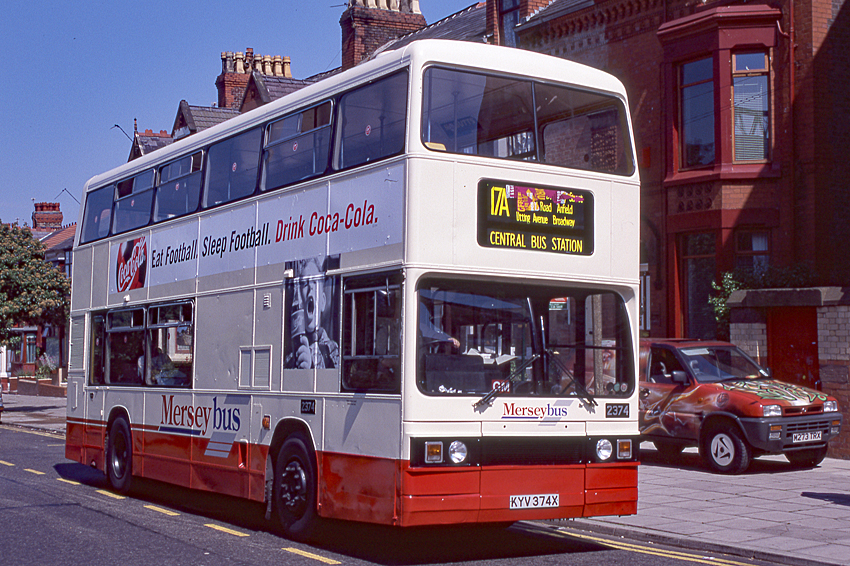
Merseybus ex-London Transport Leyland Titan in Anfield in 1994

The most significant user of former London Titans was Merseyside's largest bus operator Merseybus, who between 1992 and 1994, purchased approximately 250 Titans in a deal with London Buses for use by Gillmoss depot in Liverpool. These Titans, following mechanical assessment by in-house engineering company MTL Engineering and an initial period of running in London configuration, were extensively refurbished before re-entering service in Liverpool to replace life-expired Leyland Atlanteans in the Merseybus fleet, having centre exit doors removed, seats retrimmed into standard MTL moquette, accessibility features fitted under the recommendations of the Disabled Persons Transport Advisory Committee (DiPTAC) and being painted into standard Merseybus livery.

Parent company MTL Trust Holdings Ltd also transferred ex-London Titans to Merseyside from its London division, and ultimately, approximately 400 ex-London Titans came to Merseyside with Merseybus and the other companies within MTL. as well as many other bus companies within the Merseyside region like Aintree Coachlines, Avon Buses, GTL, Liverpool City Coaches/Citybus, Merseyline Travel and Village Group. A few of these Merseyside operators also used ex-Greater Manchester and West Midlands Titans as well and Village Group also operated the B15 prototype, NHG 732P, for a brief period during 1997-98 before being acquired by MTL in 1998.

Other users of ex-London Titans around this time included the Oxford Bus Company and Kinchbus. Further buses remained on London work under the ownership of independent contractors such as London Suburban Buses, London & Country, Borehamwood Travel Services, Blue Triangle and London Coaches' Atlas Bus subsidiary. Big Bus Tours took delivery of numerous ex-London Central Titans and had them converted to open top buses for London sightseeing operations between 1998 and 2003,
