= Leland =

Leland may refer to:

== Places ==
=== United States ===
- Leland, Illinois, a village
- Leland, Iowa, a city
- Leland, Michigan, an unincorporated community and census-designated place
- Leland, Mississippi, a city
- Leland, North Carolina, a town
- Leland, Oregon, an unincorporated community
- Leland, Utah, an unincorporated community
- Leland, Washington, an unincorporated community
- Leland, Wisconsin, an unincorporated community
- Leland Township, Michigan
- Leland River, Michigan
- Leland Pond, New York
- Mount Leland (Alaska), a mountain

=== Elsewhere ===
- Leland, Norway, a village
- Mount Leland, Victoria Land, Antarctica

== People ==
=== Given name ===
- Leland Austin (born 1986), American rapper under the stage name Yung L.A.
- Leland Bardwell (1922–2016), Irish poet, novelist and playwright
- Leland Chapman (born 1976), American bounty hunter on the reality television series Dog the Bounty Hunter
- Leland Christensen (1959–2022), American politician
- Leland D. Melvin (born 1964), American engineer and retired astronaut
- Leland Faust (born 1946), American financial advisor
- Leland Irving (born 1988), Canadian ice hockey goaltender
- Leland Orser (born 1960), American actor
- Leland Palmer (actress) (born 1945), American actress, dancer, and singer
- Leland Rayson (1921–2001), American lawyer and politician
- Leland Sklar (born 1947), American bassist and session musician
- Leland Stanford (1824–1893), American industrialist and politician, founder of Stanford University, Governor of California
- Leland Stanford Jr. (1868–1884), namesake of Stanford University, only son of Leland Stanford
- E. Leland Taylor (1885–1948), mayor of Louisville, Kentucky
- Leland Wayne (born 1993), American record producer under the stage name Metro Boomin
- Leland Wilkinson (1944–2021), American statistician and computer scientist
- Leland Yee (born 1948), former State Senator of California and convicted criminal

=== Surname ===
Note: Leland is a traditional Irish surname.

- Burton Leland (1948–2018), American social worker and businessman
- Charles Godfrey Leland, American humorist and folklorist
- David J. Leland, American politician from Ohio
- David Leland (1941–2023), British director, screenwriter and actor
- Evelyn Leland (1867–1931), American astronomer
- Frank Leland, Negro league baseball team owner of the Leland Giants
- Gabe Leland (born 1982), American politician
- George W. Leland, American Civil War Medal of Honor recipient
- Hayne Leland, economist
- Henry M. Leland, automotive pioneer and founder of Cadillac and Lincoln brands
- John Leland (antiquary), English antiquary
- John Leland (Baptist), United States Baptist minister
- John Leland (journalist), reporter, columnist, and book author
- John Leland (politician), English Member of Parliament for Stamford, 1796–1808
- John Leland (Presbyterian), English Presbyterian minister
- John E. Leland, American engineer and Director of the University of Dayton Research Institute
- Mabel Johnson Leland (1871–1947), American lecturer, translator
- Mickey Leland, United States Congressman from Texas
- Sara Leland, American ballet dancer and répétiteur
- Sherman Leland (1783–1853), President of the Massachusetts Senate
- Simeon Leland, American businessman, hotelier
- Thomas Leland, Irish historian
- Waldo Leland, American historian and archivist

=== Stage name ===
- Leland (musician) (born 1987), stage name of Brett Leland McLaughlin, American singer and songwriter

== Fictional characters ==
- Joe Leland, protagonist in The Detective novel (1966) and movie adaptation (1968)
- Lee Adama (Leland Joseph Adama), in the TV series Battlestar Galactica (2004)
- Leland Gaunt, in the Stephen King book Needful Things
- Leland Owlsley, a.k.a. Owl, a Marvel Comics supervillain
- Leland Palmer, in the TV series Twin Peaks
- Leland Stottlemeyer, in the TV series Monk
- Leland Turbo, in the movie Cars 2

== Schools ==
- Leland College, a former college for blacks in New Orleans, Louisiana, on the National Register of Historic Places
- Leland High School (San Jose, California)
- Leland High School (Leland, Illinois)
- Leland High School (Leland, Mississippi)

== Other uses ==
- Midway Studios San Diego, formerly Leland Corporation, an arcade game manufacturer
- Leland Giants, a Negro league baseball team based in Chicago
- Leland Hotel (disambiguation)
- Leland Initiative, USAID program to improve internet connectivity in Africa

== See also ==
- Leland I, a sculpture in Portland, Oregon
- Leland Trail, a footpath in Somerset, England
- Leeland (disambiguation)
- Leighland
- Lelan, a given name and surname
- Leyland (disambiguation)
- McLelan, a surname
