= Layland v Ontario (Minister of Consumer and Commercial Relations) =

Canadian legal case dealing with same sex marriage

- Court: Ontario Divisional Court
- Full case name: Re Layland and Beaulne and Ontario Minister of Consumer & Commercial Relations
- Decided: March 15, 1993
- Citations: 1993 CanLII 8676 (ON SC); 14 OR (3d) 658; 104 DLR (4th) 214; [1993] OJ No 575 (QL)

Court membership
- Judges sitting: James Bonham Strange Southey, Jean−Charles Sirois, and Susan E. Greer JJ.

Case opinions
- The common law limitation of marriage to persons of opposite sex does not constitute discrimination against the applicants contrary to s. 15 of the Charter. The application is dismissed.
- Decision by: Southey J.
- Concurrence: Sirois J.
- Dissent: Greer J.

Layland v Ontario (Minister of Consumer and Commercial Relations) was a 1993 case brought towards the Ontario Divisional Court (Superior Court) after a same-sex couple was denied a marriage license at Ottawa City Hall. The couple sought judicial review of the decision by the Ottawa City Clerk to deny them a marriage license, arguing that the acknowledged common law prohibition of same-sex couples from marriage violated their rights under section 15 of the Canadian Charter of Rights and Freedoms by discriminating on the basis of their sex.

In a 2-1 decision, judges of the Ontario Divisional Court dismissed the application for an order requiring the issue of a marriage licence, ruling "that under the common law of Canada applicable to Ontario a valid marriage can take place only between a man and a woman."
