= Leeland, Virginia =

Unincorporated community in Virginia, US

Coordinates: 38°20′59″N 77°26′01″W

Leeland is an unincorporated community in Stafford County, in the U.S. state of Virginia.
