= Passenger transport executive =

Government bodies responsible for public transport

In the United Kingdom, passenger transport executives (PTEs) are local government bodies which are responsible for public transport within large urban areas. They are accountable to combined authorities, which were created between 2011 and 2016 and took the role of integrated transport authorities (ITAs). The PTEs have joined together to form the Urban Transport Group (Passenger Transport Executive Group (PTEG) until 2016), in which Transport for London and Strathclyde Partnership for Transport also participate.

== History ==
=== Transport Act 1968 ===
The first PTEs and passenger transport authorities (PTAs) were established in the late 1960s by the Transport Act 1968 as transport authorities serving large conurbations, by the then transport minister Barbara Castle. Prior to this, public transport was run by individual local authorities and private companies, with little co-ordination. The PTEs took over municipal bus operations from individual councils, and became responsible for managing local rail networks.

The 1968 act created five PTE/As. These were:

- West Midlands on 1 October 1969
- SELNEC (South East Lancashire & North East Cheshire) on 1 November 1969 (now Greater Manchester)
- Merseyside on 1 December 1969 (now Liverpool City Region)
- Tyneside on 1 January 1970 (now Tyne and Wear)
- Greater Glasgow on 1 June 1973 (now Strathclyde)

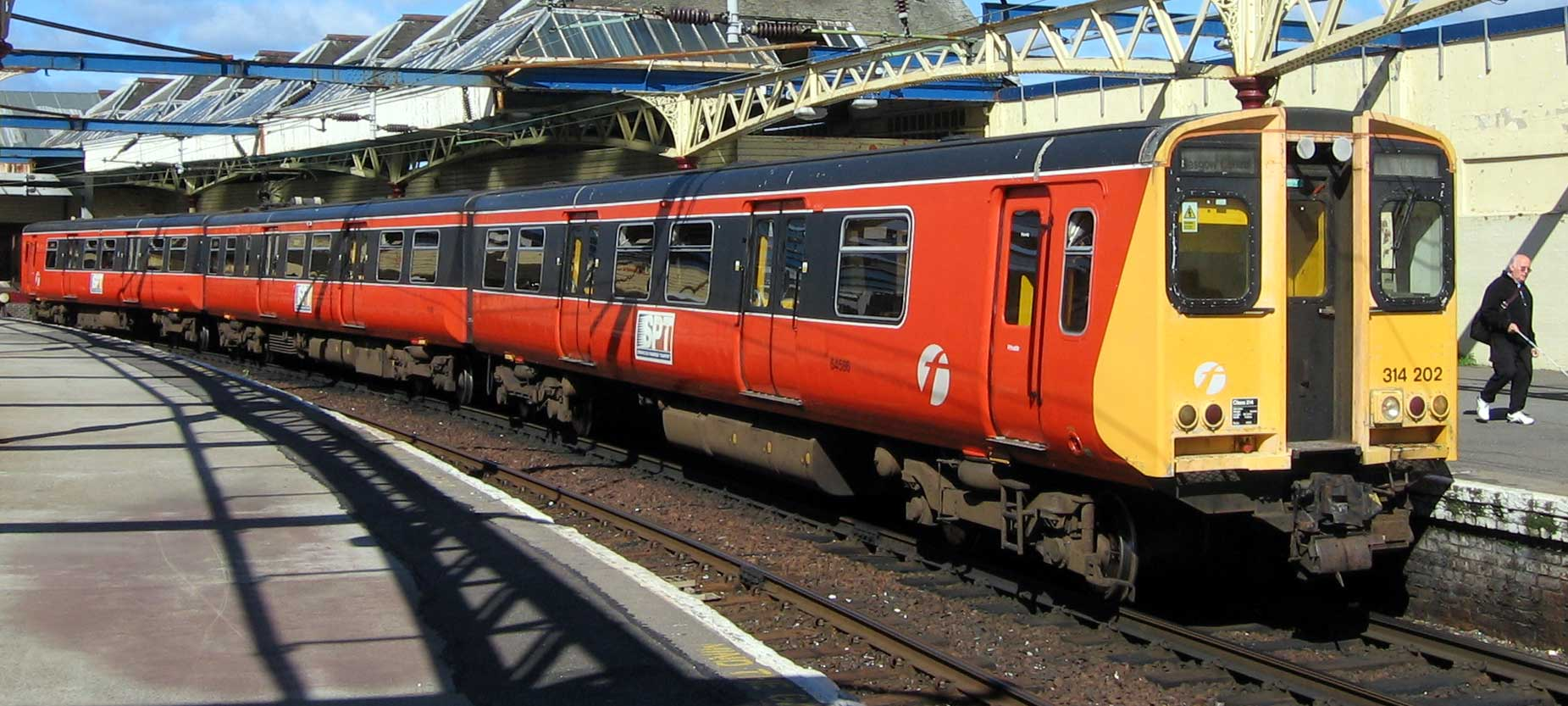
British Rail Class 314 train in orange and black Strathclyde Passenger Transport livery.

Initially they covered slightly different areas from the ones covered by integrated transport authorities today.

=== 1970s local government reform ===
Local government in England was re-organised in 1974 by the Local Government Act 1972. The re-organisation created the six metropolitan counties, and the existing four English PTEs were named after, and made to match the borders of the new counties (for example West Midlands PTE was expanded to take on Coventry and Tyneside PTE expanded to include Sunderland becoming Tyne and Wear PTE in the process). In addition to this, two new PTEs were created for the newly established metropolitan counties of South Yorkshire and West Yorkshire.

The 1974 reorganisation also abolished the PTAs, and their role was taken over by the metropolitan county council (MCCs). However, when the MCCs were abolished in 1986, the PTAs were re-created.

Local government re-organisation in Scotland in 1975 created the region of Strathclyde, and the existing Greater Glasgow PTE was named after, and made to cover the new region.

=== Local Government Act 1985 ===
PTAs were recreated by the Local Government Act 1985 when the metropolitan county councils were abolished.

The Local Government etc. (Scotland) Act 1994 had the same effect in the Strathclyde Region.

=== Transport Act 1985 ===
Until the mid-1980s the PTEs operated bus services in their areas, but bus deregulation by the Transport Act 1985 forced them to separate their bus operations into new arms lengths companies. These were called PTC's which were all sold off by the mid 1990s. The PTE's were also stripped of their powers to regulate the fares and timetables of private bus operators.

=== Local Transport Act 2008 ===
A number of changes to PTE/As were made under the Local Transport Act 2008. The main changes made were:

- Passenger transport authorities (PTAs) were renamed as integrated transport authorities (ITAs) although PTEs have retained their current names.
- The bill allowed for the possibility of new PTEs being created, and for the areas of existing ones to be altered.
- The bill strengthened the powers of PTEs/ITAs to regulate bus services, and makes ITAs the sole transport planning authorities in their areas.

The integrated transport authorities (ITAs) from 2008 onwards are the bodies which administer the executives; they are made up of councillors representing the areas served by the PTEs. They are responsible for funding the PTEs, and making the policies which the PTEs carry out on their behalf. PTEs secure services on behalf of the ITA but it is the ITA that pays for them.

In the six metropolitan counties, councillors are appointed to the ITAs or the transport committees of combined authorities by the metropolitan boroughs, or in the case of Strathclyde by the twelve unitary authority councils in the area.

The ITAs are not "precepting authorities", so they have to negotiate a "levy" every year that is applied to council tax collected by the local authorities in the areas that they serve. The executive usually requests a budget and the council representatives on the ITAs negotiate from this position.

It is worth bearing in mind that PTEs do not, strictly speaking, own anything - their role is a statutory one to provide services using the resources provided to them by the ITAs.

== Current structure ==
There are currently six passenger transport executives in England, covering areas which correspond - though are not limited - to metropolitan counties. When a combined authority is created the integrated transport area and integrated transport authority are replaced with the combined area and combined authority. This happened in Greater Manchester on 1 April 2011 and happened in three other integrated transport areas from 1 April 2014: to become the larger Liverpool City Region, as well as Sheffield City Region, and West Yorkshire combined areas. In South Yorkshire, West Yorkshire and West Midlands, the PTE has been absorbed into the combined authority, and is no longer a separate legal entity; in these areas the combined authority itself is the executive.

| Area | Combined authority | Passenger transport executive |
|---|---|---|
| Greater Manchester | Greater Manchester Combined Authority | Transport for Greater Manchester |
| Liverpool City Region | Liverpool City Region Combined Authority | Merseytravel |
| South Yorkshire | South Yorkshire Mayoral Combined Authority | Travel South Yorkshire |
| Tyne and Wear; County Durham; Northumberland | North East Combined Authority | Nexus |
| West Midlands | West Midlands Combined Authority | Transport for West Midlands |
| West Yorkshire | West Yorkshire Combined Authority | Metro |

=== Functions ===
- The ITAs are now responsible for subsidising bus services which are not profitable to run but are considered socially necessary, and the PTEs organise this role on their behalf. They are also responsible for providing bus shelters and stations.
- Most PTEs do not operate public transport services. There are a limited number of cases where they do - Liverpool City Region's Merseytravel, acting as a sui generis authority, leases the franchise to operate its Merseyrail publicly owned railway service, the Tyne and Wear PTE operates the Tyne and Wear Metro, and Strathclyde Passenger Transport operates the Glasgow Subway. In Liverpool City Region, Strathclyde, and Tyne and Wear, some ferry services are operated by the PTEs. In South Yorkshire, the combined authority owns and operates the Supertram system.
- The PTEs, on the ITAs' behalf, have retained more powers over local train services, which they do not operate but are responsible for setting fares and timetables of.
- The PTEs are also responsible for planning and funding new public transport facilities, such as light rail systems and new stations.
- They fund concessionary travel schemes for the elderly and disabled including free passes and "Dial-a-Ride" services.
- They are also responsible for giving out travel information about transport services.
- The Transport Act 2000 made the then PTAs (now ITAs) and metropolitan boroughs jointly responsible for producing local transport plans in their areas.

In recent years the PTEs and ITAs have campaigned to be given more powers to regulate local bus services, as is the case in London (see London Buses).

=== Urban Transport Group ===
The Passenger Transport Executive Group (PTEG) was a federated body based in Leeds to bring together and promote the interests of the six PTEs in England, plus associate members Strathclyde Partnership for Transport; Transport for London; Nottingham City Council; and Bristol and the West of England.

PTEG's main tasks were facilitating the exchange of knowledge and good practice within the PTE network, and raising awareness nationally about the key transport challenges which face the city regions, and the public transport solutions which PTEs are implementing.

PTEG's strategy and policy was determined by the Directors General of the PTEs, who met every quarter. It administered a number of specialist task groups which bring together professionals from across the pteg network to focus on specific policy areas and to share expertise and good practice. The PTEG Support Unit, based in Leeds, co-ordinated PTEG's activities and acted as a central point of contact.

PTEG became Urban Transport Group in 2018.

== Similar authorities ==
=== United Kingdom ===
A similar body, Transport for London, exists in Greater London. In shire county areas of England, similar functions are carried out by county councils.

==== Scotland ====
All of Scotland is now divided into Regional Transport Partnerships:

The seven RTPs are:

- Shetland Transport Partnership (ZetTrans)
- Highlands and Islands Transport Partnership (HITRANS)
- North-East of Scotland Transport Partnership (Nestrans)
- Tayside and Central Scotland Transport Partnership (Tactran)
- South-East of Scotland Transport Partnership (SEStran)
- Strathclyde Partnership for Transport (SPT)
- South-West of Scotland Transport Partnership (SWestrans)

=== Other countries ===
- Transit district is a similar type of organisation in the United States.
- In the Czech Republic, integrated public transport systems (Czech: integrovaný dopravní systém) have been set up by most regions to facilitate the unification of transport conditions and fare structure across various companies operating public transport in the region under a PSO contract.
- In Germany there are similar types of organisations for the big cities with surroundings, called Verkehrsverbund. They handle both bus and rail bound traffic.
- In Sweden there are similar types of organisations, called Trafikhuvudman (traffic responsible). Every county have to have at least one. All handle bus traffic and most also train traffic, and sometimes boat traffic. For some counties there are separate organisations for train traffic covering several counties.
- In Norway every county has the responsibility of organising local traffic. This is done through a department (9) or through companies (8) which might cover two counties. This always includes bus traffic, and often boat traffic. The actual vehicle operation is done by private companies through PSO contracts. Tram and metro traffic are operated by some cities, but are, ticket-wise, included in the county authority. Railway traffic is maintained by the Norwegian Railway Directorate, but are sometimes included in monthly passes sold by the county authority.
- In France regions or local authorities (communautés de communes, communautés d'agglomération, communautés urbaines or métropoles) are responsible for transportation as Autorités d'Organisation de la Mobilité.

== See also ==
- History of the PTE bus operations
