= Subdivisions of Scotland =

Present or former administrative subdivisions of Scotland

Council areas of Scotland
- Category: Administrative unit
- Location: Scotland
- Number: 32
- Populations: 21,920 (Orkney Islands) – 654,330 (Glasgow)
- Areas: 60 km^{2} (23 sq mi) (Dundee) – 25,653 km^{2} (9,905 sq mi) (Highland)
- Government: Council government
- Subdivisions: Community council areas

For local government purposes, Scotland is divided into 32 areas designated as "council areas" (Scottish Gaelic: comhairlean), which are all governed by single-tier authorities designated as "councils". They have the option under the Local Government (Gaelic Names) (Scotland) Act 1997 of being known (but not re-designated) as a "comhairle" when opting for a Gaelic name; only Comhairle nan Eilean Siar (Council of the Western Isles) has chosen this option, whereas the Highland Council (Comhairle na Gàidhealtachd) has adopted its Gaelic form alongside its English equivalent, informally.

The council areas have been in existence since 1 April 1996, under the provisions of the Local Government etc. (Scotland) Act 1994. Historically, Scotland was divided into 34 counties or shires. Although these no longer have any administrative function, they are still used to some extent in Scotland for cultural and geographical purposes, and some of the current council areas are named after them. There are also a number of other administrative divisions, some of which are handled by joint boards of the councils.

At the most local level, Scotland is divided into civil parishes, which are now used only for statistical purposes such as the census. The lowest level of administrative subdivision are the communities, which may elect community councils.

== History of the subdivisions of Scotland ==
Traditionally burghs have been the key unit of the local government of Scotland, being highly autonomous entities, with rights to representation in the old Parliament of Scotland. Even after the Acts of Union 1707, burghs continued to be the principal subdivision. Until 1889, administration was on a burgh and parish basis.

The years following 1889 saw the introduction of a hierarchy of local government administration comprising counties, counties of cities, large burghs and small burghs.

With effect from 16 May 1975 and until 31 March 1996 the local government divisions of Scotland consisted of an upper tier of regions each containing a lower tier of districts except for the single-tier island council areas. Since 1996 there has only been a single tier of government, and the former island council areas are of equal status to the other councils.

== Council areas ==
Council areas of Scotland
Coat of arms	Council area	Council	Land area		Population (2025)	Density		Administrative centre
Coat of arms	Council area	Council	(km^{2})	(mi^{2})	Population (2025)	(/km^{2})	(/mi^{2})	Administrative centre
	Aberdeen City	Aberdeen City Council	186	72	230,180	1,240	3,200	Aberdeen
	Aberdeenshire	Aberdeenshire Council	6,313	2,437	264,640	42	110	Aberdeen
	Angus	Angus Council	2,182	842	114,610	53	140	Forfar
	Argyll and Bute	Argyll and Bute Council	6,906	2,666	87,310	13	34	Lochgilphead
	Clackmannanshire	Clackmannanshire Council	159	61	51,610	324	840	Alloa
	Dumfries and Galloway	Dumfries and Galloway Council	6,426	2,481	145,490	23	60	Dumfries
	Dundee City	Dundee City Council	60	23	148,390	2,481	6,430	Dundee
	East Ayrshire	East Ayrshire Council	1,262	487	121,350	96	250	Kilmarnock
	East Dunbartonshire	East Dunbartonshire Council	174	67	109,550	628	1,630	Kirkintilloch
	East Lothian	East Lothian Council	679	262	116,460	171	440	Haddington
	East Renfrewshire	East Renfrewshire Council	174	67	99,840	573	1,480	Giffnock
	City of Edinburgh	City of Edinburgh Council	263	102	531,370	2,017	5,220	Edinburgh
	Falkirk	Falkirk Council	297	115	160,230	539	1,400	Falkirk
	Fife	Fife Council	1,325	512	373,990	282	730	Glenrothes
	Glasgow City	Glasgow City Council	175	68	654,330	3,747	9,700	Glasgow
	Highland	Highland Council	25,653	9,905	237,260	9	23	Inverness
	Inverclyde	Inverclyde Council	160	62	78,550	490	1,300	Greenock
	Midlothian	Midlothian Council	354	137	100,390	284	740	Dalkeith
	Moray	Moray Council	2,238	864	94,730	42	110	Elgin
	Na h-Eileanan Siar (Western Isles)	Comhairle nan Eilean Siar	3,056	1,180	25,770	8	21	Stornoway
	North Ayrshire	North Ayrshire Council	885	342	133,660	151	390	Irvine
	North Lanarkshire	North Lanarkshire Council	470	180	343,930	732	1,900	Motherwell
	Orkney	Orkney Islands Council	990	380	21,920	22	57	Kirkwall
	Perth and Kinross	Perth and Kinross Council	5,286	2,041	154,930	29	75	Perth
	Renfrewshire	Renfrewshire Council	261	101	189,270	724	1,880	Paisley
	Scottish Borders	Scottish Borders Council	4,732	1,827	116,800	25	65	Newtown St Boswells
	Shetland Islands	Shetland Islands Council	1,467	566	22,710	15	39	Lerwick
	South Ayrshire	South Ayrshire Council	1,222	472	112,280	92	240	Ayr
	South Lanarkshire	South Lanarkshire Council	1,772	684	334,330	189	490	Hamilton
	Stirling	Stirling Council	2,186	844	94,040	43	110	Stirling
	West Dunbartonshire	West Dunbartonshire Council	159	61	88,340	556	1,440	Dumbarton
	West Lothian	West Lothian Council	428	165	187,240	438	1,130	Livingston

== Other subdivisions ==
Scotland has several other administrative divisions, some of which are handled by joint boards of the councils.

=== Electoral and valuation ===
There are several joint boards for electoral registration and the purposes of property valuation for assessing council tax and rates.

Joint board area	Council areas
Ayrshire	East Ayrshire, North Ayrshire, South Ayrshire
Borders	Scottish Borders
Central Scotland	Clackmannanshire, Falkirk, Stirling
Dumfries and Galloway	Dumfries and Galloway
Dunbartonshire and Argyll & Bute	Argyll and Bute, East Dunbartonshire, West Dunbartonshire
Fife	Fife
Grampian	Aberdeen City, Aberdeenshire, Moray
Glasgow	Glasgow City
Highlands and Islands	Highland and Na h-Eileanan Siar (Western Isles)
Lanarkshire	North Lanarkshire, South Lanarkshire
Lothian	East Lothian, City of Edinburgh, Midlothian, West Lothian
Orkney and Shetland	Orkney Islands and Shetland Islands
Renfrewshire	East Renfrewshire, Inverclyde, Renfrewshire
Tayside	Angus, Dundee City, Perth and Kinross

=== Health ===
See also NHS Scotland

Health board area	Council areas
Ayrshire and Arran	East Ayrshire, North Ayrshire and South Ayrshire
Borders	Scottish Borders
Dumfries and Galloway	Dumfries and Galloway
Fife	Fife
Forth Valley	Clackmannanshire, Falkirk and Stirling
Grampian	Aberdeenshire, Aberdeen City and Moray
Greater Glasgow and Clyde	Glasgow City, East Dunbartonshire, East Renfrewshire, Inverclyde, Renfrewshire and West Dunbartonshire
Highland	Argyll and Bute and Highland
Lanarkshire	North Lanarkshire and South Lanarkshire
Lothian	City of Edinburgh, East Lothian, Midlothian and West Lothian
Orkney	Orkney Islands
Shetland	Shetland Islands
Tayside	Angus, Dundee City and Perth and Kinross
Western Isles (Eileanan Siar)	Western Isles (Na h-Eileanan Siar)

Until 1 April 2014 the towns of Cambuslang and Rutherglen were in the Greater Glasgow and Clyde health board area despite being located in South Lanarkshire. They are now part of NHS Lanarkshire.

=== Transport ===
The Scottish Government has created seven "Regional Transport Partnerships", for establishing transport policy in the regions. They broadly follow council area groupings.

Regional transport partnership	Council areas
Nestrans	Aberdeen, Aberdeenshire
TACTRAN	Angus, Dundee, Perth and Kinross, Stirling
HITRANS	Argyll and Bute (except Helensburgh and Lomond), Highland, Moray, Na h-Eileanan Siar (Western Isles), Orkney
ZetTrans	Shetland
SEStran	Edinburgh, Clackmannanshire, East Lothian, Falkirk, Midlothian, Fife, Scottish Borders, West Lothian
SWestrans	Dumfries and Galloway
SPT	Argyll and Bute (Helensburgh and Lomond only), West Dunbartonshire, East Dunbartonshire, North Lanarkshire, South Lanarkshire, Glasgow, East Renfrewshire, Renfrewshire, Inverclyde, South Ayrshire, East Ayrshire, North Ayrshire

=== Eurostat NUTS ===
In the Eurostat Nomenclature of Territorial Units for Statistics (NUTS), Scotland is a level-1 NUTS region, coded "UKM", which is subdivided as follows:

NUTS 1	Code	NUTS 2	Code	NUTS 3	Code
Scotland	UKM	Eastern Scotland	UKM2	Angus and Dundee	UKM21
		Eastern Scotland	UKM2	Clackmannanshire and Fife	UKM22
		Eastern Scotland	UKM2	East Lothian and Midlothian	UKM23
		Eastern Scotland	UKM2	Scottish Borders	UKM24
		Eastern Scotland	UKM2	Edinburgh	UKM25
		Eastern Scotland	UKM2	Falkirk	UKM26
		Eastern Scotland	UKM2	Perth and Kinross, and Stirling	UKM27
		Eastern Scotland	UKM2	West Lothian	UKM28
		South Western Scotland	UKM3	East Dunbartonshire, West Dunbartonshire, and Helensburgh and Lomond	UKM31
		South Western Scotland	UKM3	Dumfries and Galloway	UKM32
		South Western Scotland	UKM3	East and North Ayrshire mainland	UKM33
		South Western Scotland	UKM3	Glasgow	UKM34
		South Western Scotland	UKM3	Inverclyde, East Renfrewshire, and Renfrewshire	UKM35
		South Western Scotland	UKM3	North Lanarkshire	UKM36
		South Western Scotland	UKM3	South Ayrshire	UKM37
		South Western Scotland	UKM3	South Lanarkshire	UKM38
		North Eastern Scotland	UKM5	Aberdeen and Aberdeenshire	UKM50
		Highlands and Islands	UKM6	Caithness and Sutherland, and Ross and Cromarty	UKM61
		Highlands and Islands	UKM6	Inverness, Nairn, Moray, and Badenoch and Strathspey	UKM62
		Highlands and Islands	UKM6	Lochaber, Skye and Lochalsh, Arran and Cumbrae, and Argyll and Bute (except Helensburgh and Lomond)	UKM63
		Highlands and Islands	UKM6	Eilean Siar (Western Isles)	UKM64
		Highlands and Islands	UKM6	Orkney Islands	UKM65
		Highlands and Islands	UKM6	Shetland Islands	UKM66

=== Land registration ===
The current land registration system in Scotland divides Scotland into 33 Registration Counties, each coming into effect on various dates between 1981 and 2003. These areas in most cases resemble those of the pre-1975 administrative counties with Glasgow being the only current city to form a registration county.

Registration county	Operational from
County of Renfrew	6 April 1981
County of Dunbarton	4 October 1982
County of Lanark	3 January 1984
County of the Barony and Regality of Glasgow	30 September 1985
County of Clackmannan	1 October 1992
County of Stirling	1 April 1993
County of West Lothian	1 October 1993
County of Fife	1 April 1995
County of Aberdeen	1 April 1996
County of Kincardine	1 April 1996
County of Ayr	1 April 1997
County of Dumfries	1 April 1997
County of Kirkcudbright	1 April 1997
County of Wigtown	1 April 1997
County of Angus	1 April 1999
County of Kinross	1 April 1999
County of Perth	1 April 1999
County of Berwick	1 October 1999
County of East Lothian	1 October 1999
County of Peebles	1 October 1999
County of Roxburgh	1 October 1999
County of Selkirk	1 October 1999
County of Argyll	1 April 2000
County of Bute	1 April 2000
County of Midlothian	1 April 2001
County of Inverness	1 April 2002
County of Nairn	1 April 2002
County of Banff	1 April 2003
County of Caithness	1 April 2003
County of Moray	1 April 2003
Counties of Orkney and Zetland	1 April 2003
County of Ross and Cromarty	1 April 2003
County of Sutherland	1 April 2003

=== Sheriffdoms ===
Sheriffdoms are judicial areas. Since 1 January 1975, these have been six in number:

- Glasgow and Strathkelvin
- Grampian, Highland and Islands
- Lothian and Borders
- North Strathclyde
- South Strathclyde, Dumfries and Galloway
- Tayside, Central and Fife

=== Lieutenancy areas ===
The Lieutenancy areas of Scotland are the areas used for the ceremonial lord-lieutenants, the monarch's representatives. The areas are similar to the Historic Counties and the Registration Counties, but are not identical to either. Most notably, the four cities of Aberdeen, Dundee, Edinburgh, and Glasgow form separate areas from the surrounding countryside, with the Lord Provost of each city acting ex officio as the lord-lieutenant.

Lieutenancy areas of Scotland
1. Aberdeen; 2. Aberdeenshire; 3. Angus; 4. Argyll and Bute; 5. Ayrshire and Arran; 6. Banffshire; 7. Berwickshire; 8. Caithness; 9. Clackmannanshire; 10. Dumfries; 11. Dunbartonshire; 12. Dundee; 13. East Lothian; 14. Edinburgh; 15. Fife; 16. Glasgow; 17. Inverness; 18. Kincardineshire; 19. Lanarkshire; 20. Midlothian; 21. Moray; 22. Nairn; 23. Perth and Kinross; 24. Renfrewshire; 25. Ross and Cromarty; 26. Roxburgh, Ettrick and Lauderdale; 27. Stirling and Falkirk; 28. Sutherland; 29. The Stewartry of Kirkcudbright; 30. Tweeddale; 31. West Lothian; 32. Western Isles; 33. Wigtown; Not shown: Orkney; Shetland

=== Former police and fire services ===
The Police and Fire Reform (Scotland) Act 2012 resulted in the merger of local police and fire services on 1 April 2013 to form the Police Service of Scotland (Scottish Gaelic: Seirbheis Phoilis na h-Alba) and the Scottish Fire and Rescue Service (SFRS, Scottish Gaelic: Seirbheis Smàlaidh agus Teasairginn na h-Alba).

Prior to 1975 policing was the responsibility of the Cities and Burghs of Scotland (see List of burghs in Scotland). Between 1975 and 2013 Scotland was subdivided into Police and fire service areas based on the regions and districts and island council areas that were also formed in 1975. The police and fire service regions used between 1975 and 2013 are listed below.

Services	Original area (former regions)	Council areas	Police Scotland Division
Central Scotland Police; Central Scotland Fire and Rescue Service	Central	Clackmannanshire, Falkirk and Stirling	Forth Valley (C Division)
Dumfries and Galloway Constabulary; Dumfries and Galloway Fire and Rescue Service	Dumfries and Galloway	Dumfries and Galloway	Dumfries & Galloway (V Division)
Fife Constabulary; Fife Fire and Rescue Service	Fife	Fife	Fife (P Division)
Grampian Police; Grampian Fire and Rescue Service	Grampian	Aberdeen City, Aberdeenshire and Moray	Aberdeenshire (A Division)
Lothian and Borders Police; Lothian and Borders Fire and Rescue Service	Lothians and the Scottish Borders	City of Edinburgh, East Lothian, Midlothian, Scottish Borders, West Lothian	Lothian & Borders (J Division) Edinburgh City (E Division)
Northern Constabulary; Highlands and Islands Fire and Rescue Service	Highland, Orkney, Shetland and Western Isles	Highland, Na h-Eileanan Siar (Western Isles), Orkney and Shetland	Highland & Islands (N Division)
Strathclyde Police; Strathclyde Fire and Rescue	Strathclyde	Argyll and Bute, East Ayrshire, East Dunbartonshire; East Renfrewshire, Glasgow City, Inverclyde, North Ayrshire, North Lanarkshire, Renfrewshire, South Ayrshire, South Lanarkshire and West Dunbartonshire	Argyll & West Dunbartonshire (L Division) Renfrewshire & Inverclyde (K Division) Ayrshire (U Division) Greater Glasgow (G Division) Lanarkshire (Q Division)
Tayside Police; Tayside Fire and Rescue Service	Tayside	Angus, Dundee City and Perth & Kinross	Tayside (D Division)

== Lower level subdivisions ==
Scotland is divided into 871 civil parishes which often resemble same-named but legally different ecclesiastical parishes. Although they have had no administrative function since 1930, they still exist and are still used for statistical purposes such as the census. Many former civil parish areas also continued to form registration districts until 1 January 2007. Many boundary changes have occurred over the years and an area currently derived from an old parish might no longer contain a place previously within that parish. Similarly, county boundaries (as still used for land registration) have also changed over the years such that a parish mentioned historically (generally before the 1860s) as being in one county (or sometimes two due to straddling a border) might now be in a neighbouring county and consequentially in a different succeeding council area.

For most administrative purposes, the base level of sub-division in Scotland is now that of communities, which may elect community councils. The main role of these bodies is to channel and reflect local opinion to other bodies; they otherwise have very limited powers. There are around 1,200 communities in Scotland. Not all communities have councils; some have joint councils.

Scottish communities are the nearest equivalent to civil parishes in England.

== See also ==
- List of local governments in the United Kingdom
- ISO 3166-2:GB, subdivision codes for the United Kingdom
- Scottish Parliament constituencies and electoral regions
- Scottish Westminster constituencies
