= Highlands and Islands =

Area of Scotland

The Highlands and Islands region. Some Highland districts are not shown.

The Highlands and Islands is an area of Scotland broadly covering the Scottish Highlands, plus Orkney, Shetland, and the Hebrides (Western Isles).

The Highlands and Islands are sometimes defined as the area to which the Crofters Holdings (Scotland) Act 1886 applied. This area consisted of eight counties of Scotland:

- Argyll
- Caithness
- Inverness-shire
- Nairn
- Orkney
- Ross and Cromarty
- Shetland
- Sutherland

Highlands and Islands Enterprise (HIE) uses a broader definition also used at Eurostat's NUTS level 2, and there has been a Highlands and Islands electoral region of the Scottish Parliament since 1999.

== Society and economy ==
The area underwent significant depopulation in the 18th and 19th centuries. This was reversed in the 21st century, particularly around Inverness. In 2019 the Scottish Government committed to increasing the population of the area to align with economic opportunities such as renewable energy.

A 2018 estimate of the population was 469,365, an increase of 0.5% from 2011. A higher than average percentage were self-employed compared to Scotland (11.0% compared to 8.7%). The unemployment rate was lower than in Scotland in general, 2.3% vs. 3.2%, and the employment rate was higher at 78.6% vs. 74.7%.

The restrictions required by the worldwide pandemic increased unemployment in the Highlands and Islands in summer 2020 to 5.7%; that was significantly higher than the 2.4% in 2019. The rates were said to be highest in "Lochaber, Skye and Wester Ross and Argyll and the Islands". A December 2020 report stated that between March (just before the effects of pandemic were noted) and December, the unemployment rate increased by "more than 97%" and suggested that the outlook was even worse for spring 2021.

== Public services ==
In Highlands and Islands Fire and Rescue Service the name refers to the local government areas (council areas) of Highland, Orkney, Shetland and the Western Isles. The former Northern Constabulary covered the area. As of early 2021, Police Scotland operated six Command Areas in the Highlands and Islands: North Highland, Inverness, South Highland, Orkney Islands, Shetland Islands and Western Isles. Each had a Local Area Commander and a Chief Inspector. The police service works in partnership with Highland Council, Shetland, Orkney and Western Isles Councils.

The HITRANS (Highlands and Islands Partnership for Transport), established in 2006, covers most of the council areas of Argyll and Bute, Highland, Moray, Orkney and the Western Isles. Shetland is covered by the separate ZetTrans. Helensburgh and Lomond is covered by Strathclyde Partnership for Transport.

The Scottish Government established the Convention of the Highlands and Islands to enable dialogue with the local authorities and other organisations such as the NHS.

== Politics ==
Highlands and Islands is an electoral region of the Scottish Parliament. In the 2007 election, this region was the last to declare its regional votes, which were the decisive results in determining that the Scottish National Party overtook Scottish Labour to obtain the largest representation in the Scottish Parliament by one seat.

As of 2024, the MPs representing the Highlands and Islands areas are Alistair Carmichael (Orkney and Shetland), Angus Macdonald (Inverness, Skye, and West Ross-shire), and Jamie Stone (Caithness, Sutherland, and Easter Ross) all of whom are Scottish Liberal Democrats. In addition, Torcuil Crichton is the Labour MP for Na h-Eileanan an Iar; Graham Leadbitter the SNP MP for Moray West, Nairn, and Strathspey; and Brendan O'Hara the SNP MP for Argyll and Bute.

== See also ==
- Central Belt
- Scottish Lowlands
