= Transport Scotland =

National transport agency of Scotland

- Còmhdhail Alba

Executive agency overview
- Formed: 1 January 2006
- Jurisdiction: Scotland
- Headquarters: Bothwell Street, Glasgow
- Employees: 400
- Annual budget: £3.58 billion (2023–2024)
- Minister responsible: Stephen Flynn MSP, Cabinet Secretary for Economy, Tourism and Transport
- Executive agency executive: Alison Irvine, chief executive
- Website: www.transport.gov.scot

Transport Scotland (Scottish Gaelic: Còmhdhail Alba) is the national transport agency of Scotland. It was established by the Transport (Scotland) Act 2005, and began operating on 1 January 2006 as an executive agency of the Scottish Government.

An executive agency of the Scottish government, it manages transport projects, ScotRail, and all motorways and major A-class roads in Scotland. The agency is organised into eight directorates, including Aviation, Maritime, Freight and Canals; Bus, Accessibility & Active Travel; and Rail. Transport Scotland also contributes to the Scottish Government's Climate Change plan.

Regional transport partnerships (RTPs) help plan and deliver regional transport developments, with each RTP preparing a regional transport strategy and delivery plan. Some RTPs also provide transport services, like the Strathclyde Partnership for Transport which operates the Glasgow Subway and major bus stations.

== Organisation ==
Transport Scotland is an executive agency of the Scottish government that conducts transport projects, manages ScotRail, and also maintains all motorways and major A-class roads in Scotland.

=== Directorates ===
The agency is made up of eight directorates:

- Aviation, Maritime, Freight and Canals
- Bus, Accessibility & Active Travel
- Finance and Corporate Services
- Low Carbon Economy
- Major Projects
- Rail
- Roads
- Strategy & Analysis

Transport Scotland has a responsibility to improve the sustainability and accessibility of local transport options including getting people back using bus transport. It has a role in promoting walking, cycling and public transport.

Through Scottish Rail Holdings, its operator of last resort, Transport Scotland has taken ScotRail and the Caledonian Sleeper back into public ownership.

Transport contributes to the Scottish Government Climate Change plan (updated in December 2020).

== Current strategic documents ==
A second National Transport Strategy for Scotland was published in February 2020. Its vision for the next 20 years is underpinned by four priorities: reducing inequalities, taking climate action, helping deliver inclusive economic growth and improving health and well-being. There are three associated outcomes for each priority.

== Traffic Scotland ==
The focus of Traffic Scotland is to minimise the effects of congestion, breakdowns and unforeseen events on the trunk road network. Traffic Scotland delivers traveller information for the Scottish trunk road network through a process called 'monitor, control and inform'.

- Monitor: monitors the network using CCTV, roadside hardware, communication with the police, weather forecasts and major event management services.
- Control: all information collected through the monitoring process is processed within the Traffic Scotland Control Centre. The Traffic Scotland Control Centre operates 24 hours a day to ensure that traffic and travel information disseminated as part of the Traffic Scotland service is accurate.
- Inform: traffic and travel information processed by the Traffic Scotland Control Centre is then disseminated via the Traffic Scotland service, including the Traffic Scotland website, the Traffic Customer Care Line, road side Variable Message Signs (VMS) and via the multiple Traffic Scotland data services available to public, corporate and media users.

In November 2016, Traffic Scotland introduced a real-time service to allow drivers to track which roads had been gritted through the 'Trunk Road Gritter Tracker'.

== Regional transport partnerships ==
The role of regional transport partnerships (RTPs) is to strengthen the planning and delivery of regional transport developments, with the first task of each RTP being to prepare a regional transport strategy. This is supported by a delivery plan where RTPs set out when and how projects and proposals will be delivered.

Some RTPs are also responsible for the delivery of transport services. For example, the Strathclyde Partnership for Transport owns and operates the Glasgow subway and major bus stations across the west of Scotland.

The seven RTPs are:

- Shetland Transport Partnership (ZetTrans)
- Highlands and Islands Transport Partnership (HITRANS)
- North-East of Scotland Transport Partnership (Nestrans)
- Tayside and Central Scotland Transport Partnership (Tactran)
- South-East of Scotland Transport Partnership (SEStran)
- Strathclyde Partnership for Transport (SPT)
- South-West of Scotland Transport Partnership (SWestrans)

== See also ==
- Transport in Scotland
