= Edinburgh bus station =

Bus station in Edinburgh, Scotland

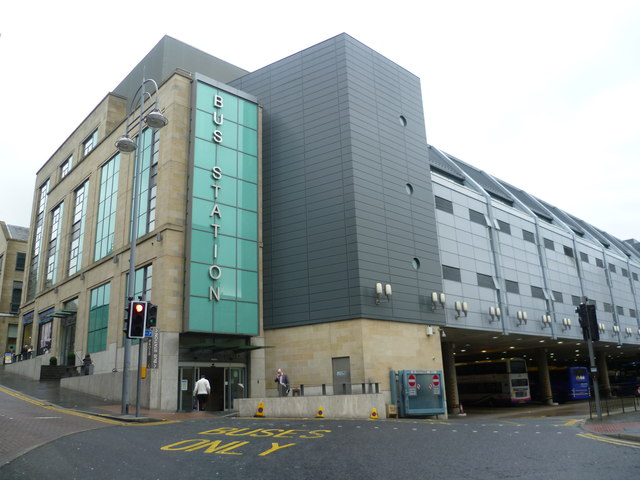

General information
- Location: Elder Street, Edinburgh; Scotland
- Coordinates: 55.9555°N 3.1917°W
- Owner: Coal Pension Properties
- Operator: City of Edinburgh Council
- Bus stands: 18
- Bus operators: Borders Buses; FlixBus; National Express; Scottish Citylink; Houston's Coaches; Stagecoach South Scotland; Parks of Hamilton
- Connections: Edinburgh Waverley (200 metres); St Andrew Square; Picardy Place

Other information
- Website: City of Edinburgh

History
- Opened: April 1957
Location
- Location within Edinburgh city centre

Edinburgh bus station is a central bus station in the city centre of Edinburgh.

The bus station is situated on Elder Street, where the buses enter & exit, with pedestrian access from there and St Andrew Square.

The current building and forecourt was completed in 2003, as part of a larger city centre redevelopment to accommodate a prestigious department store and attract other high-end retailers. The design was by Edinburgh architects CDA Group.

== History ==
St Andrew Square bus station was opened in April 1957 by Scottish Motor Traction, with 16 stances over five platforms and underground subways connecting the platforms. By the late 1960s, an office block had been built above the station where its building supports ate into the platforms considerably reducing the available space.

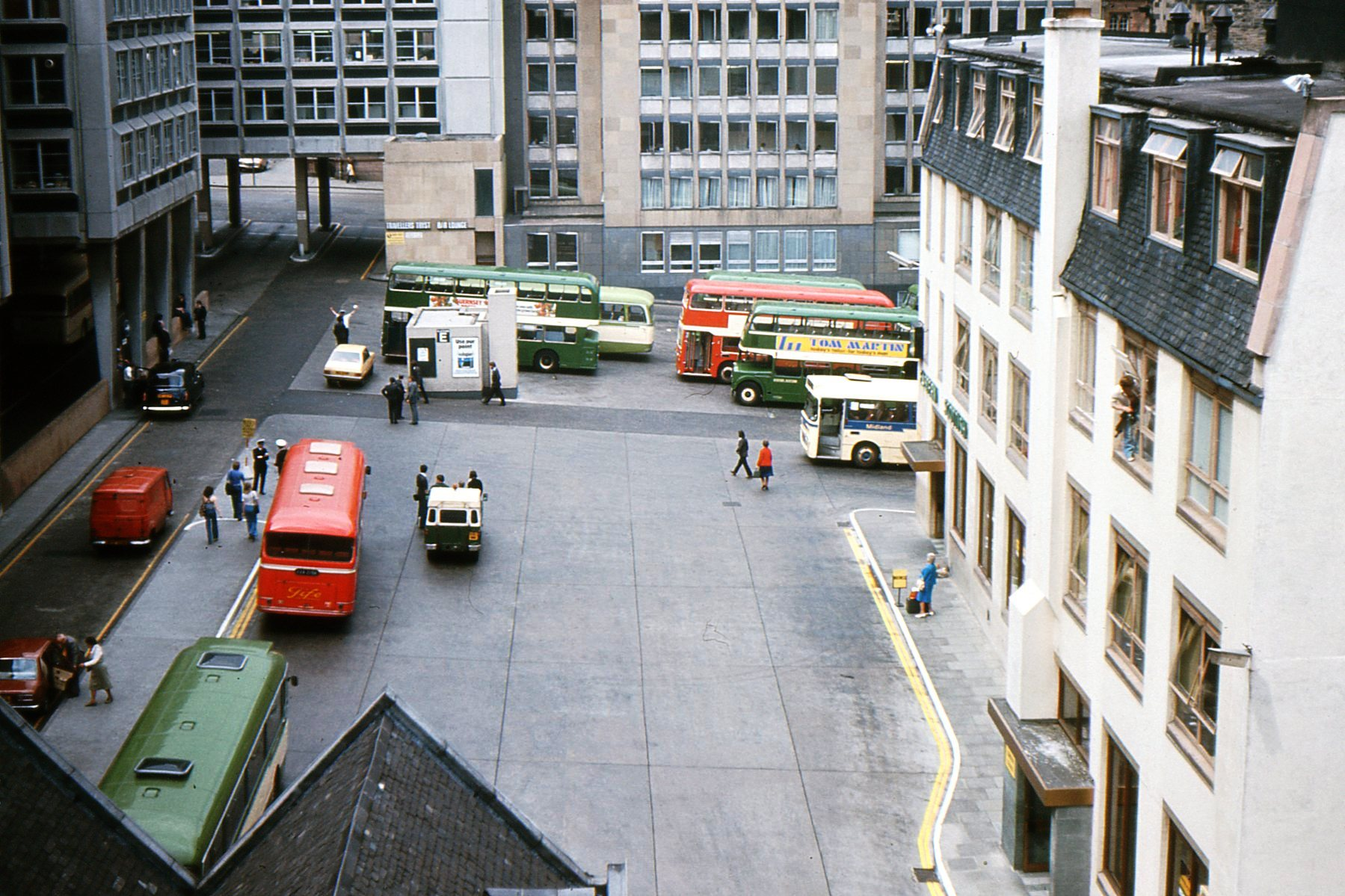
St Andrew's Square bus station in the 1970s. The stances below the office block can be seen to the left of the picture.

The station closed on 2 July 2000 for development to commence on a modern replacement bus station, a pedestrianised shopping precinct and Scotland's first Harvey Nichols store.

During its reconstruction, a number of issues appeared. Several bus operators complained that the departure fees were too high and planned not to transfer services back into the bus station. Plans were considered that would have moved the bus station within four years to a new redevelopment at Waverley. In a report to councilors, the director of city development, Andrew Holmes, said: "With the delivery of this project now a firm prospect in the next few years, there are potentially opportunities for accommodating integrated facilities for strategic bus services".

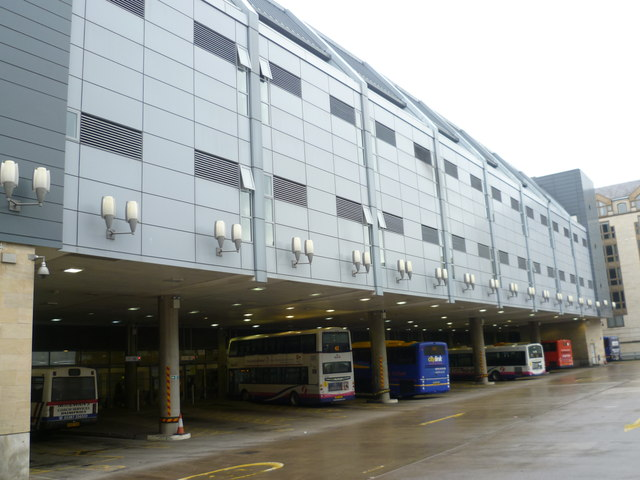
Bus Station bays in 2012

The new bus station opened in February 2003, four months late. It was built and is owned by Coal Pension Properties and is leased by the City of Edinburgh Council.

Since the station reopened, major issues have repeatedly arisen. Within days of its opening, bus drivers were complaining that the ramp into the station was too steep and was catching the bottom of their vehicles. That problem was resolved within a week, with minor changes were made to the ramp.

In 2003, faulty ceiling tiles had to be replaced to ensure that they did not fall onto passers-by.

In 2007, roof planes shut the bus station after they become detached from the roof, which reoccurred with high winds in May 2011. Also in 2007, the offices above the station were flooded, which resulted in the ceiling collapsing and so needing extra support for nearly three years.

In 2011, the City of Edinburgh Council took Balfour Beatty to court over their claims of poor workmanship in connection to the bus station because of emergency work that needed to be carried out. One city council source said: "A new facility like this should have been much sturdier, even in bad weather.... The council only leases the bus station, but has had to pay to carry out repairs to ensure it is safe enough to open up for passengers. The final designs and work have simply not been up to scratch".

Coal Pension Properties initially had no plans to renew the lease on the bus station, with plans for the site to be redeveloped for residential use after the lease expired in 2027. However, the City of Edinburgh Council negotiated a new deal with Coal Pension Properties in February 2025 to renew the lease, saving the bus station from potential closure.

== Services ==
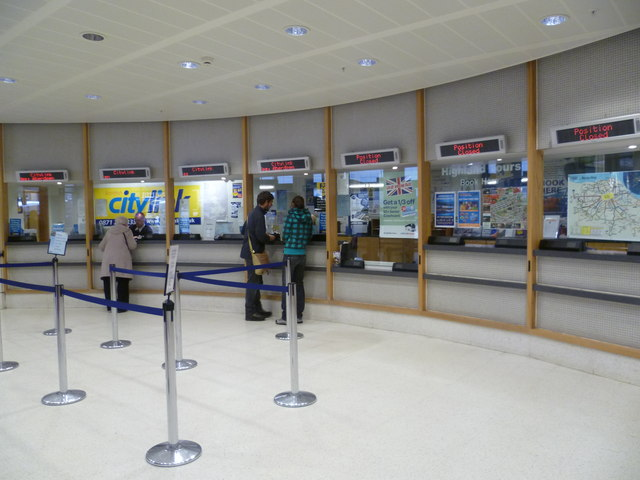
Ticket desks

Buses and coaches connect Glasgow, Perth, Dundee, Aberdeen, Fife, Scottish Borders, Dumfries & Galloway and Berwick-upon-Tweed.

FlixBus and National Express connect to farther destinations, mainly in England and Wales.

The bus station also has connection to the Edinburgh Trams. The closest stop is St Andrew Square situated at the west exit, or Picardy Place is a short walk east from the Elder Street exit onto York Place.
