= History of local government in the United Kingdom =

The history of local government in the United Kingdom covers the development of local government in the United Kingdom since its formation in 1707. Each of the four countries of the United Kingdom has a separate system of local government with origins that predate the UK itself. Little changed until the 19th century after which each system experienced a constant evolution of organisation and function. Following devolution at the end of the 20th century, the Scottish Parliament exercises power over local government in Scotland, the Northern Ireland Assembly exercises power over local government in Northern Ireland, the Welsh Parliament (formerly the Welsh Assembly) exercises power over local government in Wales and the UK Parliament continues to exercise power over local government in England.

For details of the history of local government in each country, see:

- History of local government in England
- History of local government in Northern Ireland
- History of local government in Scotland
- History of local government in Wales

== See also ==
- List of local governments in the United Kingdom
