= Dunbarton =

Dunbarton is an alternative spelling of Dumbarton, a town in Scotland.

Dunbarton may also refer to:

== Places ==
=== Canada ===
- Dunbarton, a community of Pickering, Ontario

=== Scotland ===
- Dunbartonshire, a county
- Dunbartonshire (UK Parliament constituency)
- Dunbartonshire and Argyll & Bute, an administrative division

=== United States ===
- Dunbarton, New Hampshire
- Dunbarton, South Carolina
- Dunbarton, Wisconsin

== Educational institutions ==
- Dunbarton College of the Holy Cross, former college in Washington, D.C., United States
- Dunbarton High School, Pickering, Ontario, Canada

== See also ==
- Dumbarton (disambiguation)
