= UTG (disambiguation) =

UTG may refer to:

- United Tasmania Group, the world's first Green party to contest elections
- Quthing Airport, the IATA code UTG
- Urban Transport Group, a British transport organisation created in 2016
- University of the Gambia, an institution of higher education located in Sere Kunda
- Underneath the Gun, a Christian deathcore and metalcore band from Corona, California
- Union Terrace Gardens, public park and gardens in Aberdeen, Scotland
