= List of local governments in the United Kingdom =

This is a list of articles relating to present and past types of local government in the United Kingdom.

== By country ==
England	Local government	History	Subdivisions
Scotland	Local government	History	Subdivisions
Wales	Local government	History	Subdivisions
Northern Ireland	Local government		

== By sub-division ==
=== Administration ===
Country	Regional/strategic government	Local government		Parish
Country	Regional/strategic government	Upper tier	Lower tier	Parish
England	Strategic authority area (some areas)	Unitary authority district		Civil parish Parish council (most areas)
England	Strategic authority area (some areas)	Non-metropolitan county	Non-metropolitan district	Civil parish Parish council (most areas)
Scotland	None	Council areas		Community council
Wales	Corporate Joint Committees (Regions)	Principal areas		Community; Community council
Northern Ireland	None	Districts		

=== Ceremonial ===
Country	Lieutenancy area
England	Ceremonial counties
Scotland	Lieutenancy areas
Wales	Preserved counties
Northern Ireland	Counties

=== Related concepts ===
- Area committee
- County
- County council
- Local enterprise partnership
- ONS coding system
- Overview and Scrutiny
- Passenger transport executive
- Police authority
- Police [fire] and crime commissioner
- Regional assembly (England) (defunct by 2010)
- Township (England)
- Waste disposal authorities in London

== Lists ==
Type	UK parts	England ceremonial counties	England districts	England non-met counties	Wales principal areas
general				list	
by area	list	list	list	list	list
by population	list	list	list	list	list
by population density	list		list		

- International Territorial Level (replaced NUTS in 2021)
  - ITL 1 statistical regions of England
- List of counties of the United Kingdom
- List of civil parishes in England
- List of English districts by ethnicity
- List of rural and urban districts in England in 1973
- List of Welsh areas by percentage of Welsh-speakers
- List of communities in Wales
- List of rural and urban districts in Wales in 1973
- List of burghs in Scotland

== Historical ==
Country	1890s–1970s		1970s–1990s	
Country	Upper tier	Lower tier	Upper tier	Lower tier
England	Administrative counties and County boroughs	Metropolitan borough Municipal borough Urban district Rural district	Counties	Districts
Wales	Administrative counties and County boroughs	Metropolitan borough Municipal borough Urban district Rural district	Counties	Districts
Ireland / Northern Ireland	Counties and County boroughs	Metropolitan borough Municipal borough Urban district Rural district	Districts	
Scotland	Counties and Counties of cities	large burghs and small burghs	Regions	Districts

- 1990s UK local government reform
- Administrative county
- Association of British Counties (pressure group)
- County corporate
- Local board of health
- Police burgh
- Poor law union
- Registration district
- Registration county
- Sanitary district

== Legislation, reports and papers ==
- Municipal Corporations Act 1835
- Metropolis Management Act 1855
- Local Government Act 1858
- Local Government Act 1888
- Local Government (Scotland) Act 1889
- Local Government Act 1894
- Local Government (Ireland) Act 1898
- London Government Act 1899
- Local Government Act 1929
- London Government Act 1963
- Redcliffe-Maud Report (1969)
- Local Government Act 1972
- Streamlining the cities (1983)
- Local Government Act 1985
- Local Government Act 1988
- Local Government etc. (Scotland) Act 1994
- Local Government (Wales) Act 1994
- Greater London Authority Act 1999
- Local Government Act 2000 (applies to England and Wales only)
- Regional Assemblies (Preparations) Act 2003 (applies to England only)
- Local Governance (Scotland) Act 2004

== See also ==
- Administrative geography of the United Kingdom
- Political make-up of local councils in the United Kingdom
