= 101/102 Edinburgh–Dumfries =

Bus routes in Scotland

Routes 101 and 102 are bus routes that operate between Edinburgh and Dumfries. The route is run by Houston’s Coaches.

== History ==
In 2018, the bus route was operated at a cost of £390,000 per year and was used by over 185,000 people per year. The cost was covered by SWESTRANS, Strathclyde Partnership for Transport, the Scottish Borders Council, and the Midlothian Council. The route was threatened with cutbacks or withdrawal when Midlothian Council announced in May 2018 that it would withdraw its funding of £135,000. In July 2018 the council announced that the route would be retained after it reached an agreement to reduce its yearly contribution to £35,000. As a result, evening services on the routes were withdrawn.

In January 2020, complaints were made against Stagecoach about the reliability of the route.

In July 2022, the route was once again threatened with withdrawal. The costs of operating the route had increased by 86% since the previous contract was awarded in 2018. The route was set to be withdrawn in August 2022. Later that month, the council announced that the route would be retained until March 2023. In December 2022 it was announced that the route had been tendered but no suitable long term operator had been found.

In February 2023, it was announced that the route would be taken over by Houstons Coaches but that two return journeys would no longer run. The service will now have ten return journeys between Edinburgh and Biggar with four continuing to Dumfries. On Sundays, four return journeys will run.
