= Dundee Crossrail =

Overview
- Status: proposed
- Owner: National Rail
- Locale: Dundee; Scotland

Technical
- Track gauge: 4 ft 8 1/2 in (1,435 mm)

Dundee Crossrail is a proposed railway development in north-east Scotland, first proposed within the 2003 Scottish Strategic Rail Study. It is supported by Tactran, Tayside's statutory regional transport partnership.

The proposed service was for a half-hourly service from Arbroath to Perth and for a similar frequency for trains from Dundee to St. Andrews.
