= Local government in the United Kingdom =

System of state administration on a local level in Great Britain and Northern Ireland

Local government in the United Kingdom has origins which pre-date the United Kingdom itself, as each of the four countries of the United Kingdom has its own separate system. For an overview, see Administrative geography of the United Kingdom. For details, see:

- Local government in England
- Local government in Northern Ireland
- Local government in Scotland
- Local government in Wales

For the history of local government in each country, see:

- History of local government in England
- History of local government in Northern Ireland
- History of local government in Scotland
- History of local government in Wales

For local government entities in each country, see

- Category:Local authorities of England
- Category:Local authorities of Northern Ireland
- Category:Local authorities of Scotland
- Category:Local authorities of Wales

== See also ==
- List of local governments in the United Kingdom
- Political make-up of local councils in the United Kingdom
