= Urban Transport Group =

British transport organisation

- Abbreviation: UTG
- Registration no.: Company 05491588
- Legal status: Active
- Location: 40-50 Wellington Street, Leeds, West Yorkshire
- Director: Jason Prince
- Chair: Richard McGuckin
- Website: urbantransportgroup.org
- Formerly called: Passenger Transport Executive Group

The Urban Transport Group (UTG) is an umbrella body of transport authorities in the United Kingdom.

== History ==
The Passenger Transport Executive Group (PTEG) was an umbrella body, to promote the collective interests of the passenger transport executives that cover the major conurbations of Great Britain.

In 2003, PTEG increased its capacity by opening a support unit in the offices of West Yorkshire Metro.

Transport for London became a full member in December 2015. PTEG was renamed Urban Transport Group in January 2016.

== Membership ==
As of November 2025, UTG has ten principal members:

- East Midlands Combined County Authority
- Liverpool City Region Combined Authority
- Nexus
- South Yorkshire Mayoral Combined Authority
- Transport for Greater Manchester
- Transport for London
- Transport for Wales
- Transport for West Midlands
- West of England Combined Authority
- West Yorkshire Combined Authority

As of June 2026, there are a further nine members (giving a total of nineteen):

- Cambridgeshire and Peterborough Combined Authority
- Cheshire and Warrington Combined Authority
- Leicester City Council
- Oxfordshire County Council
- Portsmouth City Council
- Strathclyde Partnership for Transport
- Tees Valley Combined Authority
- Translink
- York and North Yorkshire Combined Authority
