= Districts of England =

Local government sub-divisions of England

Local authority district
- Category: Administrative district
- Location: England
- Found in: Counties
- Created by: Local Government Act 1972; London Government Act 1963
- Created: mostly 1 April 1974; and 1 April 1965; some earlier (see text)
- Number: 296 (as of 2025)
- Possible types: Unitary authority area (132) ∟ London borough (32) ∟ Metropolitan district (36) ∟ Non-metropolitan district (62) ∟ Other (2); Two-tier Non-metropolitan district (164)
- Possible status: City; Royal borough; Borough
- Populations: 2,300 – 1.1 million
- Areas: 3 – 5,013 km^{2} (1 – 1,936 sq mi)

The districts of England are a level of subnational division of England used for the purposes of local government. They are officially categorised by the Office for National Statistics as "local authority districts" (LADs). Although the City of London Corporation and the Council of the Isles of Scilly are sui generis local authorities, the Office for National Statistics officially categorises both the City of London and the Isles of Scilly as LADs for statistical purposes. With the exception of those two authorities, every district in England is classified as either a London borough, a metropolitan district, or a non-metropolitan district.

The two types of district in England are 132 unitary authorities (in which a single council provides all local government services) and 164 two-tier districts (in which a district council shares responsibility for providing local government services with a county council). Some English districts have been granted the status of city, royal borough, or borough; these are purely honorific titles and do not alter the powers of their councils.

All city, royal borough, and borough councils are chaired by a mayor who in most cases is a ceremonial figure elected from amongst the district councillors. As of June 2026, 13 districts also have a directly elected local authority mayor who acts as the leader of the council and makes most policy decisions, supported by a cabinet that they choose from amongst the district councillors.

== History ==
Before the establishment of districts in the 1890s, the basic unit of local government in England was the parish, overseen by the parish church vestry committee. Vestries dealt with the administration of both parochial and secular governmental matters. Parishes were the successors of the manorial system and historically had been grouped into hundreds, which had exercised some supervising administrative function. However, these powers ebbed away as more and more civic and judicial powers were centred on county towns. From 1834 these parishes were grouped into Poor Law Unions, creating areas for administration of the Poor Law. These areas were later used for census registration and as the basis for sanitary provision. In 1894, based on these earlier subdivisions, the Local Government Act 1894 created urban districts and rural districts as sub-divisions of administrative counties, which had been created in 1889. At the same time, parish-level local government administration was transferred to civil parishes. Another reform in 1900 created 28 metropolitan boroughs as sub-divisions of the County of London.

The setting-down of the current structure of districts in England began in 1965, when Greater London and its 32 London boroughs were created. They are the oldest type of district still in use. In 1974, metropolitan counties and non-metropolitan counties (also known as "shire counties") were created across the rest of England and were split into metropolitan districts and non-metropolitan districts.

The powers and responsibilities of the London boroughs and metropolitan districts changed in 1986, when they absorbed the functions and some of the powers of the metropolitan county councils and the Greater London Council, which were abolished. Since 2000, powers are again shared (on a different basis) with the Greater London Authority.

During the 1990s a further kind of district was created, the non-metropolitan unitary authority, which combined the powers, functions, and responsibilities of a county and a district.

== Unitary authorities ==
There are five classifications of unitary authority in England: London boroughs, metropolitan districts, unitary non-metropolitan districts, the City of London Corporation, and the Council of the Isles of Scilly. All are commonly referred to as simply "unitary authorities".

=== London boroughs ===
The 32 London boroughs are sub-divisions of Greater London. They were established in 1965. Between 1965 and 1986 a two-tier structure of local government existed in Greater London and the boroughs, along with the City of London, shared power with the Greater London Council (GLC). When the GLC was abolished in 1986 these became unitary authorities. In 2000, the Greater London Authority (GLA) was established which was granted some powers and responsibilities previously exercised by the London local authorities. Unlike the GLC, the GLA was established as a strategic regional authority, rather than a local authority.

Each London borough is responsible for many of the services within their area, such as schools, waste management, planning applications, social services, libraries and others.

=== Metropolitan districts ===
Metropolitan boroughs are a subdivision of a metropolitan county. These became unitary authorities, as the metropolitan county councils were abolished in 1986. Most of the powers of the county councils were devolved to the districts but some services are run by joint boards and organisations. The districts typically have populations of 174,000 to 1.1 million.

=== Unitary non-metropolitan districts ===
All but six of the 62 unitary non-metropolitan districts are also simultaneously classified as non-metropolitan counties. They were first created in the mid-1990s, and often cover large towns and cities as this is deemed more efficient than a two-tier structure. In addition, some of the smaller counties such as Rutland, Herefordshire and the Isle of Wight are unitary authorities. The latest ones were introduced in 2023.

The six unitary non-metropolitan districts in Berkshire are not classified as non-metropolitan counties because the Royal county of Berkshire itself retained its classification as a non-metropolitan county, albeit one with no county council or administrative functions.

== Two-tier districts ==
Two-tier districts are English local authorities which share powers, functions, and responsibilities with a two-tier county. Since 1986, all remaining two-tier districts have been non-metropolitan districts.

Two-tier non-metropolitan districts are subdivisions of two-tier non-metropolitan counties (also known as "shire counties"). These districts typically have populations of 25,000 to 200,000. In this two-tier system, county councils are responsible for some local services, such as education, social services, and roads, while district councils run other services, such as waste collection, local planning, and council housing.

The number of two-tier districts in England has been declining since the creation of many unitary authorities in the 1990s. As of June 2026, there are 164 remaining two-tier districts in England. All of these are expected to be phased out as part of the upcoming structural changes to local government in England. The government intends to move to an entirely unitary pattern of local government across England.

== Districts with their ceremonial or historic county in their names ==
UA = unitary authority NM = non-metropolitan district in a two-tier county
District		County	
Name	Type	Ceremonial	Historic
Cumberland	UA	X mark	(Cumberland)
Northumberland	UA	check	check
Westmorland and Furness	UA	X mark	(Westmorland)
County Durham	UA	(County Durham)	check
West Lancashire	NM	(Lancashire)	check
North Yorkshire	UA	(North Yorkshire)	(Yorkshire)
East Riding of Yorkshire	UA	check	(Yorkshire)
Cheshire East	UA	(Cheshire)	check
Cheshire West and Chester	UA	(Cheshire)	check
Derbyshire Dales	NM	(Derbyshire)	check
North East Derbyshire	NM	(Derbyshire)	check
North Lincolnshire	UA	(Lincolnshire)	check
North East Lincolnshire	UA	(Lincolnshire)	check
Shropshire	UA	(Shropshire)	check
Staffordshire Moorlands	NM	(Staffordshire)	check
East Staffordshire	NM	(Staffordshire)	check
South Staffordshire	NM	(Staffordshire)	check
North West Leicestershire	NM	(Leicestershire)	check
Rutland	UA	(Rutland)	check
Kings Lynn and West Norfolk	NM	(Norfolk)	check
North Norfolk	NM	(Norfolk)	check
South Norfolk	NM	(Norfolk)	check
Herefordshire	UA	(Herefordshire)	check
North Warwickshire	NM	(Warwickshire)	check
North Northamptonshire	UA	(Northamptonshire)	check
West Northamptonshire	UA	(Northamptonshire)	check
Huntingdonshire	NM	X mark	check
South Cambridgeshire	NM	(Cambridgeshire)	check
East Cambridgeshire	NM	(Cambridgeshire)	check
East Suffolk	NM	(Suffolk)	check
Mid Suffolk	NM	(Suffolk)	check
West Suffolk	NM	(Suffolk)	check
South Gloucestershire	UA	(Gloucestershire)	check
South Oxfordshire	NM	(Oxfordshire)	check
West Oxfordshire	NM	(Oxfordshire)	check
Buckinghamshire	UA	check	check
Central Bedfordshire	UA	(Bedfordshire)	check
North Hertfordshire	NM	(Hertfordshire)	check
East Hertfordshire	NM	(Hertfordshire)	check
Bristol	UA	check	X mark
Wiltshire	UA	check	check
West Berkshire	UA	(Berkshire)	check
Cornwall	UA	check	check
Somerset	UA	(Somerset)	check
Bath and North East Somerset	UA	(Somerset)	check
North Somerset	UA	(Somerset)	check
Dorset	UA	(Dorset)	check
East Hampshire	NM	(Hampshire)	check
Mid Sussex	NM	(West Sussex)	(Sussex)

== Map ==
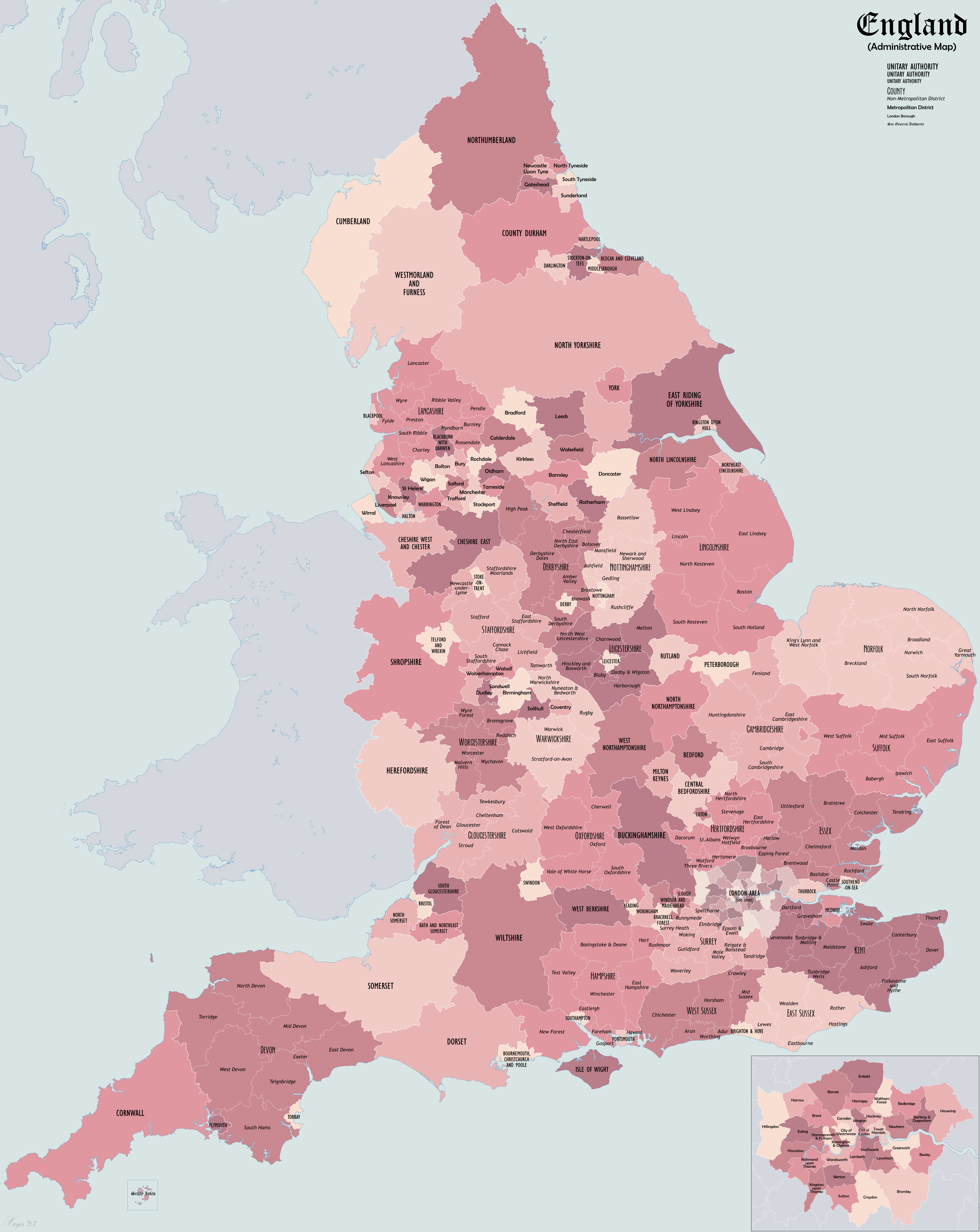
The districts in 2023

== See also ==
- List of English districts
- List of English districts by population
- List of English districts by area
- List of English districts by population density
- List of English districts by ethnicity
- List of local governments in the United Kingdom
