= Dumbarton (disambiguation) =

Dumbarton is a town in Scotland. It may also refer to:

== Associations with Scotland ==
- The County of Dumbarton in Scotland
- Dumbarton (Parliament of Scotland constituency), a constituency prior to 1707
- Dumbarton (Scottish Parliament constituency)
- Dumbarton (UK Parliament constituency), a former UK Parliament constituency
- Dumbarton (ward), a council ward
- Dumbarton (district), the local authority which covered the town and surrounding area between 1975 and 1996
- Dumbarton F.C., a Scottish Second Division football (soccer) team
- The "Kingdom of Dumbarton" is a description of the Kingdom of Strathclyde, a post-Roman kingdom based on Dumbarton Rock and the valley of the River Clyde in Britain, absorbed into the Kingdom of Scotland in the 11th Century.

== Associations with the New World ==
- Dumbarton, Western Australia, locality near Toodyay, Western Australia
- Dumbarton Parish, New Brunswick a civil parish in Canada
- Dumbarton Bridge (California), a bridge across the San Francisco Bay in California
- Dumbarton Bridge (Washington, D.C.), a bridge across Rock Creek Park in Washington, D.C.
- Dumbarton Oaks, in Georgetown, Washington, D.C.
- Dumbarton House, in Georgetown, Washington, D.C.
- Concerto in E-flat (Dumbarton Oaks), a 1938 concerto by Igor Stravinsky
- Dumbarton Oaks Conference, the meeting where the United Nations was formulated and negotiated
- Dumbarton, Virginia, a census-designated place and neighborhood in Henrico County, Virginia

== Title ==
- Earl of Dumbarton, title for son of Prince Harry

== See also ==
- Dumbarton Castle
- HMS Dumbarton Castle, the name of a number of warships
- Dunbarton (disambiguation)
