= SEStran =

SESTRAN
- Type: Regional Transport Partnership
- Industry: Public transport
- Founded: 1 December 2005 (under Transport (Scotland) Act 2005)
- Headquarters: Area 3D; Victoria Quay; Edinburgh; EH6 6QQ; Scotland
- Area served: Fife, Lothian, Scottish Borders, Falkirk and Clackmannanshire
- Key people: Jim Grieve (director)
- Products: Rail, bus and cycle services
- Parent: Transport Scotland

The South-East Scotland Transport Partnership (branded SEStran) is a statutory regional transport partnership in Scotland.

== History ==
Sestran was created on 28 March 1998 to identify, develop, and implement mutually beneficial solutions to transportation-related issues across multiple council areas.

SEStran implemented integrated ticketing under a scheme known as One-Ticket in 2001.

On 1 December 2005, SEStran was revised to match the new 7 Scottish government regional transport partnerships. This resulted in Stirling council being moved into the new Tactran area.

SEStran launched a real time passenger information (RTPI) system in 2014.

== Operating area ==
SEStran covers most of South East and Central Scotland, and includes the following local authorities:

- Fife
- East Lothian
- Midlothian
- West Lothian
- Edinburgh
- Scottish Borders
- Falkirk
- Clackmannanshire

Until 2005 the following were also part of the scheme.

- Stirling

== Functions ==
SESTRAN is an independent organisation that is tasked with improving local transport in the South East of Scotland. It is governed by a joint board, where around two-thirds of members are local councillors from affiliated councils, with the remainder made up of business and industry professionals. It was first tasked with producing a regional development strategy and delivery plan to set out what projects would be delivered, such as improving park and ride sites and real-time information displays on Edinburgh's bus network.

SEStran is responsible for operating ferry services.
