= Dunbartonshire and Argyll & Bute =

Administrative division of Scotland

Dunbartonshire and Argyll & Bute is an administrative division of Scotland, used for electoral registration and property valuation; and for the administration of criminal justice social work services. It consists of Argyll and Bute, East Dunbartonshire, and West Dunbartonshire and is administered under the Dunbartonshire and Argyll & Bute Valuation Joint Board.
