= ZetTrans =

- Type: Regional Transport Partnership
- Industry: Public transport
- Founded: 1 December 2005 (under Transport (Scotland) Act 2005)
- Headquarters: 8 North Ness Business Park; Lerwick; Shetland; ZE1 0LZ
- Area served: Shetland Islands
- Products: Rail, bus and cycle services
- Parent: Transport Scotland
- Website: https://www.zettrans.org.uk

ZetTrans is the statutory regional transport partnership for the Shetland Islands. It was created by Transport Scotland under the Transport (Scotland) Act 2005, along with six similar groups covering other areas of Scotland.

== Functions ==
ZetTrans develops regional transport policy for the Shetland Isles, maintaining infrastructure and providing provision of bus, ferry and air services, as well as supporting sustainable transport.

It is governed by a joint board, whose membership includes representatives of Shetland Islands Council, NHS Shetland and Highlands and Islands Enterprise.

== Operations ==
ZetTrans specifies and subsidises local bus, ferry, and plane services, although the routes themselves are operated by private companies or Shetland Islands Council. The partnership supports a car sharing scheme, which is operated by Shetland Islands Council, in partnership with Enterprise Car Club.

The partnership also operates an online travel planner.
