= HITRANS =

Regional transport partnership in Scotland

- Type: Regional Transport Partnership
- Industry: Public transport
- Founded: 1 December 2005 (under Transport (Scotland) Act 2005)
- Headquarters: 7 Ardross Terrace; Inverness; IV3 5NQ; Scotland
- Area served: Na h-Eileanan Siar, Highland, Moray, Orkney Islands and Argyll and Bute
- Products: Rail, bus and cycle services
- Parent: Transport Scotland
- Website: hitrans.org.uk

The Highlands and Islands Transport Partnership (HITRANS) is the statutory regional transport partnership for Na h-Eileanan Siar, Highland, Moray, Orkney Islands and Argyll and Bute (less the Helensburgh and Lomond area, which is covered by the Strathclyde Partnership for Transport).

It was created by Transport Scotland under the Transport (Scotland) Act 2005, along with six similar groups covering other areas of Scotland. HITRANS covers the largest area of any such partnership in Scotland, covering over 50% of the country's total landmass.

== Functions ==
Its main functions are to determine and deliver better transport, both locally and nationally, and to act as a catalyst for regeneration of the region's economy.

HITRANS makes plans through its Regional Strategy, which was first approved by the Scottish Government in 2008. It was later refreshed in 2017.

In January 2020, HITRANS introduced an electric bike hire scheme in partnership with three local cycle shops in Aviemore, Fort William and Grantown on Spey, who each received six e-bikes funded by the Scottish Government.

HITRANS maintains the HI-BIKE app which provides access to e-bikes.
