= Nestrans =

Transport partnership in the North East of Scotland

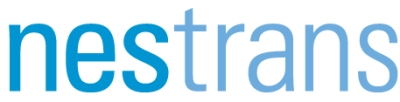
Nestrans logo

Nestrans (the North East of Scotland Transport Partnership) is a regional transport partnership covering Aberdeen City Council and Aberdeenshire Council. It was a voluntary partnership until it was made statutory by the Scottish Executive in 2006 under the Transport (Scotland) Act 2005.

Its main role is to develop and deliver strategic transport plans across the North East of Scotland. Its responsibilities include setting transport policy concerning buses, rail, roads.

It is responsible for the Aberdeen Rapid Transit scheme.
