= SWestrans =

- Type: Regional Transport Partnership
- Industry: Public transport
- Founded: 1 December 2005 (under Transport (Scotland) Act 2005)
- Headquarters: Militia House; English Street; Dumfries DG1 2HR; Scotland
- Area served: Dumfries and Galloway
- Products: Rail, bus and cycle services
- Parent: Transport Scotland
- Website: swestrans.org.uk

The South West of Scotland Transport Partnership (branded SWestrans) is a regional transport partnership. There are other similar groups covering the rest of Scotland which were created under the Transport (Scotland) Act 2005. SWestrans covers the Dumfries and Galloway council area.

It sets the transport policy for the council and It makes plans, through its regional transport strategy.

SWestrans is responsible for developing transport policies in relation to road, rail, ferries, buses, cycling, walking.
