= Tactran =

- Type: Regional Transport Partnership
- Industry: Public transport
- Founded: 1 December 2005 (under Transport (Scotland) Act 2005)
- Area served: Tayside and Central Scotland
- Products: Rail, bus and cycle services
- Parent: Transport Scotland

The Tayside and Central Scotland Transport Partnership (Tactran) is the statutory regional transport partnership covering the Angus, Dundee City, Perth and Kinross and Stirling council areas.

Tactran was established under the Transport (Scotland) Act 2005.

Unlike the other regional transport partnerships, Tactran is polycentric, covering three separate travel-to-work areas: Dundee, Perth and Stirling.

Tactran is responsible for setting policies on rail, cycling, walking, buses.

In partnership with NHS Tayside, it maintains an app, Go NHS Tayside, to help patients attend hospital appointments.
