= Strathclyde Partnership for Transport =

Regional transport partnership for the Strathclyde area of western Scotland

- Formerly: Glasgow Corporation Transport (1894-1972); Greater Glasgow Passenger Transport Executive (1972-1983); Strathclyde Passenger Transport Executive (1983–1996); Strathclyde Passenger Transport Authority (1996–2006)
- Type: Passenger Transport Executive
- Industry: Public transport
- Founded: 1972
- Headquarters: 131 St Vincent Street; Glasgow; G2 5JF
- Area served: Strathclyde
- Key people: Valerie Davidson, Chief Executive; Councillor Stephen Dornan, Chair
- Products: Rail, subway, bus and ferry services
- Parent: Transport Scotland
- Website: www.spt.co.uk

Strathclyde Partnership for Transport (SPT) is a regional transport partnership for the Strathclyde area of western Scotland. It is responsible for planning and coordinating regional transport, especially the public transport system in the area, including responsibility for operating the Glasgow Subway, the third-oldest in the world.

== History ==
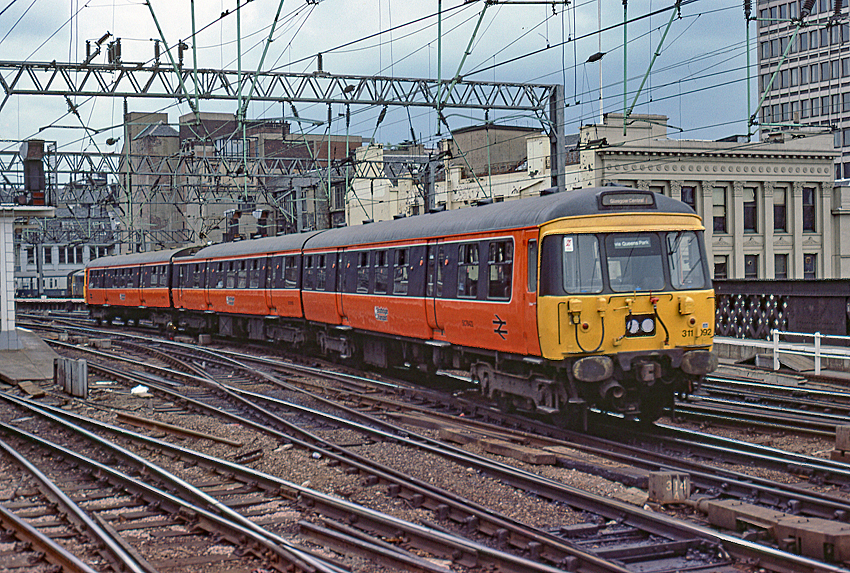
The orange and black colour scheme of the Strathclyde PTE is illustrated on a Class 311 unit seen at Glasgow Central station in May 1984

The principal predecessor to SPT was the Greater Glasgow Passenger Transport Executive (GGPTE) set up in 1972 to take over the Glasgow Corporation's public transport functions and to co-ordinate public transport in the Clyde Valley. In 1983 it was replaced by the Strathclyde Passenger Transport Executive (SPTE), under the overall direction of Strathclyde Regional Council. Section 40 of the Local Government etc. (Scotland) Act 1994 created a new statutory corporation, the Strathclyde Passenger Transport Authority (SPTA), which took over "all of the functions, staff, property, rights, liabilities and obligations of Strathclyde Regional Council as Passenger Transport Authority" on 1 April 1996. The Executive was reincorporated as a body consisting of councillors drawn from the 12 Council Areas which succeeded Strathclyde Region:

- Argyll and Bute
- West Dunbartonshire
- East Dunbartonshire
- North Lanarkshire
- South Lanarkshire
- Glasgow City
- South Ayrshire
- East Ayrshire
- North Ayrshire
- Inverclyde
- Renfrewshire
- East Renfrewshire

It also included nine transport experts appointed by the then Scottish Executive.

On 1 April 2006 – following the passing of the Transport (Scotland) Act 2005 – Strathclyde Passenger Transport Executive (and Authority), along with the WESTRANS voluntary regional transport partnership, were replaced by the Strathclyde Partnership for Transport. The new national agency Transport Scotland was created at the same time. At this latest reorganisation SPT gained responsibility for planning all regional transport (not just public transport) though it lost a number of specific powers relating to rail franchising and concessionary fares. There was no change in abbreviation (still SPT) or branding or in its major operational functions.

== Organisation ==
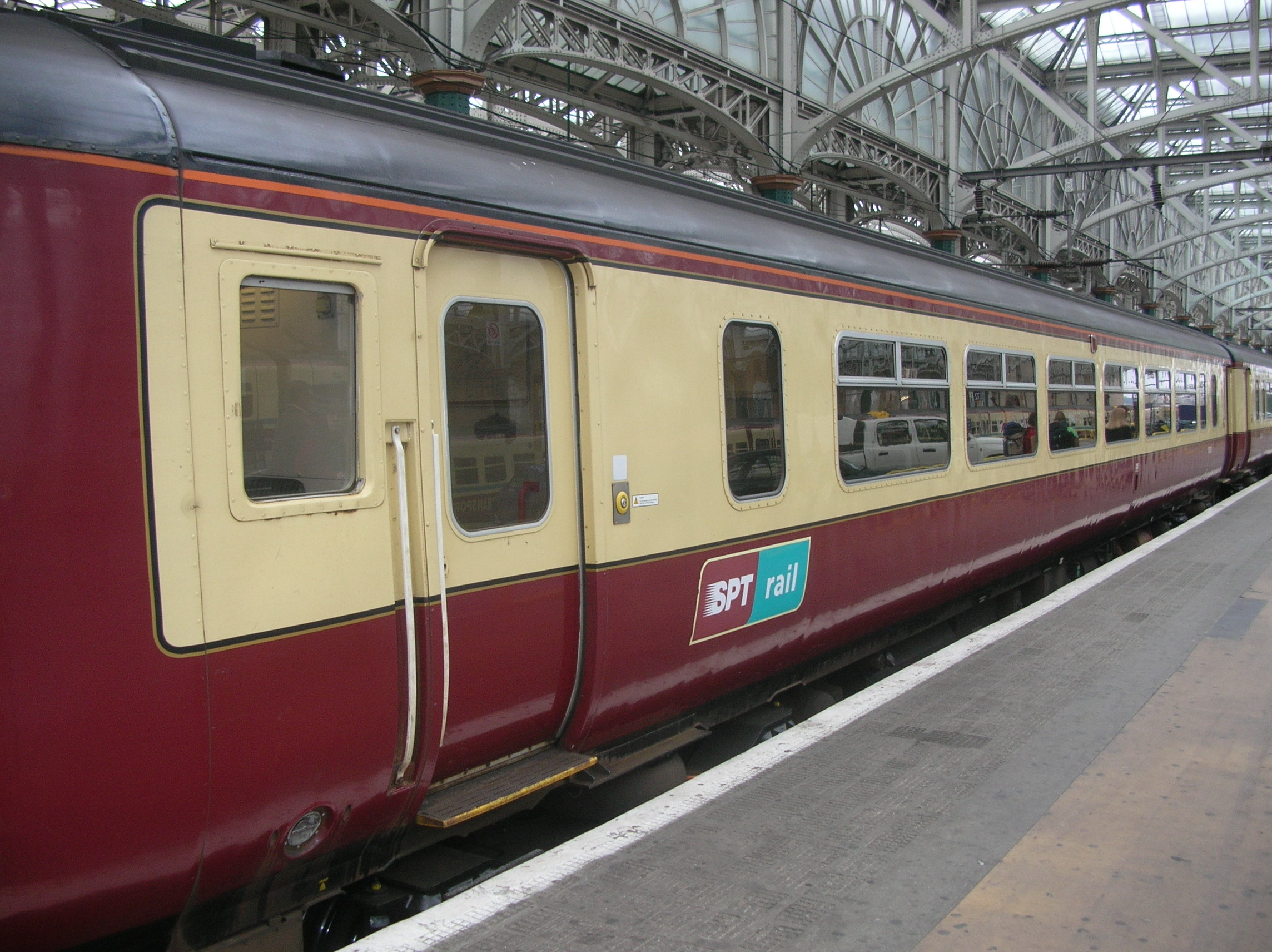
A Class 156 train in SPT livery at Glasgow Central station

SPT has the following main responsibilities:

- Developing a regional transport strategy for west central Scotland
- Planning of public transport investment
- Operation of the Glasgow Subway
- Operation and maintenance of bus stations, bus stops, travel centres and other support infrastructure
- Provision of some subsidised bus services, where no commercial services exists
- Provision of dial-a-bus and ring'n'ride services
- Issuing ZoneCard tickets, and dividing the revenue between participating transport providers

== Bus services ==
Logo of SPT Bus

Until 1986 SPT (and the Greater Glasgow Passenger Transport Executive before it) was directly responsible for running the municipal bus services in Glasgow, and owned both the buses and the necessary supporting infrastructure. The Transport Act 1985 deregulated the bus industry and SPT was subsequently forced to sell off its bus operations. The main bus operator in Glasgow is now First Glasgow, although SPT owns the city's Buchanan Bus Station, the largest bus station in Scotland.

The Greater Glasgow Passenger Transport Executive (GGPTE), the forerunner of SPTE, started operations in 1973, taking over the entire municipal owned and operated bus, and Underground railway, services of Glasgow Corporation Transport (GCT), which had been in existence from 1894 to 1973. They used a new livery which was a variation of the previous GCT colours of green, yellow and cream. The new livery had Verona green on the lower panels, and yellow between decks, white was used for window surrounds, and the roof. A stylised "GG" logo was applied to the forward yellow side panels. At bus stops, pennants had GG branding along with Scottish Bus Group branding on bus stops that were also used by the SBG. The orange and black colour scheme used later on in the 1980s to 1990s was originally a special livery for a small fleet of cut down single deck Leyland Atlanteans that operated the Glasgow Central to Queen Street rail link service.

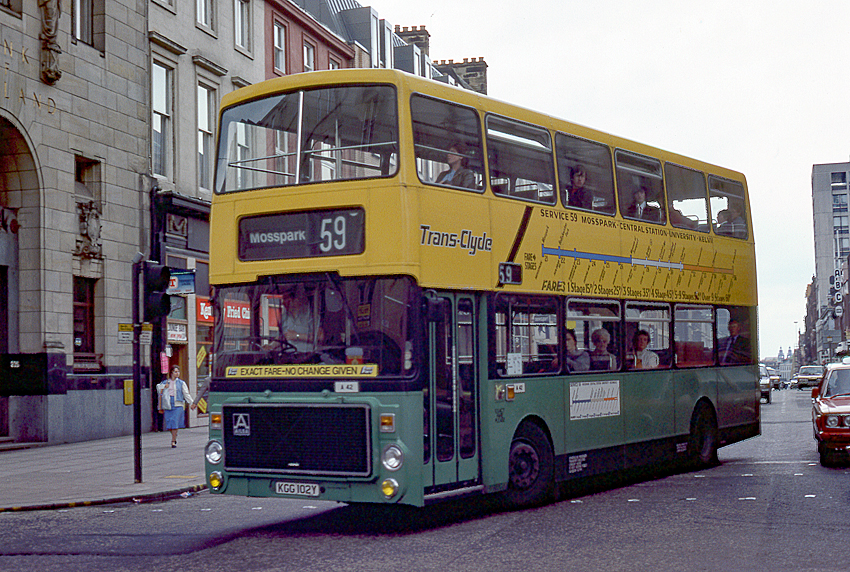
Volvo Ailsa in Trans-Clyde livery

As GCT had done, the GGPTE continued to buy large numbers of Leyland Atlantean double-decker buses, they were by far the most numerous type of bus in service, but GGPTE also introduced new bus types such as the Scania-MCW Metropolitan, and the front-engined, Scottish-built, Volvo Ailsa.

At the start of the 1980s GGPTE was replaced by SPTE who introduced "Fast Fare", an exact fare payment policy which is still being used today by SPTE's successors. Revised liveries were gradually introduced, with the green and yellow replacing most of the white on some buses, and matt black lower deck window surrounds applied to many others, the latter became the livery applied to new buses. Logos also changed, stylised "Trans-Clyde" lettering was displayed below the "GG" logo, which SPTE was also using on rail services and the Underground at the time. Gradually the "GG" logo was discontinued, and "Trans-Clyde" was used alone although a Volvo Citybus prototype was branded in the same livery with "Strathclyde" instead. Bus Stop pennants was replaced with "Trans-Clyde" branding. In the "Trans-Clyde" era Coach & Tour stock was painted white with a two tone brown stripe pattern and single deck buses were also painted white with a verona green skirt and yellow painted above the green.

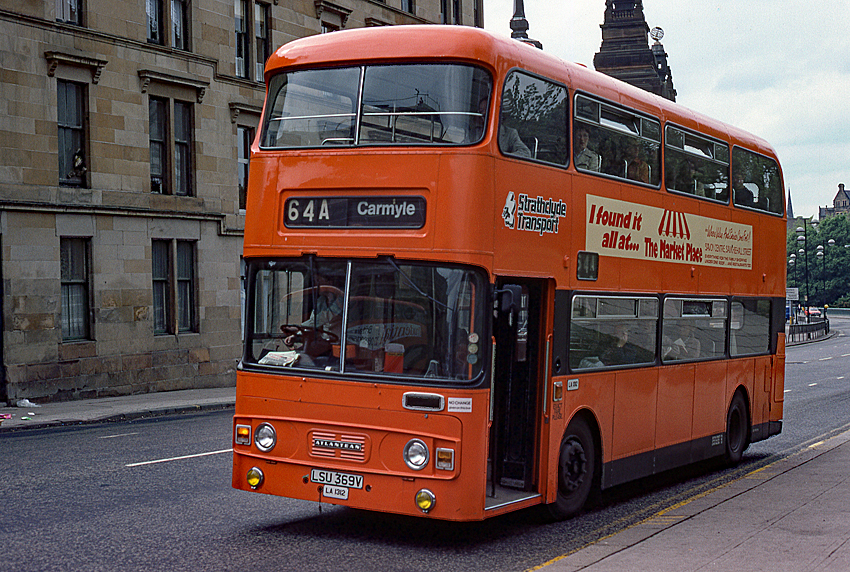
Leyland Atlantean in "Strathclyde red"

In 1983 SPTE changed their colours to orange (known as Strathclyde red) and black, the "Trans-Clyde" name was dropped and replaced with "Strathclyde Transport" branding with the Strathclyde Regional Council Scotland map logo, the typeface used on the former "Trans-Clyde" brand name was also used. Bus stop pennants were given "Strathclyde Transport" branding by having a sticker placed on top of the old "Trans-Clyde" name. The name lasted until 1986 due to deregulation of the bus industry, The orange and black colour scheme was kept and "Strathclyde's Buses" branding was used. New bus stop pennants were given with Strathclyde Transport branding but without Scottish Bus Group branding. The Regional Council logo was briefly retained, later on "Strathclyde's Buses" was used alone. In May 1992 a fire at Larkfield depot resulted in a loss of over 50 buses, to make up the number of buses lost in the fire SBL leased several double decks from Western Scottish, Tayside, Grampian, Manchester, Nottingham and Newcastle fleets also several demonstrator single deck buses were leased until a new order of Alexander bodied Leyland Olympians was delivered in August 1993. However some Leyland Atlanteans from the Nottingham & Newcastle fleets were bought to add to the new Olympians. The bus service was still in PTE control until 1993 when Strathclyde's Buses became employee-owned. During that time Strathclyde's Buses formed a low cost subsidiary called GCT - Comlaw No 313 Ltd which marked a return of the Trans Clyde era Verona Green, Black and Yellow as well as taking over Kelvin Central Buses which led to a cascade of Strathclyde Buses vehicles in KCB colours and KCB was rebranded as "KCB Network". At that time SPTE acquired Buchanan Bus Station from Scottish Citylink which led to a substantial refurbishment completed in 1995. Both Strathclyde's Buses and GCT colour Schemes lasted until 1996 when First Glasgow took over Strathclyde's Buses. Single deckers at that time was also painted the same livery as their double deck counterpart and the coaches was painted orange on the top panels with deep white centre panels and black lower panels.

Currently SPT bus stop pennants have SPT branding with the corresponding council area logo next to the SPT logo. Buses on SPT subsidised services have a new SPT livery of orange however the new SPT orange colour is a brighter shade of orange than the previous "Strathclyde Red".

In May 2019, to celebrate 125 years of public transport in the city, First Glasgow painted 3 Wright Eclipse Gemini buses in 1960's Glasgow Corporation livery, 1970's GGPTE livery and 1980's Strathclyde Transport livery.

== Glasgow Subway ==
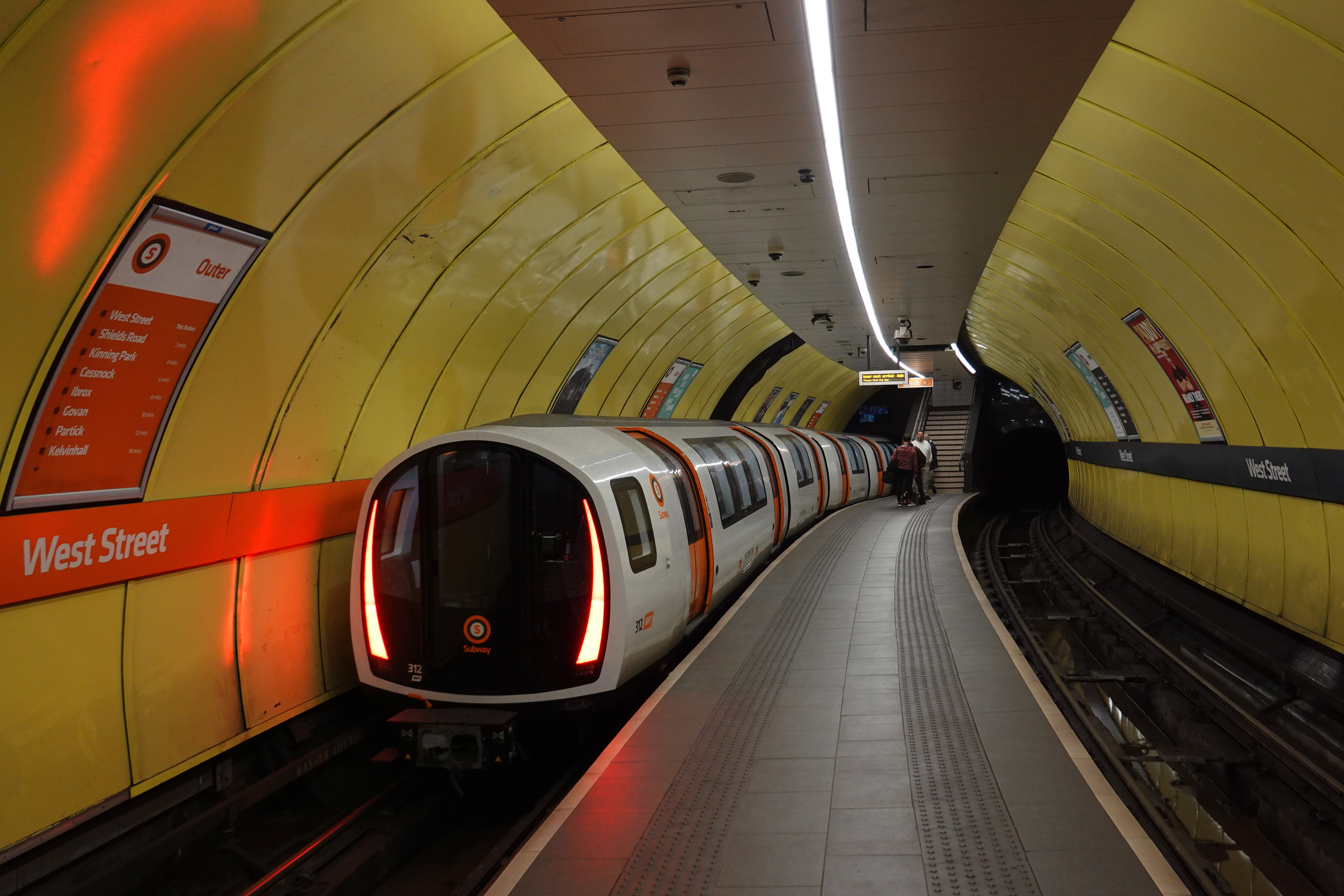
A Glasgow Subway train at West Street

The Glasgow Subway is the only underground metro system in Scotland. Opened in 1896, it is the third-oldest system of its type in the world, and the only one that has never been expanded from its original route. The circular route serves the city centre, the city's fashionable West End, and parts of the south side. Between the early 1930s and 2003 the system was officially known as the "Glasgow Underground", but many citizens always continued referring to it as the "Subway". In 2003, the "Subway" title was again used officially, with station signage and publications changed to reflect this. The Subway system is unique in terms of its scale and gauge - the Victorians designing an early tunnel through which the rolling stock had to pass which was not subsequently replicated in other systems. This has resulted in an expensive transportation mechanism which has proved stubborn to modernisation.

Recent proposals by the authority include the development of a second loop serving the east of the city and a new line cutting through the existing circle and providing links to low level rail, and a proposed ‘Crossrail’ project. This new line might have been ready for the Commonwealth Games in 2014. However it was later decided to revamp the subway over a long term programme which includes a refurbishment of all the stations, new escalators, improved disabled access, new ticketing system and later on driverless signals and trains. The first refurbished station Hillhead was completed and reopened in September 2012.

== Strathclyde rail services ==
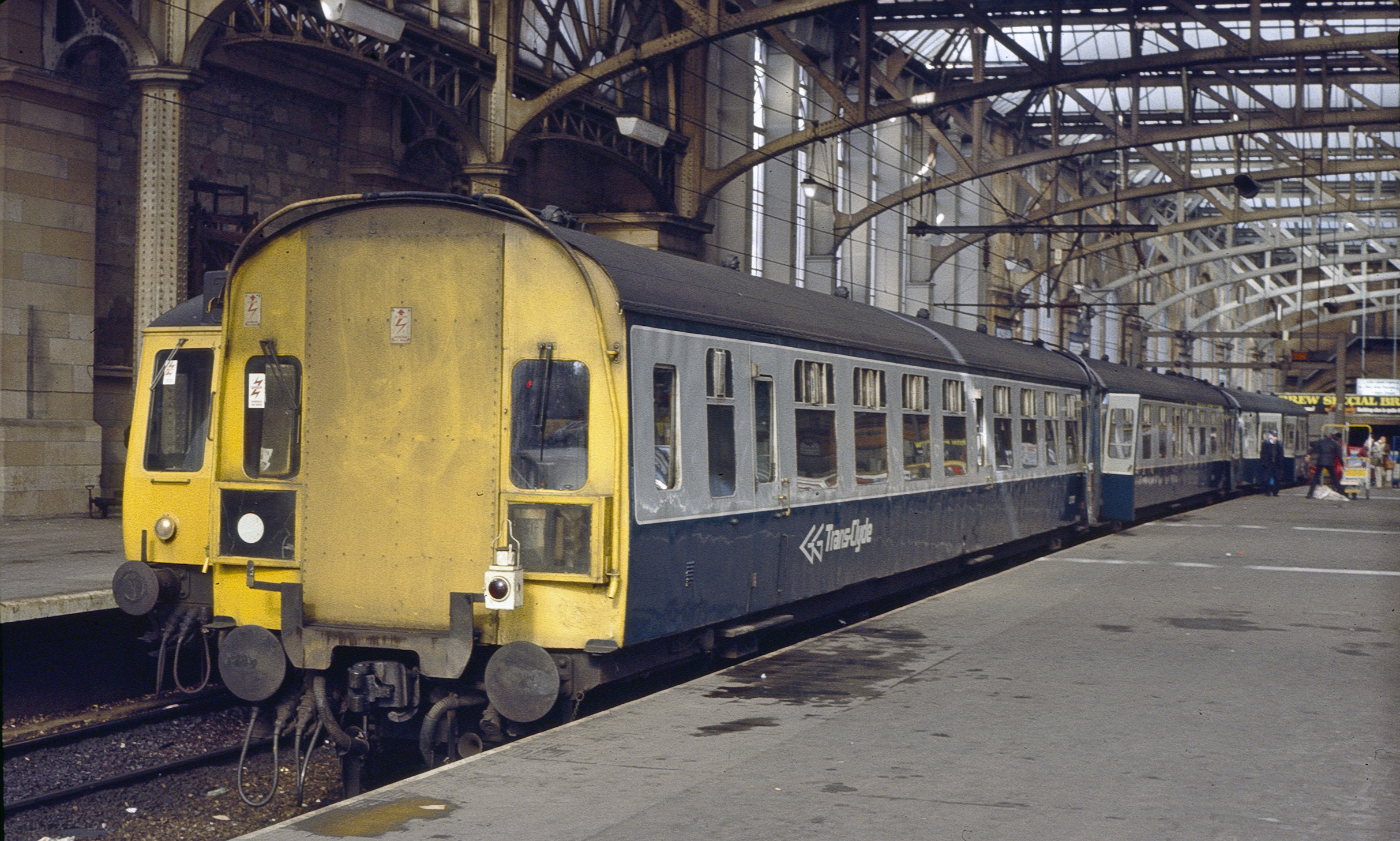
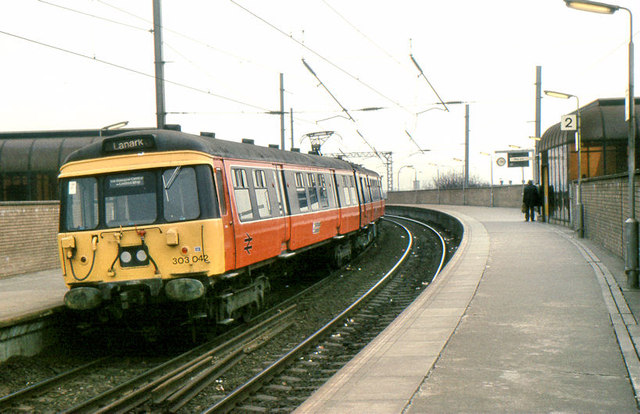
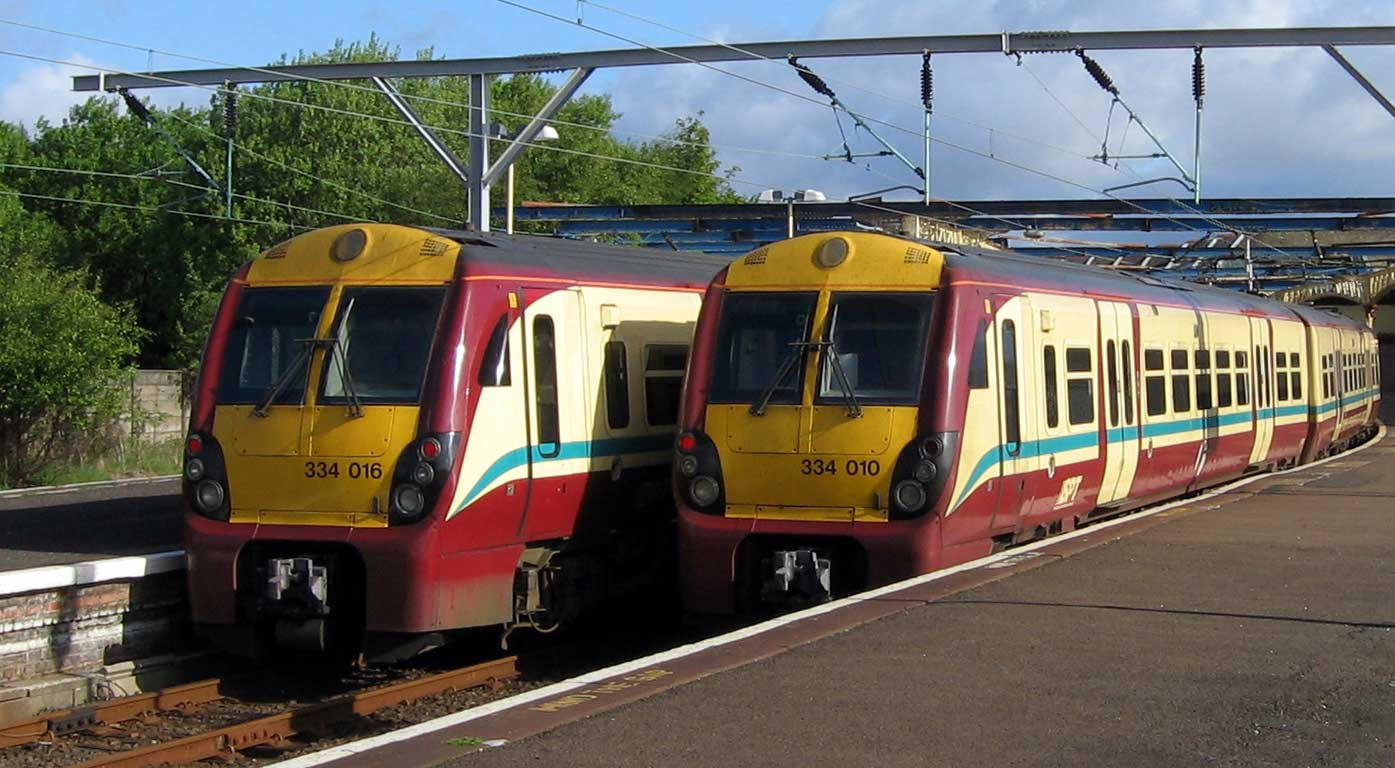
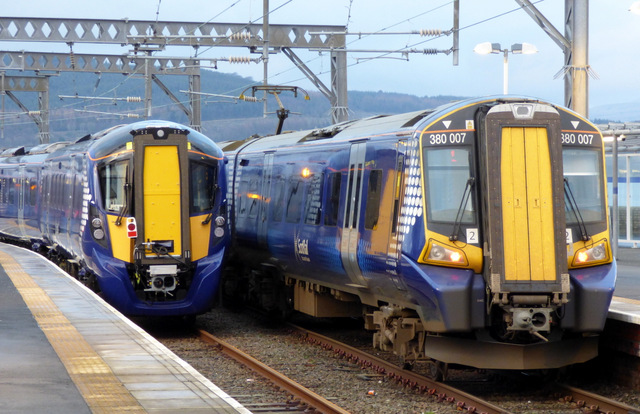
Strathclyde's rail services over the years

Glasgow has the largest network of suburban railway lines in the UK, other than London's. Much of the network is 25 kV AC electrified, with the exception of the Maryhill Line and South Western Line past Barrhead. Glasgow's main terminal stations are Glasgow Central and Glasgow Queen Street. Between 1972 and 2005, SPT and its predecessors were actively involved in the operation of suburban railways in the Greater Glasgow area.

The Greater Glasgow Passenger Transport Executive (GGPTE) was created, in 1972, to oversee all suburban railways in the Glasgow area. When the GGPTE was formed, the trains that ran in the GGPTE area were painted in the BR Blue livery that had been introduced across the BR network in the 1960s. A "GG" logo was applied on one side of the driving cars and the BR double-arrow logo was used on other side of the car, a practice common for all PTE's at the time.

In 1979, to commemorate the reopening of the Argyle Line and completion of the Glasgow Underground refurbishment, a London Underground style line diagram map was introduced which also showed ferry interchanges from both the PTE and Caledonian MacBrayne. The map was modified over time due to the closure of the Kilmacolm line in 1983 and additions such as the Maryhill line were added. The map was still in use until 2008 when Transport Scotland incorporated the map into a Scotland wide map. Some trains from 1975 to 1979 were also being painted in BR's new livery of white, with a blue stripe, with the addition of the GG logo. However, most trains were still being painted BR blue. From 1980 the trains were repainted in British Rail Blue/Grey livery; again the GG logo was used with the addition of "Trans-Clyde" branding. Later on, as on the buses, the latter was used alone. Regular BR branding was used at all stations apart from stations on the North Clyde and Cathcart Circle lines that still had "Glasgow Electric" signs dating back to 1960. Also the new Argyle line stations had dual Trans Clyde and BR signs. From 1983, due to SPTE's rebranding, the BR logo was now used along with "Strathclyde Transport" branding on the centre of each car, following repaints. In 1985, as with bus services and the Subway, orange and black livery was used, including a black with white bordered BR logo although some Class 311s still had BR Blue/Grey livery with either ScotRail or "Strathclyde Transport" branding until their withdrawal in 1990. Stations in the SPT area were also given "Strathclyde Transport" signage on the platforms and outside the station, as well as on certain bridges. From 1995 vinyls of the new SPT logo were placed on top of the old "Strathclyde Transport" logo. When BR was privatised, in 1997, new ScotRail signage with SPT branding was applied at the stations. The BR logo was replaced with the ScotRail logo. The orange and black livery was later replaced by carmine and cream, after a blue experimental livery on a Class 101, 101692. Then another experimental livery was tried, using carmine and cream on a Class 156 156433 named The Kilmarnock Edition. The carmine and cream livery had "SPT rail" branding. New signage, with "SPT rail", was placed at SPT stations.

SPT is no longer involved in the everyday operation of the rail network. The rolling stock was operated on behalf of SPT by First ScotRail (also part of FirstGroup) until 31 March 2015. Since 1 April 2022, Scottish Government-owned ScotRail have operated rail services.

In August 2008 the Scottish Government's agency Transport Scotland announced that all ScotRail trains (including former SPT services) would be repainted in Transport Scotland blue livery with white Saltire markings on the carriage ends, and SPT Rail branding and the carmine and cream livery were removed. In February 2018 ScotRail announced that the 1979 Class 314 trains were to be withdrawn from service and replaced by the Class 385.

== Ferry services ==
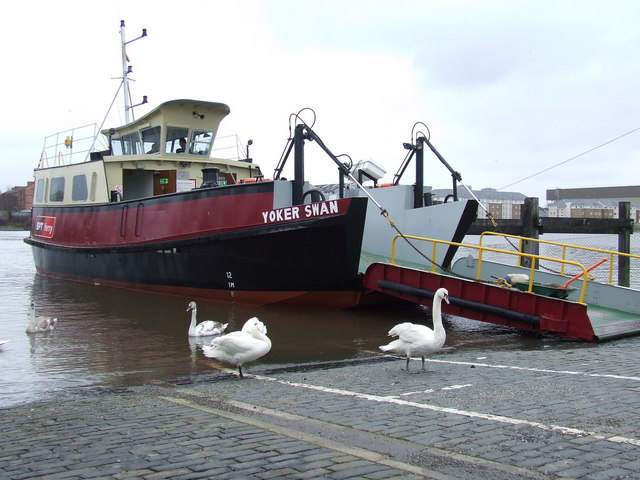
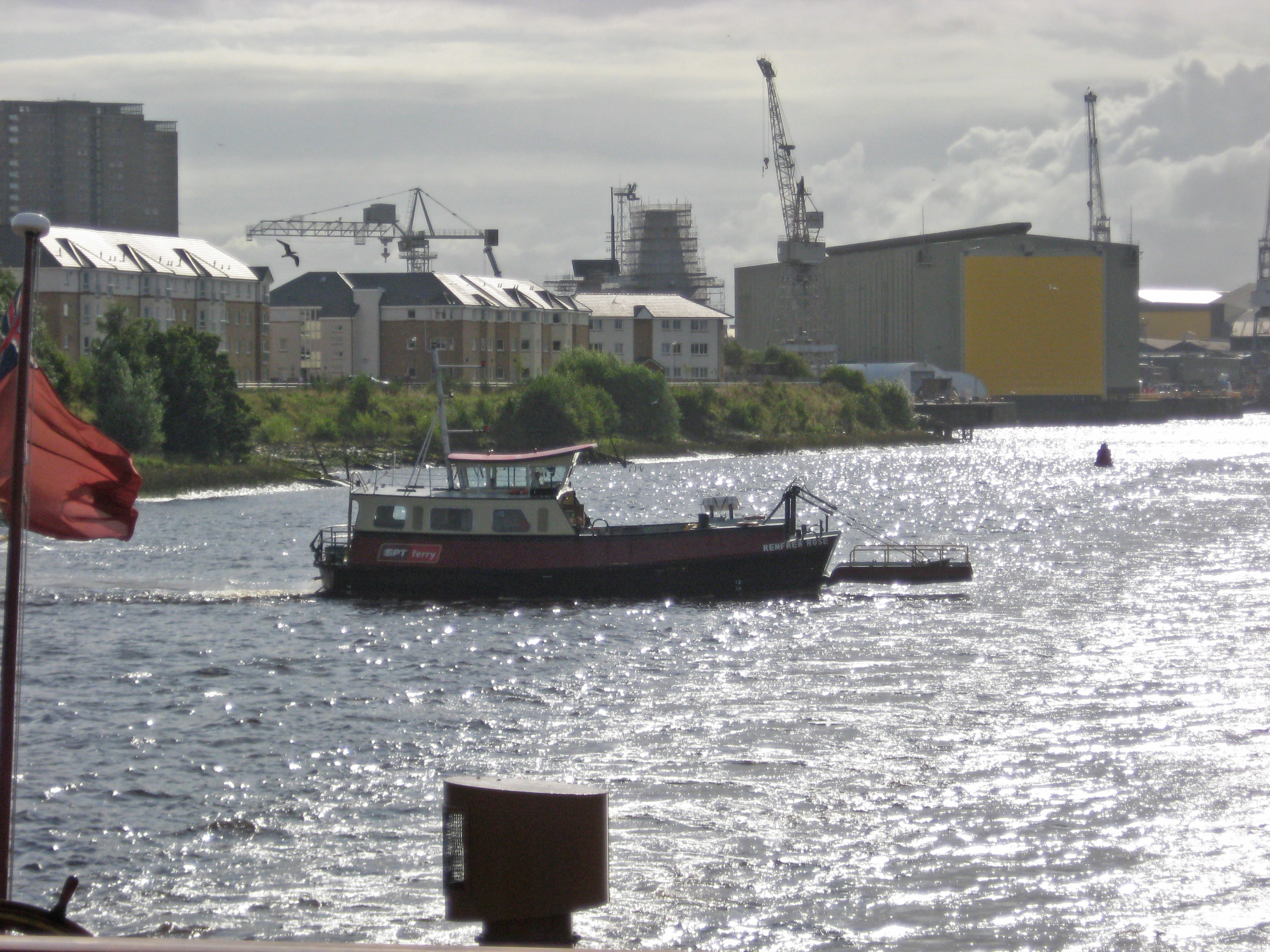
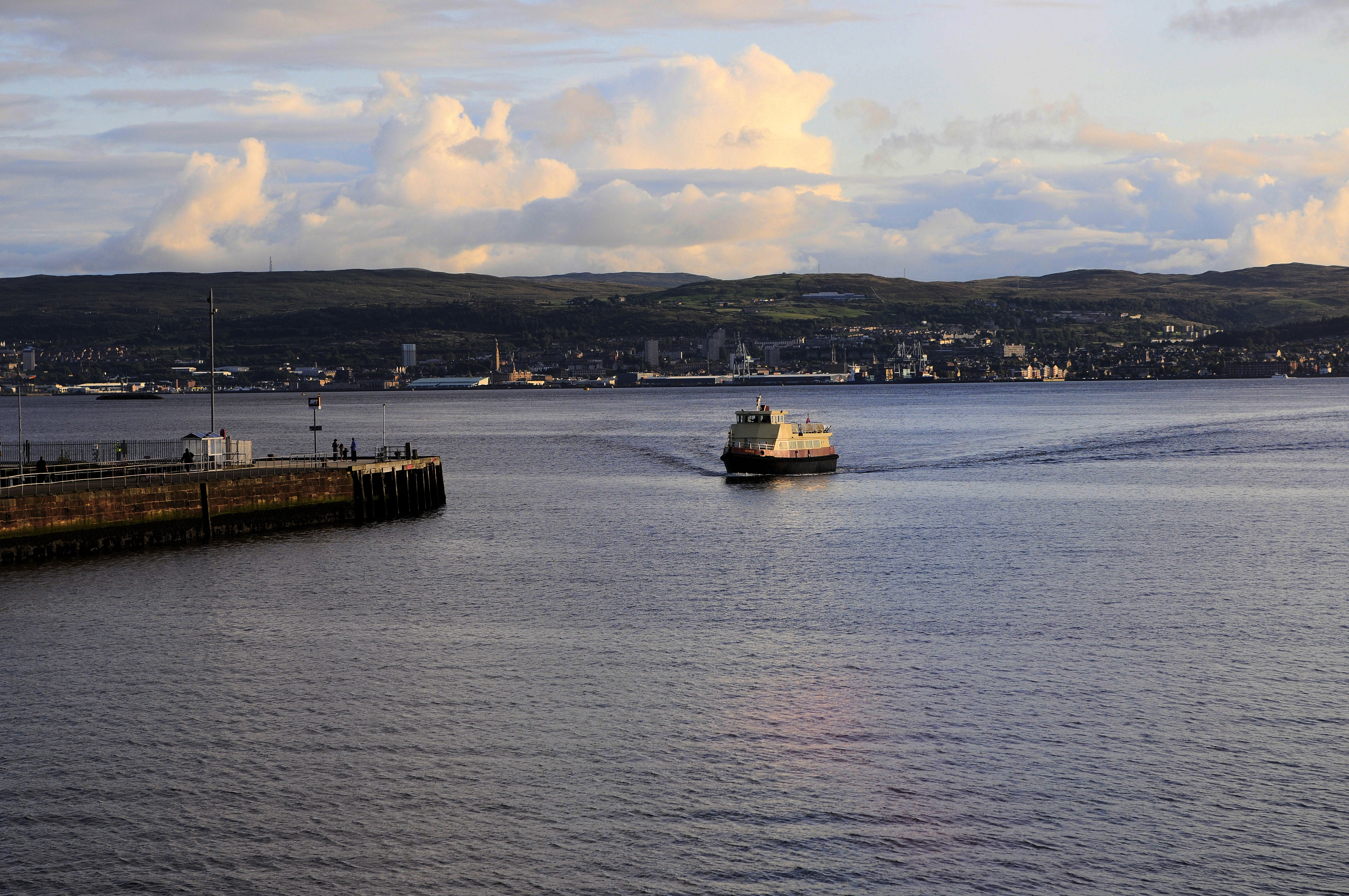
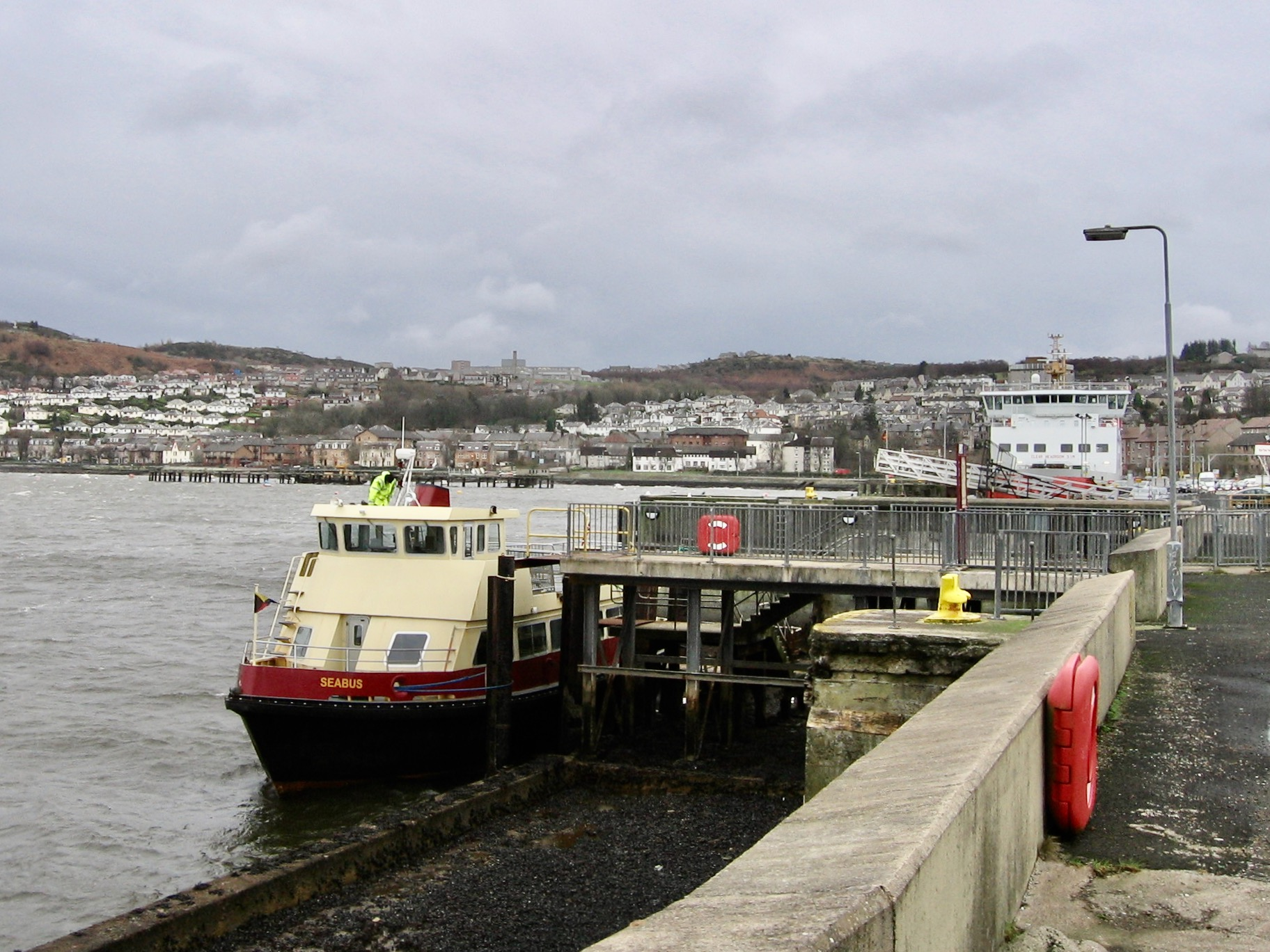
SPT ferry services

SPT operated the Renfrew Ferry until March 2010, when Silvers Marine took over the service trading as Clyde Link. In May 2025 the Renfrew ferry ceased operations being replaced by the Renfrew Bridge. SPT also subsidises the Gourock-Kilcreggan ferry service, which in the recent years have been operated by Clyde Marine (–2012, 2018–2020), Silvers Marine (trading as Clyde Link, 2012–2018), and Caledonian MacBrayne (2020–).

== See also ==
- Transport Scotland
- Passenger Transport Executive
- ZoneCard
- Commuter rail in the United Kingdom
