= History of fire brigades in the United Kingdom =

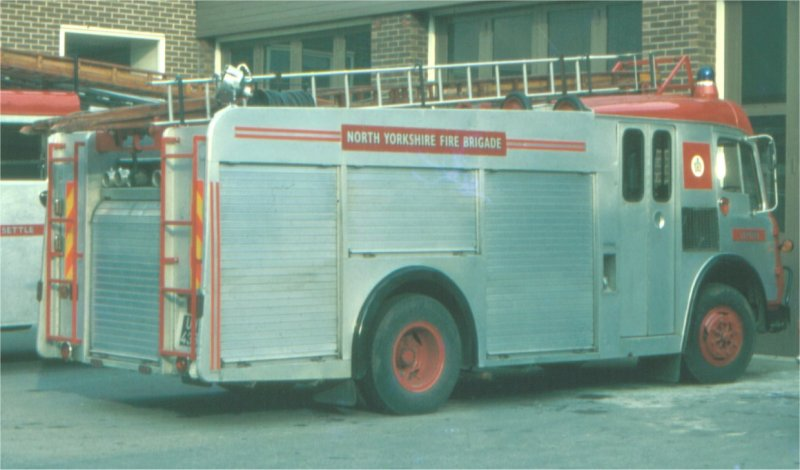
Pump showing the old North Yorkshire Fire Brigade name

The history of fire brigades in the United Kingdom charts the development of fire services in the United Kingdom from the creation of the United Kingdom to the present day.

== 19th century ==
Between the 17th century and the beginning of the 19th century, all fire engines and crews in the United Kingdom were either provided by voluntary bodies, parish authorities or insurance companies. James Braidwood founded the world's first municipal fire service in Edinburgh after the Great Fire of Edinburgh in 1824 destroyed much of the city's Old Town. Braidwood later went on to become superintendent of the London Fire Engine Establishment (LFEE), which brought together ten independent insurance company brigades in 1833. A 7-foot-tall (2.1 m) bronze statue of Braidwood, located in Parliament Square in Edinburgh, commemorates his achievements. The Society for the Protection of Life from Fire was formed in 1836 mainly to provide mobile escape ladders; protection of life was not the main concern of the insurance company brigades. Today it exists to give "recognition to individuals who perform acts of bravery in rescuing others from fire".

James Braidwood was killed at the Tooley Street fire of 1861, where a wall collapsed on top of him. This fire was a major factor in the decision of the British government, after much lobbying by liability-laden insurance companies and LFEE, to create the Metropolitan Fire Brigade in 1866. The MFB would be publicly funded and controlled through the Metropolitan Board of Works. Its first superintendent was Captain Sir Eyre Massey Shaw. In 1904, the MFB changed its name to the London Fire Brigade.

Outside London, new local government bodies created by late 19th century legislation (such as the Local Government Act 1894) took over responsibility for fire-fighting.

== 20th century ==
Before 1938, there were some 1,600 local fire brigades in operation. The Fire Brigades Act 1938 constituted the councils of all county boroughs and county districts (municipal boroughs, urban and rural districts) as fire authorities. The councils were required to provide the services for their borough or district of such a fire brigade and of such fire engines, appliances and equipment as may be necessary to meet efficiently all normal requirements. At roughly the same time, the Auxiliary Fire Service, consisting largely of unpaid volunteers, was formed in parallel to the Air Raid Precautions organisation. Every borough and urban district had an AFS unit, and they operated their own fire stations in parallel to the local authority. Members of the AFS could be called up for full-time paid service if necessary, a similar arrangement applied to the wartime Special Constabulary.

The effects of the Fire Brigades Act 1938 were short lived (though it was not repealed until 1947), as all local brigades and Auxiliary Fire Service units in Great Britain were merged into the National Fire Service in 1941, which was itself under the auspices of the Civil Defence Service. There was a separate National Fire Service (Northern Ireland). Before the war, there had been little or no standardisation of equipment, most importantly in the diameter of hydrant valves. This made regional integration difficult.

The 1938 Act was replaced by the Fire Services Act 1947, which disbanded the National Fire Service and made firefighting functions the responsibility of county and county borough councils, meaning there were still far fewer brigades than before the war. There were also slightly different arrangements in Scotland from England and Wales. The Auxiliary Fire Service was reformed in 1948 as a national fire reserve, and operated the famous Green Goddess "self-propelled pumps", tasked with relaying vast quantities of water into burning cities after a nuclear attack, and also with supporting local fire services.

Local government was completely reorganised in the mid-1970s (see Local Government Act 1972 and Local Government (Scotland) Act 1973), meaning many fire brigades were merged and renamed. There have been some other amalgamations since then, including the 2013 merger of all Scottish services into one, the Scottish Fire and Rescue Service.

Before 1974, all but one of the fire brigades in England and Wales used the term "Fire Brigade", the exception was the City of Salford, which called itself "Fire Department". After 1974, all but two of the new authorities adopted the term "Fire Service", the two exceptions being Avon County and County Cleveland. Most of the older county brigades who came through the reorganisation with little change also changed their names to "Fire Service", the only brigades not to adopt the term were London, Cornwall, East Sussex, Somerset, West Sussex and Wiltshire, all of which still retained the name "Fire Brigade". More recently, almost all fire authorities have changed their name to "Fire and Rescue Service", the only exceptions to this are, Cleveland and London who still use "Fire Brigade" and West Midlands Fire Service.

== Fire brigades in England ==
=== 1948–1974 ===
The following is a list of all the fire brigades created by the 1947 decentralisation, and also those created by mergers in the 1960s, up until local government reorganisation in 1974.

Brigade	Notes	Fate in the 1974 reorganisation
Barnsley County Borough FB		Merged to form South Yorkshire FS
Barrow-in-Furness County Borough FB		Merged to form Cumbria FS
City of Bath FB		Merged to form Avon County FB
Bedfordshire FB	Luton County Borough formed own brigade in 1964	Reabsorbed Luton County Borough FB
Berkshire and Reading FB	Combined brigade for administrative county of Berkshire, Reading County Borough, later	Lost Abingdon, Didcot and Wantage to Oxfordshire and gained Slough from Buckinghamshire
Birkenhead County Borough FB		Merged to form Merseyside FS
City of Birmingham FB		Merged to form West Midlands FS
Blackburn County Borough FB		Merged into Lancashire County FS
Blackpool County Borough FB		Merged into Lancashire County FS
Bolton County Borough FB		Merged to form Greater Manchester FS
Bootle County Borough FB		Merged to form Merseyside FS
Bournemouth County Borough FB		Merged into Dorset FS
City of Bradford FB		Merged to form West Yorkshire FS
Brighton County Borough FB		Merged into East Sussex FB
City of Bristol FB		Merged to form Avon County FB
Buckinghamshire FB		Lost Slough to Berkshire FB
Burnley County Borough FB		Merged into Lancashire County FS
Burton upon Trent County Borough FB		Merged into Staffordshire FS
Bury County Borough FB		Merged to form Greater Manchester FS
Cambridgeshire and Isle of Ely FB	Combined brigade for administrative counties of Cambridgeshire and the Isle of Ely until 1965, when Cambridgeshire and Isle of Ely county council formed	Merged to form Cambridgeshire FS
City of Canterbury FB	Formed part of combined brigade, known as Kent and Canterbury FB in Canterbury and Kent FB in remainder of County.	
City of Carlisle FB		Merged to form Cumbria FS
Cheshire FB		Lost area to Greater Manchester, Merseyside FS
City of Chester FB		Merged into Cheshire FS
Cornwall FB		No change (later became Cornwall County FB)
City of Coventry		Merged to form West Midlands FS
Croydon County Borough FB	Absorbed by London FB 1965	
Cumberland FB		Merged to form Cumbria FS
Darlington County Borough FB		Merged into County Durham County FB
Derby County Borough FB		Merged into Derbyshire FS
Derbyshire FB		Absorbed Derby County Borough FB
Devon FB		Absorbed Exeter and Plymouth
Dewsbury County Borough FB		Merged to form West Yorkshire FS
Doncaster County Borough FB		Merged to form South Yorkshire FS
Dorset FB		Absorbed Bournemouth County Borough FB
Dudley County Borough FB	Took in areas from Staffordshire FB 1967	Merged to form West Midlands FS
Durham County FB	Lost areas to Hartlepool CB 1967, Teesside CB 1974	Later absorbed into Cleveland County Fire Brigade
East Ham County Borough FB	Absorbed by London FB 1965	
East Riding of Yorkshire FB		Area split to form North Yorkshire FS and Humberside FS
East Sussex FB		Lost some area to West Sussex FS, gained Brighton, Eastbourne and Hastings
Eastbourne County Borough FB		Merged into East Sussex FS
Essex FB	Lost nine stations to London FB 1965.	Absorbed Southend County Borough FB
City of Exeter FB		Merged into Devon FS
City of Gloucester FB		Merged into Gloucestershire FS
Gloucestershire		Lost area to Avon County FS
Great Yarmouth County Borough FB		Merged into Norfolk FS
Grimsby County Borough FB		Merged to form Humberside FS
Halifax County Borough FB		Merged to form West Yorkshire FS
Hampshire FB		Gained Portsmouth, Southampton, lost Christchurch area to Dorset FS
Hastings County Borough FB		Merged into East Sussex FS
Herefordshire FB		Merged to form Hereford and Worcester FS
Hertfordshire FB	Lost East Barnet to London FB but gained Potters Bar from Middlesex 1965	No change
Holland FB County Lincolnshire		Merged to form Lincolnshire FS
Huddersfield County Borough FB		Merged to form West Yorkshire FS
Hull County Borough FB		Merged to form Humberside FS
Huntingdonshire FB	Merged with Soke of Peterborough FB 1965 to form Huntingdon and Peterborough FB	Merged into Cambridgeshire FS
Huntingdon and Peterborough FB	Formed from Soke of Peterborough FB and Huntingdonshire FB in 1965, when Huntingdon and Peterborough County Council formed	Merged into Cambridgeshire FS
Isle of Wight FB		No change
Kent FB	Combined brigade for Canterbury County Borough and administrative county of Kent. Lost part of area (present London Boroughs of Bexley and Bromley) to London FB 1965	No further change in 1974
Kesteven County FB		Merged to form Lincolnshire FS
Lancashire County FB		Lost area to Cumbria FS, Greater Manchester FS and Merseyside FS.
City of Leeds FB		Merged to form West Yorkshire FS
City of Leicester FB		Merged to form Leicestershire FS
Leicestershire and Rutland FB	Combined brigade for two administrative counties	Merged to form Leicestershire FS
City of Lincoln FB		Merged to form Lincolnshire FS
Lindsey County FB, Lincolnshire		Merged to form Lincolnshire FS
City of Liverpool FB		Merged to form Merseyside FS
London FB	Covered County of London until 1965, Greater London thereafter	No further change
Luton County Borough FB	Separated from Bedfordshire FB 1964	Bedfordshire FS
City of Manchester FB		Merged to form Greater Manchester FS
Middlesbrough County Borough FB	Became part of Teesside County Borough FB in 1974	Merged to form Cleveland County Fire Brigade
Middlesex FB	Abolished 1965 to London FB except for Potters Bar to Hertfordshire FB, Staines and Sunbury to Surrey FB	
Newcastle and Gateshead Joint FB	Combined brigade for two county boroughs	Merged to form Tyne and Wear FS
Norfolk FB		
North Riding of Yorkshire FB	Lost area to Teesside County Borough FB in 1968	Merged to form Cleveland FS
Northampton County Borough FB		Merged into Northamptonshire FS
Northamptonshire FB		No change
Northumberland FB		Merged to form Tyne and Wear FS
City of Norwich FB		Merged into Norfolk FS
City of Nottingham FB		Merged into Nottinghamshire FS
Nottinghamshire FB		
Oldham County Borough FB		Merged to form Greater Manchester FS
City of Oxford FB		Merged into Oxfordshire FS
Oxfordshire FB		
Soke of Peterborough FB	Merged with Huntingdonshire FB 1965 to form Huntingdon and Peterborough FB. (City of) Peterborough Volunteer FB also retained by county council	(Cambridgeshire FS)
City of Plymouth FB		Merged into Devon FS
City of Portsmouth FB		Merged into Hampshire FS
Preston County Borough FB		Merged into Lancashire County FS
Rochdale County Borough FB		Merged to form Greater Manchester FS
Rotherham County Borough FB		Merged to form South Yorkshire FS
City of Salford FD		Merged to form Greater Manchester FS
St Helens County Borough FB		Merged to form Merseyside FS
City of Sheffield FB		Merged to form South Yorkshire FS
Shropshire FB		No change
Smethwick and West Bromwich Joint FB	Combined brigade for two county boroughs. Abolished 1967: Became Warley County Borough FB and West Bromwich County Borough FB	Merged to form West Midlands FS
Solihull County Borough FB	Separated from Warwickshire FB 1964	Merged to form West Midlands FS
Somerset FB		Lost area to Avon FS
South Shields County Borough FB		Merged to form Tyne and Wear FS
Southampton County Borough FB	Renamed Southampton City FB 1964	To Hampshire FB
Southend County Borough FB		Merged into Essex FS
Southport County Borough FB		Merged to form Merseyside FS
Staffordshire FB	Lost area to various county boroughs in 1967.	Gained Stoke-on-Trent, lost area to West Midlands
Stockport County Borough FB		Merged to form Greater Manchester FS
Stoke-on-Trent County Borough FB		Merged into Staffordshire FS
Suffolk and Ipswich FB	Combined brigade for administrative counties of East and West Suffolk and Ipswich county borough.	Merged to form Suffolk FS
County Borough of Sunderland FB		Merged to form Tyne and Wear FS
Surrey FB	Lost 10 stations to London FB in 1965. But gained Staines and Sunbury from Middlesex	No further change
Teesside County Borough FB	Formed from Middlesbrough County Borough FB, parts of Durham FB, North Riding (Yorkshire) FB 1968	Cleveland County Fire Brigade
Tynemouth County Borough FB		Merged to form Tyne and Wear FS
Wakefield County Borough FB		Merged to form West Yorkshire FS
Wallasey County Borough FB		Merged to form Merseyside FS
Warley County Borough FB	Formed 1967 from the separation of Smethwick and West Bromwich Joint FB	West Midlands FS
Warrington County Borough FB		Merged to form Cheshire FS
Warwickshire FB	Solihull formed own brigade 1964	Lost area to West Midlands FS
West Bromwich County Borough FB	Formed 1967 from the separation of Smethwick and West Bromwich Joint FB	West Midlands FS
West Ham County Borough FB	Absorbed by London FB 1965	
West Hartlepool County Borough FB	Merged with part of Durham County Fire Brigade to form Hartlepool County Borough FB in 1967	Merged with Teesside County Borough FB and parts of Durham and North Riding Fire Brigades in 1974 to form Cleveland County FB
West Riding of Yorkshire FB		Split into West Yorkshire FS and South Yorkshire FS with losses to Cumbria FS, Humberside FS and Lancashire County FS
West Sussex FB		Gained area from East Sussex
Westmorland FB		Merged to form Cumbria FS
Wigan County Borough FB		Merged to form Greater Manchester FS
Wiltshire FB		No change
Wolverhampton County Borough FB		Merged to form West Midlands FS
Worcester City and County FB	Combined brigade for county borough of Worcester and administrative county of Worcestershire	Merged to form Hereford and Worcester FS
City of York FB		Merged to form North Yorkshire FS

=== 1974 onwards ===
From 1974, each of the new county councils and the Greater London Council (GLC) maintained a separate fire brigade. In 1986, the GLC and the six metropolitan county councils were abolished. This led to the establishment of fire and civil defence authorities which were joint boards of London and metropolitan borough councils. Local government reform in the 1990s created a number of unitary authorities, usually termed as district or borough councils but sometimes also county councils, and accordingly combined fire authorities constituted in a number of counties.

Brigade	Notes
Avon FS	Since 1996 administered by combined fire authority (CFA) of Bath and North East Somerset, Bristol City, North Somerset, and South Gloucestershire councils. Name changed to Avon Fire and Rescue Service in 2004.
Bedfordshire FS	Since 1997 administered by a CFA of Bedfordshire County and Luton Borough councils. Bedfordshire has since been split up into unitary authorities, so this CFA now represents Luton Borough, Bedford Borough and Central Bedfordshire District councils. Name changed to Bedfordshire and Luton Fire and Rescue Service.
Royal Berkshire FS	Change of name from Royal Berkshire FB to Royal Berkshire FS in 1985. Since 1998 administered by a CFA of six unitary authorities.
Buckinghamshire FS	Since 1997 administered by a CFA of Buckinghamshire County and Milton Keynes Borough Councils. Name changed to Buckinghamshire FRS.
Cambridgeshire FS	Since 1998 administered by a CFA of Cambridgeshire County and Peterborough City Councils. Name changed to Cambridgeshire FRS.
Cheshire FS	Since 1998 administered by a CFA of Cheshire, Halton and Warrington councils. Name changed to Cheshire FRS.
Cleveland FB	Since 1996 administered by a CFA of Hartlepool, Middlesbrough, Stockton-on-Tees and Redcar and Cleveland.
Cornwall County FB	Name changed to Cornwall FRS
Cumbria FS	Name changed to Cumbria FRS.
Derbyshire FS	Since 1997 administered by a CFA of Derby City and Derbyshire County councils. Name changed to Derbyshire FRS.
Devon FS	From 1998 administered by CFA of Devon County, Plymouth City and Torbay Borough councils. Merged into Devon and Somerset FRS in 2007.
Devon and Somerset FRS	Formed 2007 by merger of Devon and Somerset FBs. Administered by CFA of Devon County, Somerset County, Plymouth City and Torbay Borough Councils.
Dorset FS	Since 1997 administered by a CFA of Dorset County and Bournemouth and Poole Borough Councils. Name changed to Dorset FRS.
Durham County FB	Renamed Durham County Fire Brigade in 1992. Then became County Durham and Darlington Fire and Rescue Brigade in 1997 when administered by a Combined Fire Authority of Durham County Council and Darlington Borough Council. Name changed to County Durham and Darlington FRS in 2003.
East Sussex FB	Since 1997 administered by a CFA of Brighton and Hove City and East Sussex County councils. Name changed to East Sussex FRS.
Essex FB	Since 1998 administered CFA of Essex County and Southend-on-Sea and Thurrock Borough councils. Name changed to Essex County FRS in 1985.
Gloucestershire FS	Name changed to Gloucestershire FRS.
Greater Manchester County FS	Was administered by Greater Manchester County Council until its abolition in 1986, afterwards administered by the Greater Manchester Fire and Rescue Authority. Name of the service itself changed to Greater Manchester FRS.
Hampshire FS	Since 1997 administered by a CFA of Hampshire County and Portsmouth and Southampton city councils. Name changed to Hampshire FRS. Merged with Isle of Wight Fire and Rescue Service on 1 April 2021 to create Hampshire & Isle of Wight Fire and Rescue Service
Hereford and Worcester FS	Since 1998 administered by a CFA of Herefordshire and Worcestershire county councils. Name changed to Hereford and Worcester FRS.
Hertfordshire FS	Name changed to Hertfordshire FRS.
Humberside FB	Since 1998 administered by a CFA of East Riding of Yorkshire, Hull City, North Lincolnshire and North East Lincolnshire councils. Name changed to Humberside FRS.
Isle of Wight FS	Name changed to Isle of Wight FRS. Merged with Hampshire Fire & Rescue Service on 1 April 2021 to create Hampshire & Isle of Wight Fire and Rescue Service
Kent FB	Since 1998 administered by a CFA of Kent County and Medway Borough councils. Name changed to Kent FRS.
Lancashire FS	Since 1998 administered by CFA of Lancashire County and Blackburn with Darwen and Blackpool borough councils. Name changed to Lancashire FRS.
Leicestershire FS	Since 1997 administered by a CFA of Rutland, Leicestershire County and Leicester City councils. Name changed to Leicestershire FRS.
Lincolnshire FS	Name changed to Lincolnshire FRS.
London FB	Was not affected by 1974 reorganisations; administered by the Greater London Council until its abolition in 1986, the London Fire and Civil Defence Authority 1986 - 2000 and by the London Fire and Emergency Planning Authority since 2000.
Merseyside County FB	Was administered by Merseyside County Council until its abolition in 1986, afterwards administered by the Merseyside Fire and Civil Defence Authority, which was renamed South Yorkshire Fire and Rescue Authority. Name of the service itself changed to Merseyside FRS.
Norfolk FS	Name changed to Norfolk FRS.
North Yorkshire FS	Since 1996 administered by a CFA of North Yorkshire County and York City councils. Name changed to North Yorkshire FRS.
Northamptonshire FB	Name changed to Northamptonshire FRS.
Northumberland FB	Name changed to Northumberland FRS.
Nottinghamshire FS	Since 1998 administered by a CFA of Nottingham City and Nottinghamshire County councils. Name changed to Nottinghamshire FRS.
Oxfordshire FS	Name changed to Oxfordshire FRS.
Salop FS	Renamed Shropshire FS 1980, since 1998 administered by Shropshire and Wrekin Fire and Rescue Authority. Later renamed Shropshire FRS.
Somerset FB	Merged into Devon and Somerset FRS in 2007.
Staffordshire FS	Administered by Stoke-on-Trent and Staffordshire Fire Authority since 1997. Name changed to Staffordshire FRS.
South Yorkshire FS	Was administered by South Yorkshire County Council until its abolition in 1986, afterwards administered by the South Yorkshire Fire and Civil Defence Authority, which was renamed South Yorkshire Fire and Rescue Authority in 2004. Name of the service itself changed to South Yorkshire FRS.
Suffolk FS	Name changed to Suffolk FRS.
Surrey FS	Name changed to Surrey FRS.
Tyne and Wear Metropolitan FB	Was administered by Tyne and Wear County Council until its abolition in 1986, afterwards administered by Tyne and Wear Fire and Rescue Authority. Name of the service itself was changed to Tyne and Wear FRS.
Warwickshire FS	Name changed to Warwickshire FRS.
West Midlands FS	Was administered by the West Midlands County Council until its abolition in 1986, afterwards administered West Midlands Fire and Rescue Authority.
West Yorkshire FS	Was administered by the West Yorkshire County Council until its abolition in 1986, afterwards administered by the West Yorkshire Fire and Civil Defence Authority, which was renamed West Yorkshire Fire and Rescue Authority in 2005. Name of the service itself was changed to West Yorkshire FRS.
West Sussex FB	Name changed to West Sussex FRS.
Wiltshire FS	Since 1998 administered by Wiltshire and Swindon Fire Authority. Name changed to Wiltshire FRS.

== Fire brigades in Wales ==
=== 1948–1974 ===
Brigade	Notes	Fate in the 1974 reorganisation
Anglesey FB		Merged to form part of Gwynedd FS
Breconshire and Radnorshire FB	Combined brigade for two administrative counties	Split between Gwent FS and Powys FS,
Caernarvonshire FB		Formed part of Gwynedd FS
City of Cardiff FB		Formed part of South Glamorgan FS
Carmarthenshire and Cardiganshire FB	Combined brigade for two administrative counties	Formed part of Dyfed FS
Denbighshire and Montgomeryshire FB	Combined brigade for two administrative counties	Split between Clwyd FS and Gwynedd FS
Flintshire FB		Formed part of Clwyd FS
Glamorgan FB		Split between Mid, South and West Glamorgan FS's
Merionethshire FB		Formed part of Gwynedd FS
Merthyr Tydfil County Borough FB		Formed part of Mid Glamorgan FS
Monmouthshire FB		Formed part of Gwent FS
Newport County Borough FB		Formed part of Gwent FS
Pembrokeshire FB		Formed part of Dyfed FS
Swansea County Borough FB		Formed part of West Glamorgan FS

=== 1974–1996 ===
From 1974 each of the new county councils maintained a separate fire brigade.

Brigade	1996
Clwyd FS	North Wales FRS
Dyfed FB	Mid and West Wales FRS
Gwent FB	South Wales FRS
Gwynedd FS	North Wales FRS
Mid Glamorgan FS	South Wales FRS
Powys FS	Mid and West Wales FRS
South Glamorgan FS	South Wales FRS
West Glamorgan FB	Mid and West Wales FRS

=== 1996 onwards ===
The Local Government (Wales) Act 1994 replaced the eight counties with unitary authorities. The authorities are grouped into three areas for the provision of fire and rescue services. Fire services are administered by fire and rescue authorities consisting of councillors from each of the councils in the area.

Brigade	Principal areas
North Wales FS, renamed North Wales FRS	Anglesey, Conwy, Denbighshire, Flintshire, Gwynedd and Wrexham
Mid and West Wales FB, renamed Mid and West Wales FRS in 2003	Carmarthenshire, Ceredigion, Neath Port Talbot, Pembrokeshire, Powys and Swansea
South Wales FS renamed South Wales FRS 2004	Blaenau Gwent, Bridgend, Caerphilly, Cardiff, Merthyr Tydfil, Monmouthshire, Newport, Rhondda Cynon Taff, Torfaen and Vale of Glamorgan

== Fire brigades in Scotland ==
=== 1948–1975 ===
The first public fire service in the UK was founded in Edinburgh in 1824. Central government responsibility for fire brigades was handed to the Scottish Office and the Secretary of State for Scotland upon their creation in 1885. The 1947 Act also reorganised fire services in Scotland. Section 36 obliged county councils, corporations of counties of cities and town councils of large burghs to form combined fire brigades. Schedule 4 set the combined areas of the new brigades.

Name of combined area	Counties and burghs covered and represented in the CFA
Lanark	The county of Lanark and the burghs of Airdrie, Coatbridge, Hamilton, Motherwell and Wishaw, and Rutherglen.
Central	The counties of Clackmannan, Dunbarton and Stirling, and the burghs of Clydebank, Dumbarton, Falkirk and Stirling.
Western	The counties of Argyll, Bute and Renfrew, and the burghs of Greenock, Paisley and Port Glasgow.
South Western	The counties of Ayr, Dumfries, Kirkcudbright and Wigtown, and the burghs of Ayr, Dumfries and Kilmarnock.
South Eastern	The counties of Berwick, East Lothian, Midlothian, Peebles, Roxburgh, Selkirk and West Lothian, and the county of the city of Edinburgh.
Fife	The county of Fife and the burghs of Dunfermline and Kirkcaldy.
Perth and Kinross	The joint county of Perth and Kinross, and the burgh of Perth.
Angus	The county of Angus, the burgh of Arbroath and the county of the city of Dundee.
North Eastern	The counties of Aberdeen, Banff and Kincardine, and the joint county of Moray and Nairn, and the county of the city of Aberdeen.
Northern	The counties of Caithness, Inverness, Orkney, Ross and Cromarty, Sutherland and Zetland, and the burgh of Inverness.

The County of the City of Glasgow continued to maintain its own fire brigade, so that there were 11 brigades in all.

=== 1975–2013 ===
The Local Government (Scotland) Act 1973 reorganised local government from 1975. County councils and town councils were abolished, making regional or islands area councils the new fire authorities, except where a combined fire authority was present. Some of the new administrative areas were grouped, and eight brigades were formed in all. Minor name changes took place throughout the life of these brigades; "Northern" was changed to "Highlands and Islands" in 1983, "Central Region" became "Central Scotland" when local government was again reformed in 1996, and all brigades except Tayside and the Highlands and Islands eventually adopted the name "Fire and Rescue Service".

Brigade formed in 1975	Pre-1975 brigades	1975-1996 local government regions	1996-2013 local council areas
Central Region FB Renamed Central Scotland FB in 1996	Part of Central Area FB, part of Perth and Kinross FB, Bo'ness from South Eastern Area FB	Central Region	Stirling, Falkirk, Clackmannanshire
Dumfries and Galloway FB	Most of South Western Area FB	Dumfries and Galloway	Dumfries and Galloway
Fife FB	Identical to Fife Area FB	Fife	Fife
Grampian Region FB	Most of North Eastern Area FB	Grampian	Aberdeen City, Aberdeenshire, Moray
Lothian and Borders FB	South Eastern Area FB (less Bo'ness)	Lothian, Scottish Borders	City of Edinburgh, West Lothian, Midlothian, East Lothian, Scottish Borders
Northern FB Renamed Highland and Islands FB 1983 Changed to Highlands and Islands late 1990s.	Northern Area FB, part of North Eastern Area FB	Highland, Orkney, Shetland, Western Isles	Highland, Orkney, Shetland, Western Isles
Strathclyde FB	City of Glasgow, Lanark Area FB, part of Central Area FB, part of South Western Area FB, part of Western Area FB	Strathclyde	Argyll and Bute, East Ayrshire, East Dunbartonshire, East Renfrewshire, Glasgow City, Inverclyde, North Ayrshire, North Lanarkshire, Renfrewshire, South Ayrshire, South Lanarkshire, West Dunbartonshire
Tayside FB	Angus Area FB, most of Perth and Kinross FB	Tayside	Perth and Kinross, Dundee City, Angus

=== Since 2013 ===
Under the terms of the Police and Fire Reform (Scotland) Act 2012, the eight regional services were replaced by a single Scottish Fire and Rescue Service for the whole of Scotland, with effect from 1 April 2013. The Scottish Fire and Rescue Service has its headquarters in Cambuslang (having initially been based in Perth).

== Fire brigades in Northern Ireland ==
As in Great Britain, there were numerous local authority fire brigades in Northern Ireland until the Second World War. On 1 March 1942 all brigades were nationalised by the Fire Services (Emergency Provisions) Act (Northern Ireland) 1942 (6 & 7 Geo. 6. c. 5 (N.I.)) as the National Fire Service (Northern Ireland).

On 1 January 1948, the Fire Services Act (Northern Ireland) 1947 (c. 10 (N.I.)) came into effect. This provided for the establishment of four brigades in the province:

- Belfast Fire Brigade
- Northern Fire Authority, based in Ballymena
- Southern Fire Authority, based in Portadown
- Western Fire Authority, based in Derry

=== Northern Ireland Fire Brigade 1950–2006 ===
The three regional brigades were short-lived and on 1 January 1950 they were amalgamated into the Northern Ireland Fire Authority.

In 1973, the Belfast Fire Brigade and NIFA were amalgamated into a single Fire Authority for Northern Ireland.

=== Northern Ireland Fire and Rescue Service ===
On 1 July 2006, the fire authority was replaced with a Northern Ireland Fire and Rescue Service Board, with the brigade adopting the title Northern Ireland Fire and Rescue Service.

== See also ==
- Fire Service in the UK
- Local Government Acts
- Salvage Corps
- Women in firefighting
- History of law enforcement in the United Kingdom
- Fire insurance mark
