= Dumfries and Galloway Fire and Rescue Service =

Operational area
- Country: Scotland

Agency overview
- Established: 1975

Facilities and equipment
- Stations: 17

Website
- Official website

Dumfries and Galloway Fire and Rescue Service was the statutory fire and rescue service for the area of Dumfries and Galloway, Scotland. It was amalgamated into the single Scottish Fire and Rescue Service in 2013.

== Stations and Units ==
When disbanded, the service had 17 fire stations in operation, a combination of part-time, whole-time and both whole-time and retained combined. These included:

- One station covered by whole-time and retained
- 15 stations covered by part-time staff
- One Auxiliary unit located at Drummore

When disbanded, the service had 29 fire appliances which covered the whole area of Dumfries and Galloway:

- 21 Fire and rescue appliances (FRT)
- 1 Major Rescue Vehicle (MRV)
- 1 Incident Support Unit (ISU)
- 2 Combined Aerial Rescue Pumps (CARP)
- 1 Incident control unit (ICU)
- 2 Prime mover appliances (PM)
- 2 Decontamination units
- 1 Urban search and rescue unit
- 1 Auxiliary firefighting unit

In addition the service had two FRTs involved with their training department and five as reserve appliances.

== Amalgamation in 2013 ==
Dumfries and Galloway Fire and Rescue Service, along with the other seven fire and rescue services across Scotland, was amalgamated into a single, new Scottish Fire and Rescue Service on 1 April 2013. This replaced the previous system of eight regional fire and rescue services across Scotland which existed since 1975. The Scottish Fire and Rescue Service has its headquarters in Perth.

== Regional Fire and Rescue Services in Scotland 1975-2013 ==
The following eight regional fire and rescue services (originally known as fire brigades) were merged on 1 April 2013, creating the Scottish Fire and Rescue Service:

- Central Scotland Fire and Rescue Service
- Dumfries and Galloway Fire and Rescue Service
- Fife Fire and Rescue Service
- Grampian Fire and Rescue Service
- Highlands and Islands Fire and Rescue Service
- Lothian and Borders Fire and Rescue Service
- Strathclyde Fire and Rescue Service
- Tayside Fire and Rescue Service

The same boundaries were also used for the eight territorial police forces, which were amalgamated into Police Scotland on 1 April 2013.

== See also ==
- FiReControl
- Fire apparatus
- Fire engine
- Scottish Fire and Rescue Service
- Fire
- Fire and Rescue Authority (Scotland)
- History of Fire Brigades in Scotland
