= Central Scotland Fire and Rescue Service =

Operational area
- Country: Scotland
- Region: Central

Agency overview
- Established: 1975
- Employees: 3,562

Facilities and equipment
- Stations: 17

Website
- www.centralscotlandfire.gov.uk

Central Scotland Fire and Rescue Service was the statutory fire and rescue service for the area of Central Scotland, Scotland between 1975 and 2013. It was amalgamated into the single Scottish Fire and Rescue Service in 2013.

== History ==
Central Scotland Fire and Rescue Service was formed in 1975 when control of fire services was passed from local authorities to the Central Region Council. When the Central Regional Council was abolished in 1996 the three new unitary authorities each took part in the running of the service.

Originally called Central Region Fire Brigade in 1975, changed in 1996 to Central Scotland Fire Brigade, and in 2004 it changed to Central Scotland Fire and Rescue Service to reflect the change in the operations it carried out.

Central Scotland Fire and Rescue Service, along with the other seven fire and rescue services across Scotland, was amalgamated into a single, new Scottish Fire and Rescue Service on 1 April 2013. This replaced the previous system of eight regional fire and rescue services across Scotland which existed since 1975. The Scottish Fire and Rescue Service had its headquarters in Perth.

== Stations ==
The service operated 17 fire stations.

| Area | Population | Full-time station | Retained station | Volunteer Stations |
|---|---|---|---|---|
| Clackmannanshire | 48,630 | 1 | 1 | 0 |
| Falkirk | 149,150 | 3 | 2 | 0 |
| Stirling | 86,930 | 1 | 9 (7) | 0 (2) |

- One Wholetime Station: Stirling.
- Four Mixed Wholetime/Retained Stations: Alloa, Bo'ness, Falkirk and Larbert.
- Twelve Retained Stations: Aberfoyle, Balfron, Bridge of Allan, Callander, Denny, Doune, Dunblane, Killin, Slamannan, Tyndrum, Crianlarich and Tillicoultry.
- No volunteer stations.

== Appliances ==
Central Scotland Fire and Rescue Service had a total of 34 fire appliances which cover the whole area of Stirling, Falkirk and Clackmannanshire. The majority of these are water tender ladder and the remainder were mostly specialist units:

- 17 Water tender Ladders
- 5 Water Tenders
- 2 Light Fire Appliances – (changed from VSU as unit are no longer volunteers)
- 1 Rescue Tender
- 1 Operational Support Unit
- 2 Fire Fogging Units
- 1 Water Carrier
- 1 Aerial Ladder Platforms
- 1 Prime Mover + High Volume Pump, Hose pod & Environmental Pod
- 1 Incident Response Unit
- 1 Command Unit
- 1 Fire Investigation Unit
- 1 Water Rescue Unit
- 1 Emergency Firefighting Appliance Driving Training Vehicle
- Urban Search and Rescue Team – USAR + USAR pod

== Regional Fire and Rescue Services in Scotland 1975-2013 ==
The following eight regional fire and rescue services (originally known as fire brigades) were merged on 1 April 2013, creating the Scottish Fire and Rescue Service:

- Central Scotland Fire and Rescue Service
- Dumfries and Galloway Fire and Rescue Service
- Fife Fire and Rescue Service
- Grampian Fire and Rescue Service
- Highlands and Islands Fire and Rescue Service
- Lothian and Borders Fire and Rescue Service
- Strathclyde Fire and Rescue Service
- Tayside Fire and Rescue Service

The same boundaries were also used for the eight territorial police forces, which were amalgamated into Police Scotland on 1 April 2013.

== See also ==
- Blues and twos
- Fire Services in Scotland
- FireControl
- Fire apparatus
- Fire engine
- Fire
- Fire and Rescue Authority (Scotland)
