= Lothian and Borders Fire and Rescue Service =

Operational area
- Country: Scotland
- Region: Lothian and Borders

Agency overview
- Employees: 1294
- Chief Fire Officer: Jimmy Campbell

Facilities and equipment
- Stations: 36

Website
- Official website

Lothian and Borders Fire and Rescue Service was a Local Authority fire and rescue service covering an area of 2,500 square miles (6,500 km^{2}) of south east Scotland, and serving a total population of 890,000. It was amalgamated into the single Scottish Fire and Rescue Service in April 2013.

It was the oldest municipal fire brigade in the UK and the world, founded in 1824 under the leadership of James Braidwood, who later went on to establish the London Fire Brigade.

The last Chief Officer, Jimmy Cambell, started his career as a Fireman with the Service in 1975, before moving to other Services through promotion. He returned as its Chief Officer in April 2010.

== Amalgamation in 2013 ==
Lothian and Borders Fire and Rescue Service, along with the other seven fire and rescue services across Scotland, was amalgamated into a single, new Scottish Fire and Rescue Service on 1 April 2013. This replaced the previous system of eight regional fire and rescue services across Scotland which had existed since 1975. The Scottish Fire and Rescue Service has its headquarters in Cambuslang.

== Stations ==
The Lothian & Borders Service had a total of 36 operational fire stations, separated into 11 groups, with each covering a different area of Lothian and Borders.

Until March 2013 there were:

- 20 Retained only fire stations
- 9 Wholetime only stations
- 3 Day Shift Duty System (DSDS) stations (wholetime cover on weekdays, retained cover at night and weekends)
- 3 Wholetime and retained stations
- 1 Wholetime & DSDS station

Headquarters were located at Lauriston Place in Edinburgh, which also housed The Museum of Fire until 2016. It had separate training and Logistical Support Centres at Goldenacre and Newbridge.

== Regional Fire and Rescue Services in Scotland 1975–2013 ==
The following eight regional fire and rescue services (originally known as fire brigades) were merged on 1 April 2013, creating the Scottish Fire and Rescue Service:

- Central Scotland Fire and Rescue Service
- Dumfries and Galloway Fire and Rescue Service
- Fife Fire and Rescue Service
- Grampian Fire and Rescue Service
- Highlands and Islands Fire and Rescue Service
- Lothian and Borders Fire and Rescue Service
- Strathclyde Fire and Rescue Service
- Tayside Fire and Rescue Service

The same boundaries were also used for the eight territorial police forces, which were amalgamated into Police Scotland on 1 April 2013.

== See also ==
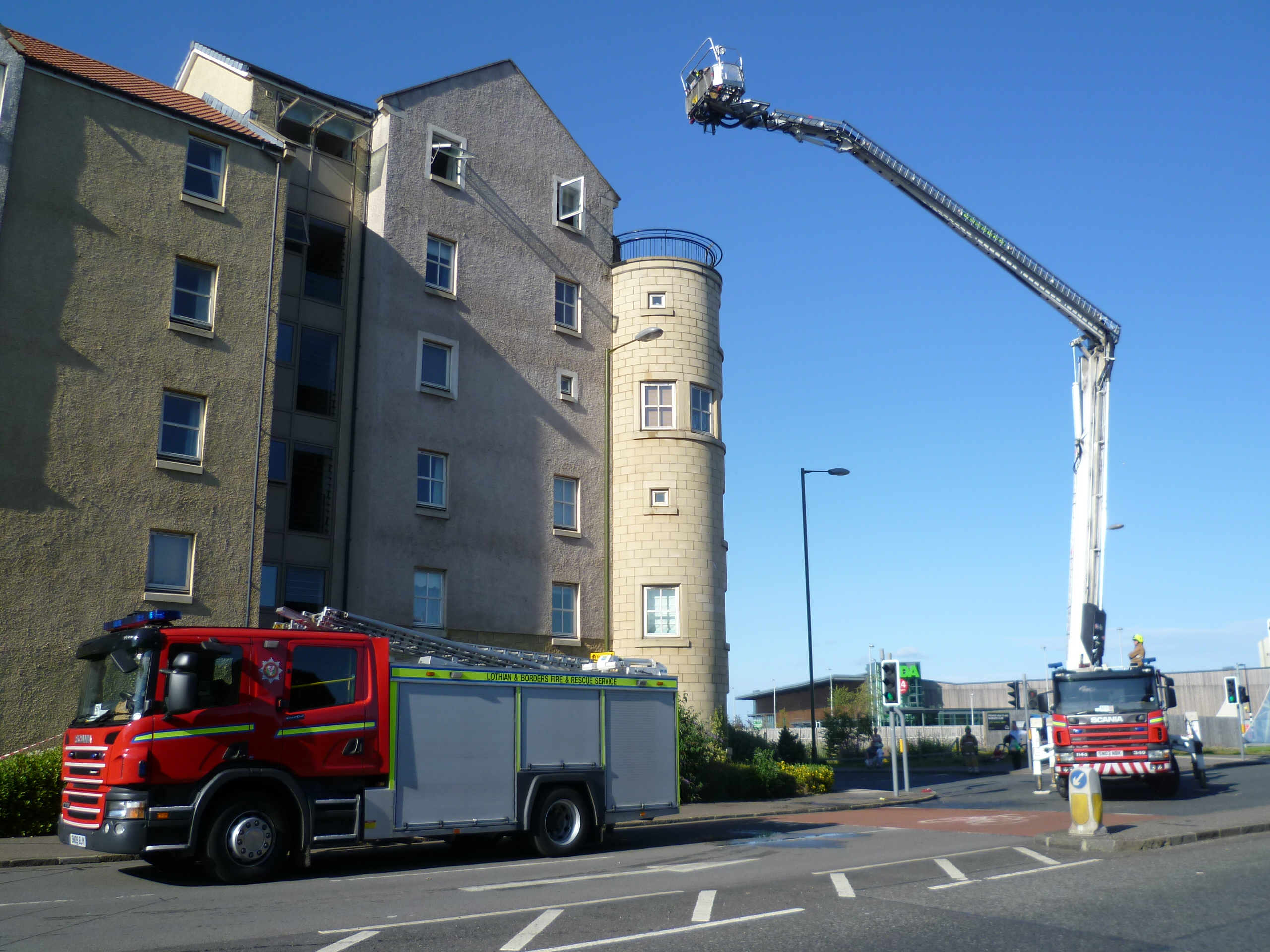
Attending an emergency at Newhaven in 2011

- Fire Services in Scotland
- FiReControl
- Fire apparatus
- Fire engine
- Fire
- Fire and Rescue Authority (Scotland)
