= Alasdair Hay =

Scottish firefighter (born 1961)

Alasdair Hay CBE QFSM

Chief Fire Officer Scottish Fire and Rescue Service
- In office October 2013 – February 2019
- Succeeded by: Martin Blunden

Personal details
- Born: 24 December 1961 (age 64) Edinburgh, Scotland
- Occupation: Fire fighter

Alasdair George Hay, CBE, QFSM (born 24 December 1961) is a Scottish firefighter. He was the first Chief Fire Officer of the Scottish Fire and Rescue Service.

== Early life ==
Hay was born on 24 December 1961 in Edinburgh, Scotland.

== Career ==
Hay was a firefighter with Essex County Fire and Rescue Service from September 1983 to October 1992. He was a senior instructor at the Scottish Fire Services College from 1992 to 1994. In 1994, he joined Tayside Fire and Rescue Service. By 2009, he had risen to the rank of Deputy Chief Fire Officer. Between May 2011 and March 2012, he was seconded to the Scottish Fire and Rescue Service Advisory Unit. Returning to the Tayside Fire and Rescue Service, he was appointed acting chief fire officer on 1 April 2012.

Hay was appointed chief fire officer of the newly created Scottish Fire and Rescue Service in October 2013 to prepare for the new nationwide service. He oversaw a workforce of more than 9,000 firefighters and support staff. Hay retired from the Scottish Fire and Rescue Service on 15 February 2019, handing over to the current chief fire officer, Martin Blunden.

== Honours ==

In the 2011 Queen's Birthday Honours, Hay was awarded the Queen's Fire Service Medal (QFSM) for Distinguished Service. He is a recipient of the Queen Elizabeth II Golden Jubilee Medal, the Queen Elizabeth II Diamond Jubilee Medal and the Fire Brigade Long Service and Good Conduct Medal. He was appointed Commander of the Order of the British Empire (CBE) in the 2017 Birthday Honours.
