= Highlands and Islands Fire and Rescue Service =

UK fire department

Operational area
- Country: United Kingdom
- Country: Scotland

Agency overview
- Employees: ~1,600
- Chief Fire Officer: Stewart Edgar

Facilities and equipment
- Stations: 101

Website
- Official website

The Highlands & Islands Fire & Rescue Service (previously Highland and Islands Fire Brigade) was the statutory fire and rescue service for northern Scotland, covering the council areas of Highland, Orkney, Shetland, and the Western Isles, and so covering a major part of the Highlands and Islands area. It was the fire service covering the largest geographical area in the United Kingdom (its area being roughly equivalent in size to Belgium), and had its headquarters in the city of Inverness. It was established in 1975 and was amalgamated into the single Scottish Fire and Rescue Service in 2013.

== History ==
This Fire Service stemmed from the Northern Area Fire Brigade, formed in 1947 after the passing of the Fire Services Act, and covered the same area the service did until 2013, excluding the Western Isles. In 1975, with the reorganisation of local government, the service became the Northern Fire Brigade and gained the Western Isles as part of its area. In 1983 the name changed again, to Highland and Islands Fire Brigade, to more accurately reflect the area which the Brigade served. The final name, Highlands and Islands Fire and Rescue Service, was adopted in summer 2005, under the Fire (Scotland) Act 2005. As well as the name change, for the first time in the service's history, a Gaelic motto, dìon is freagair, or "protect and respond", was sanctioned.

The Chief Fire Officer before amalgamation was Stewart James Edgar. Edgar was awarded the Queens Fire Service Medal for Distinguished Service in the Queen's Birthday Honours in 2013.

=== Amalgamation in 2013 ===
The Highlands and Islands Fire and Rescue Service, along with the other seven fire and rescue services across Scotland, was amalgamated into a single, new Scottish Fire and Rescue Service on 1 April 2013. This replaced the previous system of eight regional fire and rescue services across Scotland which existed since 1975. The Scottish Fire and Rescue Service has its headquarters in Perth.

== Stations ==
before the amalgamation to a national service took place, HIFRS operated 96 stations throughout the Highlands and Islands, with Inverness being the only wholetime station. Eighty-eight stations were retained and 12 operated as "Community Response Units". All the service's stations were supported locally by district offices, which supervised the operations of the stations in their respective areas. These offices were located in Inverness, Aviemore, Fort William, Invergordon, Ullapool, Dornoch, Portree, Thurso, Stornoway, Benbecula, Kirkwall, and Lerwick. Inverness was also the location of the main headquarters, which was situated next to the city's fire station.

== Training facility ==
The service also had a training facility based 25 miles north of Inverness in Invergordon, as well as a state of the art control centre, which again was based in the Highland capital, but on a different site from the main headquarters.

== Regional Fire and Rescue Services in Scotland 1975-2013 ==
The following eight regional fire and rescue services (originally known as fire brigades) were merged on 1 April 2013, creating the Scottish Fire and Rescue Service:

- Central Scotland Fire and Rescue Service
- Dumfries and Galloway Fire and Rescue Service
- Fife Fire and Rescue Service
- Grampian Fire and Rescue Service
- Highlands and Islands Fire and Rescue Service
- Lothian and Borders Fire and Rescue Service
- Strathclyde Fire and Rescue Service
- Tayside Fire and Rescue Service

The same boundaries were also used for the eight territorial police forces, which were amalgamated into Police Scotland on 1 April 2013.

== See also ==
- Scottish Fire and Rescue Service
- Fire and rescue authority (Scotland)
