= Aberdeen Safer Community Trust =

Aberdeen Safer Community Trust (Absafe) is an Aberdeen, Scotland based community safety charity. It was established in 1997, taking over from the local authority Safer Cities Project. It promotes a partnership approach to community safety issues.

== About ==
Absafe is dedicated to helping community groups across the whole of Aberdeen to turn their community safety ideas into action. They help with setting up Neighbourhood watch programmes, youth diversion projects, safety items, risk awareness campaigns and can also provide funding. The trust is partly sponsored by the public sector and also raises funds by organising fundraisers and sponsored events. Absafe is able to award grants to community safety schemes of up to £3,000. It works in close cooperation with Aberdeen City Council, Grampian Police, Grampian Fire and Rescue Service and the Grampian Neighbourhood Watch Association.

== Mission ==
Absafe is committed to making Aberdeen a safer place. They use different initiatives and their main aims are to reduce crime, deal with anti-social behaviour, encourage safe driving, and promote accident prevention and home safety. The biggest project the charity is involved in to date is the Risk Ready campaign. Its aim is to build a £4.5 million pound high-tech interactive village, which will provide an experimental way to learn about safety and citizenship, with the ultimate goal of preventing and reducing crime and injuries and improving the quality of life in the North East of Scotland. Other initiatives the trust is involved in include - the Safe2Work Project in partnership with Foyer, Older & Wiser, Neighbourhood Watch.

== Notable achievements ==
Aberdeen Safer Community Trust has been awarded four awards to date:

- Best Partner in Community Safety - 2009 - Association of Scottish Neighbourhood Watches - Neighbourhood Watch Service
- Membership of Fundraising Standards Board - 2007-2010 - FSB - Aberdeen Safer Community Trust
- Silver Award for Home Safety - 2006 - Scottish Accident Prevention Council - Older & Wiser
- Aberdeen Champion - 2003 - Evening Express - Doug Duthie, Trust Co-ordinator
