= Fife Fire and Rescue Service =

Fire department in Fife, Scotland

Operational area
- Country: Scotland
- Region: Fife

Agency overview
- Established: 1985

Facilities and equipment
- Stations: 14

Website
- www.fifefire.gov.uk

Fife Fire and Rescue Service was the statutory fire and rescue service for the area of Fife, Scotland. It was amalgamated into the single Scottish Fire and Rescue Service in 2013.

== History ==
Fife Fire and Rescue Service was formed in 1985 from Fife Fire Brigade, however its creation was a result of the Fire Services Act 1947. The service operated as a whole and was not divided into separate divisions as is the case with some fire services in the United Kingdom. FFRS provided fire cover to a large rural area; many stations are retained as there is no need to operate a fully staffed fire station in rural areas.

== Amalgamation in 2013 ==
Fife Fire and Rescue Service, along with the other seven fire and rescue services across Scotland, was amalgamated into a single, new Scottish Fire and Rescue Service on 1 April 2013. This replaced the previous system of eight regional fire and rescue services across Scotland which existed since 1975. The Scottish Fire and Rescue Service originally had its headquarters in Perth.

== Stations ==
The service operated 14 fire stations, both wholetime and retained (on-call), divided as follows:

- Eight retained fire stations:
  - Anstruther
  - Auchtermuchty
  - Burntisland
  - Cupar
  - Newburgh
  - St Andrews (plans to change St Andrews fire station to a day staffed station are being considered)
  - St Monans
  - Tayport
- Five wholetime stations:
  - Pitreavie
  - Glenrothes
  - Kirkcaldy
  - Lochgelly
  - Methil
- Fife FRS HQ was located in Thornton

== Regional Fire and Rescue Services in Scotland 1975-2013 ==
The following eight regional fire and rescue services (originally known as fire brigades) were merged on 1 April 2013, creating the Scottish Fire and Rescue Service:

- Central Scotland Fire and Rescue Service
- Dumfries and Galloway Fire and Rescue Service
- Fife Fire and Rescue Service
- Grampian Fire and Rescue Service
- Highlands and Islands Fire and Rescue Service
- Lothian and Borders Fire and Rescue Service
- Strathclyde Fire and Rescue Service
- Tayside Fire and Rescue Service

The same boundaries were also used for the eight territorial police forces, which were amalgamated into Police Scotland on 1 April 2013.

== See also ==
- Scottish Fire and Rescue Service
- FiReControl
- Fire apparatus
- Fire engine
- Fire
- Fire and rescue authority (Scotland)
