= Tayside Fire and Rescue Service =

Operational area
- Country: Scotland
- Region: Tayside

Agency overview
- Established: 1975
- Employees: 784
- Chief Fire Officer: Stephen Hunter

Facilities and equipment
- Stations: 24

Tayside Fire and Rescue Service was, between 1975 and 2013, the statutory fire and rescue service for the area of Tayside in Scotland. It was amalgamated into the single Scottish Fire and Rescue Service in 2013.

== Geographical Area ==
Tayside Fire and Rescue Service covers an area of 7,500 square kilometres, consisting predominantly of rural areas, but with urban centres in Dundee and Perth. The population of this area is 392,000 people. Within the service area there are two universities which increase the population of Dundee by approximately 23,000 for parts of the year. The economy has historically been based around journalism, manufacturing and sea-based industries. Whilst these are important, there has recently been an increase in research and development sectors. Tayside Fire and Rescue Service employs over 700 personnel. Of these 409 are operational wholetime firefighters, 236 are retained firefighters, and 24 volunteer firefighters. There are 21 members of the control room and 58 support staff. There are 24 stations located within the area. There are 4 wholetime stations, 2 wholetime/retained stations, and 15 are staffed through the retained duty system. There are also 3 stations that are staffed by volunteers. There is a fleet of 8 appliances, including urban search and rescue (USAR) equipment, and other specialist response and service delivery units and vehicles

=== History ===
On 16 May 1975, following local government reorganisation, Tayside Fire Brigade was formed from the Brigades of Angus Area Fire Brigade and Perth & Kinross Fire Brigade. The new brigade was now responsible for some 7,770 sq kilometres (3,000 sq miles) of area protecting a population in the region of 416,000.

The brigade was under the control of Tayside Regional Council until a further local government reorganisation in 1996, when it was placed back into the hands of Perth & Kinross Council, Angus Council and Dundee City Council. A joint Fire Board made up of representatives from all councils was then formed to administer the brigade.

With the introduction of the Fire (Scotland) Act in 2005 and the additional responsibilities it contained, the brigade changed its name to Tayside Fire and Rescue Service, to reflect the wider responsibility we now hold for rescue.

From the days of tin helmets and horse-drawn fire pumps,Tayside Fire and Rescue Service has grown and developed into a highly skilled and well equipped organisation which carries out, amongst others, the following duties:

- Community Fire Safety (Home Safety Checks. School Visits)
- Legislative Fire Safety (Offices, shops, hotels, care homes etc)
- Firefighting (From bonfires to buildings on fire)
- Mass Decontamination (After chemical spills or terrorist attacks)
- Road Traffic Emergencies (All types of vehicle collisions)
- Urban Search and Rescue (Rescue from collapsed structures)
- Hazardous Materials Incidents (Chemical spillages)
- Environmental Protection (Minimising pollution)
- Non–Fire Emergencies (Water incidents, persons trapped in machinery)

==== Amalgamation in 2013 ====
Tayside Fire and Rescue Service, along with the other seven fire and rescue services across Scotland, was amalgamated into a single, new Scottish Fire and Rescue Service on 1 April 2013. This replaced the previous system of eight regional fire and rescue services across Scotland which existed since 1975. The Scottish Fire and Rescue Service has its headquarters in Perth.

=== Executive Command ===
Tayside Fire and Rescue Service was led by Chief Fire Officer Stephen Hunter and managed through two functional heads: Service Delivery and Service Support. Mr Hunter liaises closely with the members of the Tayside Fire and Rescue Service Board who are responsible for providing direction for the organisation. His vision to "To provide the highest standard of fire safety and emergency response services to the communities we serve" is communicated throughout the organisation using all avenues available from, newsletters, core briefs, breakfast with the Chief, intranet etc.

Our Deputy Chief Fire Officer leads the Service Delivery business stream, overseeing Community Safety and Risk Management whilst driving forward the Prevention and Intervention Aims of the organisation. Service Delivery include the departments who interact frequently with the public providing them with an efficient emergency response and effective risk reduction advice.

Our Assistant Chief Fire Officer leads the Service Support business stream, overseeing Technical Services, Corporate Services and Personnel Services, whilst driving forward the People and Performance Aims of the organisation. These departments provide the expertise and resources which allow the service delivery departments to meet the needs of the people in the Tayside area.

The three members of the Executive Command and the five Heads of Departments form the policy making Management Team. The Management Team meet on a monthly basis when policy proposals are presented and debated before being introduced to the wider organisation

== Regional Fire and Rescue Services in Scotland 1975-2013 ==
The following eight regional fire and rescue services (originally known as fire brigades) were merged on 1 April 2013, creating the Scottish Fire and Rescue Service:

- Central Scotland Fire and Rescue Service
- Dumfries and Galloway Fire and Rescue Service
- Fife Fire and Rescue Service
- Grampian Fire and Rescue Service
- Highlands and Islands Fire and Rescue Service
- Lothian and Borders Fire and Rescue Service
- Strathclyde Fire and Rescue Service
- Tayside Fire and Rescue Service

The same boundaries were also used for the eight territorial police forces, which were amalgamated into Police Scotland on 1 April 2013.

== See also ==
- Scottish Fire and Rescue Service
- Fire and Rescue Authority (Scotland)
