= Local government areas of Scotland =

Local government areas covering the whole of Scotland were first defined by the Local Government (Scotland) Act 1889. As currently defined, they are a result, for the most part, of the Local Government etc. (Scotland) Act 1994.

The 1889 act created a country-wide system of local government based on pre-existing counties and burghs. Prior to this act burghs had their own elected local government councils but counties did not.

The county and burgh system was abolished by the Local Government (Scotland) Act 1973 and replaced by a system of regions and districts and single-tier islands council areas.

The 1994 act abolished the regions and districts and replaced them with a new system entirely composed of single-tier authorities; the Orkney, Shetland and Western Isles councils were continued by section 3 of the act in substantially unchanged form.

== 1889 to 1930 ==
Over this period local government in Scotland was based on three units: counties, burghs and parishes.

=== Counties ===
The Local Government (Scotland) Act 1889 reformed the administration of counties and also made alterations to their number and boundaries: Ross-shire and Cromartyshire were combined to form Ross and Cromarty; the Lower, Middle and Upper Wards of the County of Lanark, which formed separate counties for some purposes, were merged; and Orkney and Zetland were divided into distinct counties. A boundary commission was appointed, and between 1891 and 1892 many anomalies in county boundaries were rectified. In 1890 each of thirty-three counties was given a county council, partly elected, and partly co-opted by the town councils of burghs in the county. In effect the county council only exercised full powers in the "landward" areas of the county, outside of burgh boundaries.

==== Districts ====
County councils were required to divide their county into districts, each of which was under the supervision of a district committee with powers and duties independent of the county council in regard to highways and public health.

The district committee was composed of the county councillors elected for the area along with one representative from the parochial board of each parish in the district. Burgh councils could transfer the maintenance of the highways and bridges of the town to the county council, whereupon a representative of the burgh was appointed to the committee. In counties with fewer than six parishes, the county council was not obliged to form districts.

=== Burghs ===
Burghs were a form of town government dating back to the 12th century. Originally created by charter, and mainly concerned with trading privileges, they had been reformed earlier in the 19th century. Legislation enacted in 1833 allowed the inhabitants of existing burghs to adopt a "police system" allowing for the paving, lighting, cleansing, watching, supplying with water, and improving of the town. A further act of Parliament, the Burgh Police (Scotland) Act 1833 (3 & 4 Will. 4. c. 46) could be adopted by any place with a population of 700 which thereupon became a "police burgh". Those burghs which had not adopted a police system were abolished in 1893. Burghs were largely autonomous, and when county councils were established they had a limited jurisdiction within burgh boundaries.

=== Counties of cities ===
The royal burgh of Edinburgh was, by virtue of various charters, a "county and city" and entirely outside the jurisdiction of Midlothian County Council. In 1893 Glasgow became a county of a city by local act of Parliament, the County of the City of Glasgow Act 1893 (56 & 57 Vict. c. clxxxviii). Dundee followed with the Dundee Corporation Act 1894 (57 & 58 Vict. c. lxxiv) and Aberdeen with the Aberdeen Corporation Act 1899 (c. lx).

=== Parishes ===
The lowest tier of local government was the parish. Parochial boards had been established in 1845 for the administration of poor law, and, outside burghs, had gradually acquired various public health duties. In 1894 they were replaced with elected parish councils.

=== Education areas ===
In 1919 Scotland was divided into education areas. These consisted of the four counties of cities, the burgh of Leith and each of the local government counties. In the case of the counties, they were to include "every burgh situated therein". The education authorities were elected under proportional representation, and unlike the county councils, all members were directly elected.

== 1930 to 1975 ==
By 1928 Scotland had 1,298 different local authorities, many of them overlapping. In November the Scottish Office issued a bill to reform local government: this sought to abolish 1,064 of the various bodies, leaving only 33 county councils and 201 burgh councils. Burghs (other than the counties of cities) were to be divided into two classes: large burghs and small burghs. Large burghs were to gain considerable powers from the county councils. Small burghs, conversely, were to cede most of their duties to the county councils.

The original bill was altered in the course of passage through Parliament. In response to protests that the abolition of both parish councils and district committees left a gap in the system, the landward part of each county was to be divided into districts, governed by councils consisting partly of the county councillors for the area and partly of elected district councillors. The final act, the Local Government (Scotland) Act 1929 (19 & 20 Geo. 5. c. 25), also provided for the combination of a number of neighbouring small burghs, and paired Kinross-shire and Perthshire and Nairnshire and Moray into "combined counties". The individual counties and county councils continued to exist in these areas, but a joint county council became the principal local authority.

Following the changes, which came into effect in 1930, the following were the local government areas into which Scotland was divided:

- The four counties of cities
- 29 counties
- 2 combined counties
- Large burghs (those with a population of 20,000 or more, plus Arbroath)
- Small burghs
- Landward districts

This system was restated in the consolidating Local Government (Scotland) Act 1947 (10 & 11 Geo. 6. c. 43). The number of small burghs increased and the number of districts declined over the time period. Neither the 1929 or 1947 legislation contained a procedure by which a small burgh could become a large burgh on reaching sufficient population. Accordingly, only one new large burgh was formed at East Kilbride, which required the passing of a local act of Parliament, the East Kilbride Burgh Act 1967 (c. x).

== 1973 to 1996 ==
The Local Government (Scotland) Act 1973 created a system of nine two-tier regions and three single-tier islands council areas, and this system completely replaced local government counties and burghs in 1975.

Each two-tier region had a regional council and of a number of district subdivisions, each with its own district council. The number of districts in each region varied from three to 19.

The 1973 act was based closely on proposals in the Wheatley Report, produced by a Royal Commission into Scottish local government in 1969. The new regions and districts were generally very different from the counties and districts which they replaced.

Two of the new islands council areas had the boundaries of former counties. The third consisted of an area formerly divided between two counties.

== 1994 to present ==
Scotland's local government system experienced a major restructuring, following the enactment of the Local Government etc. (Scotland) Act 1994. Before the reform Scotland was divided into two tier structure of regions and districts. The act abolished this arrangement and from 1 April 1996, replaced it with 32 single tier councils areas, each responsible for delivering all local government services within its boundaries. As a result, the traditional local government areas that had served as subdivisions of Scotland were replaced by a more streamlined system of unitary authorities, creating the framework of local administration that is used to this day.

== Areas within the council areas ==
Two further kinds of area are defined within each of the 32 council areas. Neither is a local government area in its own right: the council area remains the unit for which local authority functions are exercised, while electoral wards divide it for the election of councillors and community council areas divide it for local representation.

=== Electoral wards ===
The Local Government etc. (Scotland) Act 1994 required each new council area to be divided into electoral wards, each of which returned one councillor, with a separate election for each ward. Wards on that pattern were used at the elections of 1995, 1999 and 2003.

The Local Governance (Scotland) Act 2004 kept the ward as the electoral unit but provided that each ward return three or four councillors, elected by preferential voting. The provision came into force on 2 May 2007 and the multi-member wards were first used at the local elections held the following day.

The rule has since been varied for areas with islands. Section 19 of the Islands (Scotland) Act 2018 allowed a ward consisting wholly or partly of one or more inhabited islands to return a smaller number of councillors than the general rule requires, and section 20 required the boundary commission to review the electoral arrangements of six named areas: Argyll and Bute, Comhairle nan Eilean Siar, Highland, North Ayrshire, Orkney Islands and Shetland Islands. The Scottish Elections (Reform) Act 2020 widened the general range to between two and five councillors a ward, provided that a ward consisting wholly or partly of an inhabited island may return one, and renamed the Local Government Boundary Commission for Scotland as Boundaries Scotland.

Ward boundaries are not set by those acts. They are proposed by Boundaries Scotland on review of a council area and given effect by regulations made by the Scottish Ministers under section 17 of the Local Government (Scotland) Act 1973.

=== Community council areas ===
Part IV of the Local Government (Scotland) Act 1973 required every local authority to submit a scheme for the establishment of community councils for its area, to be with the Secretary of State before 16 May 1976. The act confers no service functions on a community council; its general purpose is "to ascertain, co-ordinate and express to the local authorities for its area, and to public authorities, the views of the community which it represents, in relation to matters for which those authorities are responsible, and to take such action in the interests of that community as appears to it to be expedient and practicable". The council for the area may contribute towards a community council's expenses, lend it money and, if asked, provide it with staff, accommodation, vehicles and equipment.

Community council areas are therefore drawn locally rather than nationally, and cover a council area only so far as its scheme provides. A scheme follows public notice inviting suggestions "as to the areas and composition of the community councils", and the draft must contain a map showing the boundaries of the proposed areas and their populations together with the boundaries of any area for which the authority considers a community council unnecessary, and its reasons for that conclusion. Schemes in force before 1 April 1996 continued to have effect through the reorganisation of that date, and a council may revoke its scheme and make a new one by the same procedure.

Where a community council has been established, its boundaries carry consultation rights in planning. A prospective applicant for a national or major development must, before applying, consult "every community council any part of whose area is within or adjoins the land where the proposed development is situated", and a planning authority must send every community council in its district a weekly list of the applications it has received.
