= Town and country planning in Scotland =

Responsibility for the planning system in Scotland is shared between the Scottish Government and Local government in Scotland. Any new construction project, or projects that will alter the use, appearance, and other changes to the use of land of buildings in Scotland, is subject to planning permission under Scots law. Currently, the planning system in Scotland is made up of three main parts – Development Plans, Development Management, and Enforcement – each with varying processes.Strategic development plans

== National government policies ==
=== National planning guidelines ===
From 1974, to 1974, national planning guidelines, were initially published by the Scottish Development Department and later the Scottish Office Environment Department. They provided a strategic policy framework for Scottish local planning authorities.

=== National planning policy guidelines ===
Between 1991, the Scottish Office conducted a review of the national planning guidelines, leading to replacing them with the national planning policy guidelines in 1992. They broadly mirrored the planning policy guidance notes. They were replaced by the National Planning Framework in 2004.

=== Scottish planning policies ===
The Scottish Government issued a series of documents setting out individual policies concerning planning, known as "Scottish planning policies". This included Scottish Planning Policy 3: Planning for Housing, which encouraged local authorities to "better assess and identify" the need for housing in their areas, which was published in 2008.

=== Scottish Planning Policy ===
The Scottish Planning Policy was a document published by the Scottish Government, which consolidated guidance previously contained national planning policy guidelines and Scottish planning policies. It was first published in draft form in 2009, and in full form in 2010. It was updated from time to time.

A presumption in favour of sustainable development was contained in the 2014 version of the document.

It was replaced by National Planning Framework 4.

=== National Planning Framework ===
The National Planning Framework is the Scottish Government's national spatial planning document, under the Planning etc. (Scotland) Act 2006.

=== Regional spatial strategies ===
Under the Planning (Scotland) Act 2019, regional spatial strategies are regional planning policies which replaced strategic development plans. Local authorities do not consider them when developing their local development plans, but they do influence the National Development Framework.

== Strategic development planning authority policies ==
Under the Planning etc. (Scotland) Act 2006, strategic development planning authorities were four groups of local authorities centred around four city regions. This did not cover every local authority in Scotland. They were abolished by the Planning (Scotland) Act 2019.

=== Strategic development plans ===
Strategic development plans were intended to address cross-boundary issues.

Local authorities were required to consider strategic development plans when publishing their own local development plans.

The Scottish Government could approve or reject a strategic development plan.

Strategic development plans were replaced by regional spatial strategies.

== Local authority policies ==
=== Local development plans ===
During the development plans stage, consideration is given to protecting local amenities such as parks and wildlife, as well as thought being given to the best location for any new development in the area. It is expected the detailed information and plans will be included during this stage regarding any development happening within a reasonable timescale by providing information regarding how any development will be undertaken.

At present, Scots law places a requirement on local councils and national parks in Scotland to publish a development plan once every five years. The law in Scotland stipulates that development plans should be the starting point for any discussion and public consultation relating to any new construction project or alterations to buildings, land, or spaces. Local councils will receive the development plan by the project applicant, with a planning permission being granted, or refused, based on the information detailed within the development plan from the applicant.

=== Local place plans ===
Under the Planning (Scotland) Act 2019, local authorities can publish local place plans which can address broader issues such as climate change or inequality, to engage with the public, and inform planning policy.

== Stages ==
Current policy for the planning system in Scotland consists of three main components, namely development plans, development management, and enforcement. Development plans contain information for residents and businesses within local areas about any changes that are proposed to occur in the area in the near future by providing information relating to the type of changes and developments which would be expected to take place.

=== Development management ===
Development Management, the second component of the planning system in Scotland, is the system of granting or refusing planning permission for any project to be undertaken within Scotland. Local councils in Scotland each have authority to grant or refuse planning permission based on information received by the council from the applicant. Planning permission should be sought from the local council under Scots law, with the law stipulating that development of any kind – new build projects, engineering works, mining, or other operations conducted above or below ground in Scotland – is subject to planning permission. Planning permission is not required for any work an individual wishes to undertake within a building unless it is a listed building, then an applicant would require to receive a listed building consent notice to carry out any work within the building or grounds. Projects, such as some house extensions, are classed as a permitted development, and therefore do not require planning permission from the council, but applicants wishing to undertake any building works on their home property should check with their local authority to determine whether planning permission for the commencement of building works is needed.

Developments are grouped into three categories for the purposes of planning application processes – local, major or national – which allows local councils to treat each development submitted based on varying factors such as size, complexity, and consideration to other issues which may occur as a result of any development.

=== Enforcement ===
Each of Scotland's 32 local authorities have the ability to use enforcement procedures against any individual and project which has been carried out without planning permission, or where the project has not followed the conditions which were provided when the council granted the original planning permission. Not following the conditions attached to planning permission, or not applying for permission, is a breach of planning law. Each local authority has the ability to determine the course of action where this occurs. Local authorities may advocate for a "retrospective planning application" to be made for a project which would likely have received planning permission initially and would then consider the planning application like any other, or, they may ask an application for more details about a project before reaching any decision on whether to grant or refuse planning permission.

If local authorities ask an application for additional information relating to a project, they can serve a notice in order to halt the project if it is deemed that it has not been granted planning permission, or is not following the conditions set out in the planning permission. Should the development continue, local authorities can prosecute an individual or issue a fixed penalty notice. As a last resort, local authorities also have the ability to demolish any project that has been deemed to have been constructed or carried out illegally without appropriate planning permission being sought from the council. It is the responsibility for each of Scotland's local authority councils to publish a Planning Enforcement Charter to highlight how their enforcement process works and the councils role in the enforcement process within their local authority area.

== Planning permission ==
Most projects in Scotland require appropriate planning permission to be sought from local councils. Currently, the Scottish Government expects planning permission to be sought from applicants for:

- plans on constructing something new on a piece of land
- undertaking any major alteration to a building
- changing the use of a building
- for any building which is situated in a conservation area or a listed building

Planning application is not permitted to be sought from councils for smaller projects.

== Legal aspects of planning ==
Under Scots law, individuals submitting an application for planning permission is legally required to include information such as a description of the development, the name and address of the person applying, as well as their agent if they have one, a postal address of the land, or a description of the location of the land, a certificate of ownership accompanied by a notice to owners or tenants of agricultural holdings, a plan which clearly identifies the location of the application site, as well as any other plans and drawings needed to describe the proposed development along with the appropriate planning application fee as set by the local council. In some cases, applications may require extra information to assist local councils in the planning permission process, such as design and access statements. A comprehensive collection of looseleaf legal and administrative materials about planning is contained in the Scottish Planning Encyclopedia, general editors Lord Gill and Malcolm G. Thomson KC.

== Responsibility for planning ==
Each of Scotland's 32 local authority councils each have their own individual planning departments where planning applications are submitted by applicants for consideration. Additional bodies responsible for planning processes in Scotland include Planning Aid for Scotland and the Royal Town Planning Institute. Planning Aid for Scotland is an independent charity which has been established to help people with the planning application system in Scotland by providing free advice on planning for individuals and community groups who require to submit a planning application. The Royal Town Planning Institute is Scotland's professional body for planners, responsible for maintaining standards in Scottish building and construction projects.

== See also ==
- Scotland; the country in which the planning system applies
- Local government in Scotland; each of the local authority councils which are responsible for deciding on planning permission
- Scottish Government; the government of Scotland
- Politics of Scotland; the planning system is linked to the workings of Scotland's politics
