= Grampian Fire and Rescue Service =

Operational area
- Country: Scotland
- Region: Grampian

Agency overview
- Established: 1975

Facilities and equipment
- Stations: 39

Website
- Official website

Grampian region in Scotland

Grampian Fire and Rescue Service was the statutory fire and rescue service for the area of Grampian, Scotland from 1975 until 2013. It was amalgamated into the single Scottish Fire and Rescue Service in April 2013. The service provided emergency cover for residential areas, as well as providing it for a local industrial harbour, oil and gas terminals and a commonly used heliport.

== FRS area ==
Grampian Fire and Rescue Service covered the geographical areas of the Moray, Aberdeenshire Council, and Aberdeen City Council. The population served is around 530,000, rising to around 850,000 in the summer months and tourist seasons.

== Stations ==
The headquarters were located at 19 North Anderson Drive, Aberdeen, AB15 6DW. Additionally, there are five-full-time and over thirty part-time fire stations. Currently there are:

- 3 full-time stations in Aberdeen, one in Peterhead and one Elgin.
- Retained stations in 33 other towns/villages in the area.
- A volunteer unit at Gordonstoun School.

The Grampian Fire and Rescue Service was unusual in operating distinctive white painted fire engines. Other UK fire services operate red painted vehicles. The creation of the Scottish Fire and Rescue Service will lead to the gradual replacement of Grampian's vehicles with newer, red appliances.

== Amalgamation in 2013 ==
Grampian Fire and Rescue Service, along with the other seven fire and rescue services across Scotland, was amalgamated into a single, new Scottish Fire and Rescue Service on 1 April 2013. This replaced the previous system of eight regional fire and rescue services across Scotland which existed since 1975. The Scottish Fire and Rescue Service has its headquarters in Perth.

== Regional Fire and Rescue Services in Scotland 1975–2013 ==
The following eight regional fire and rescue services (originally known as fire brigades) were merged on 1 April 2013, creating the Scottish Fire and Rescue Service:

- Central Scotland Fire and Rescue Service
- Dumfries and Galloway Fire and Rescue Service
- Fife Fire and Rescue Service
- Grampian Fire and Rescue Service
- Highlands and Islands Fire and Rescue Service
- Lothian and Borders Fire and Rescue Service
- Strathclyde Fire and Rescue Service
- Tayside Fire and Rescue Service

The same boundaries were also used for the eight territorial police forces, which were amalgamated into Police Scotland on 1 April 2013.

== See also ==
- Fire Services in Scotland
- Fire apparatus
- Firefighter
- FiReControl
- Fire and Rescue Authority (Scotland)
