= Martin Blunden =

British firefighter (born 1968)

Martin Blunden QFSM

Chief Officer Scottish Fire and Rescue Service
- In office January 2019 – August 2022
- Preceded by: Alasdair Hay
- Succeeded by: Ross Haggart

Personal details
- Born: March 1968 (age 58)
- Occupation: Firefighter

Martin Blunden QFSM (born March 1968) is a British fire and rescue officer who served as Chief Officer of the Scottish Fire and Rescue Service (SFRS) from January 2019 until his retirement on September 1, 2022. He previously held senior positions in a number of fire services across the United Kingdom, including South Yorkshire, Hertfordshire, Hereford and Worcester and Buckinghamshire.

== Career ==
Blunden began his career in 1992 as a retained firefighter in Buckinghamshire Fire and Rescue Service, transitioning to full-time service by 1994. He rose through the ranks, serving in a number of operational and managerial roles, and later held posts in the UK National Resilience and Assurance Team, based at the Fire Services College where he was the Project Manager for high-volume pumping, water safety and water rescue, and Hereford & Worcester Fire where he was the Strategic Lead for Specialist Rescue.

Between 2003 and 2008, he was seconded to HM Government as part of the National Resilience Assurance Team, serving as Project Manager for Water Safety, Water Rescue, and High Volume Pumping and was awarded the International Higgins and Langley Award for his contribution to water rescue in the UK. In this capacity he helped coordinate the response to the Buncefield Oil Terminal fire and was twice recognised with the Deputy Prime Minister's Awards for Excellence in Delivery.

In 2008, he joined Hertfordshire Fire and Rescue Service, where he served as Head of Training and Development, ICT and Performance. During this period, he was also seconded to work on national-level initiatives with the Home Office and Chief Fire Officers Association (CFOA), contributing to the development of the Joint Emergency Services Interoperability Programme (JESIP) and supporting the delivery of the National Resilience Programme. He was the co-author of the original Joint Doctrine: The Interoperability Framework, establishing collaborative standards across emergency services following major UK incidents such as the 7/7 London bombings and the Derrick Bird shootings.

In 2015, Blunden was appointed Assistant Chief Fire Officer for South Yorkshire Fire and Rescue, later promoted to Deputy Chief Fire Officer in 2017. He established the National Operational Learning system for the National Fire Chiefs Council (NFCC). During this time, he led the adoption of real-time analytics platforms such as Power BI for performance monitoring and successfully negotiated workforce reforms and dispute resolutions with trade unions.

=== Scottish Fire and Rescue Service ===
In January 2019, Martin Blunden was appointed Chief Officer of the Scottish Fire and Rescue Service, taking over from Alasdair Hay. His tenure included oversight of SFRS during the COVID-19 pandemic.

In March 2022, Blunden was placed on formal leave amid an internal investigation into alleged misconduct, specifically related to bullying complaints raised by staff members. The Scottish Fire and Rescue Service confirmed the conduct investigation but did not release further details, citing confidentiality. He remained suspended with full pay during the inquiry.

Blunden left SFRS on 31 August 2022, stating that his departure was retirement. Media outlets noted that his departure followed several months of absence from public duties. His resignation prompted commentary from political figures, including Scottish Conservative MSPs, who raised concerns about transparency and internal culture within the organization.

In 2025, a broader ITV News investigation reported that over 20% of SFRS staff had experienced bullying or harassment, highlighting a wider cultural issue within the service.

== Honours and awards ==
- Queen's Fire Service Medal (QFSM) – Awarded in the 2021 New Year Honours for distinguished service to the fire and rescue profession.
- Deputy Prime Minister's Awards for Excellence in Delivery
- International Higgins & Langley Award
- Home Office Excellence in Delivery Award 2014
- Chief Fire Officers Association Recognition Award 2011
- Long Service and Good Conduct Medal 2012
