= Isle of Wight Fire and Rescue Service =

Former fire and rescue service on the Isle of Wight, United Kingdom

Operational area
- Country: England
- County: Isle of Wight

Agency overview
- Dissolved: 31 March 2021
- Employees: 242
- Chief Fire Officer: Neil Odin

Facilities and equipment
- Stations: 10 (1 Wholetime, 1 Day Crewed, 8 Retained)
- Engines: 14
- Platforms: 2

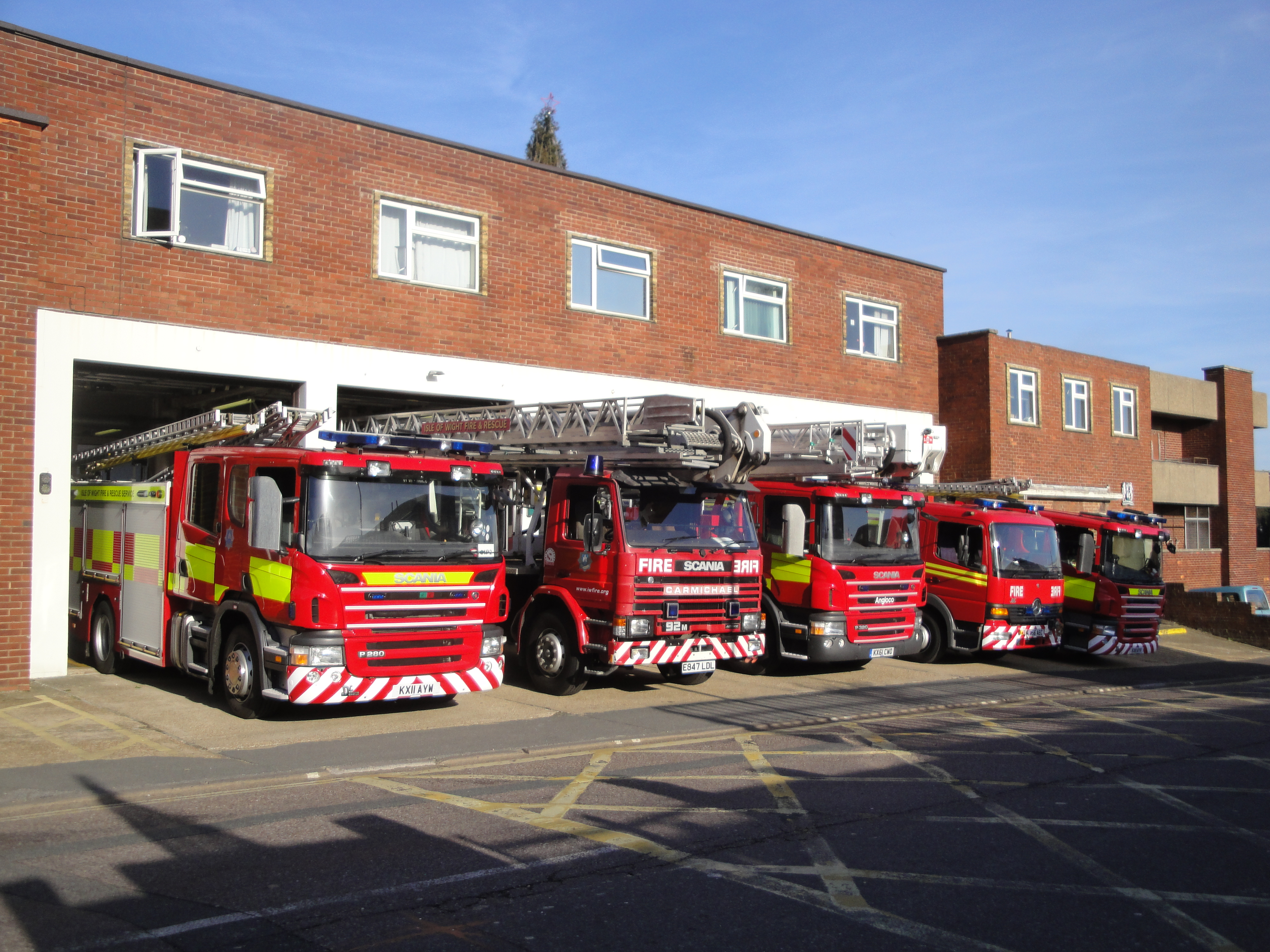
Various Fire Service Vehicles outside Newport station

Isle of Wight Fire and Rescue Service was the statutory fire and rescue service covering the Isle of Wight off the south coast of England. On 1 April 2021, it merged with Hampshire Fire and Rescue Service to form Hampshire & Isle of Wight Fire and Rescue Service (HIWFRS).

== Performance ==
In March 2007, the Isle of Wight Council voted to maintain the independence of the Isle of Wight Fire and Rescue service, instead of a merger with the Hampshire Fire and Rescue Service.

Later in February 2009, plans were announced for a three-year £8 million replacement programme changing part-time stations to full-time. The move would be done in an attempt to reduce response times to 999 alerts. It could see Ryde's fire station change to full-time, and possibly Sandown's, but part-time stations would continue to operate as normal in rural areas. The extra investment would also minimise chances of a future merger with Hampshire Fire and Rescue Service on the mainland. The decision was confirmed in October 2020, with a report showing stations were "considerably below" the standard of those on the mainland.

On a 2009 assessment by a government watchdog, the service was found to be performing well, getting a three star rating out of four, after a poor rating in 2005.

== Fire station ==
The Isle of Wight service had ten fire stations, one wholetime/retained, one day crew/retained and eight solely retained, prior to their merger into HIWFRS.

- Bembridge – retained
- Cowes – retained
- East Cowes – retained
- Freshwater – retained
- Newport – full-time/retained
- Ryde – day crewed/retained
- Sandown – retained
- Shanklin – retained
- Ventnor – retained
- Yarmouth – retained

== See also ==
- List of British firefighters killed in the line of duty
