= National Planning Framework (Scotland) =

Scottish Government spatial plan, 2004–present

The National Planning Framework is a statutory spatial development strategy for Scotland that is written and published by the Scottish Government. It is updated from time to time.

== Background ==
Before the National Planning Framework, the equivalent of a spatial plan had been National Planning Policy Guidelines, a document published by the Scottish Office, under the shared of planning law of Scotland.

The publication of a non-statutory National Planning Framework was a requirement under the Town and Country Planning (Scotland) Act 1997. The Planning etc. (Scotland) Act 2006 enabled the publication of a statutory National Planning Framework.

== Contents ==
The National Planning Framework defines what projects are considered "national developments".

NPF 2 and NPF 3 promoted cycling and walking transport infrastructure.

NPF 4 contains specific policies tying design and architecture to the wider goals of increasing biodiversity, achieving sustainable development and reaching net-zero emissions.

== Timeline ==
There have been four versions of the National Planning Framework that have been published as of 2026.

- National Planning Framework 1, published in April 2004
- National Planning Framework 2, published in January 2009 (published in draft form in 2008)
- National Planning Framework 3, published in June 2014
- National Planning Framework 4, published in February 2023 (published in draft form in 2021)
