= Hampshire and Isle of Wight Fire and Rescue Service =

Fire and rescue service in southern England

Operational area
- Country: England
- County: Hampshire; Isle of Wight
- Address: Eastleigh, SO50

Agency overview
- Established: 1 April 2021
- Annual calls: 21,010 (average annual incidents, 2020/21–2024/25)
- Employees: 1,500 (2026) including 1,110 firefighters, 40 fire control staff, 350 support staff
- Annual budget: £109.5 Million (2026–2027)
- Chief Fire Officer: Sabrina Cohen-Hatton

Facilities and equipment
- Stations: 59

Website
- www.hantsfire.gov.uk

The Hampshire and Isle of Wight Fire and Rescue Service (HIWFRS) is the statutory fire and rescue service for the county of Hampshire, including the cities of Southampton and Portsmouth, and the county of the Isle of Wight off the south coast of England. The service was formed on 1 April 2021 from the merger of Hampshire Fire and Rescue Service and the Isle of Wight Fire and Rescue Service. The service's chief fire officer is Sabrina Cohen-Hatton.

== History ==
=== Hampshire Fire Service ===
Until the Second World War, local towns had their own fire services run by parish or rural borough councils. In 1941, these were combined into the National Fire Service with Hampshire being served by fire forces 14 and 16. The Fire Services Act 1947 disbanded the National Fire Service and created county-level fire services with Hampshire Fire Service being formed in April 1948, inheriting 50 stations. Many meetings and discussions were held prior to the service's creation by the Hampshire County Council fire service committees, to discuss who would be appointed the role of Chief Fire Officer and how the service would be structured. The service would be divided into four districts (later divisions) lettered A-D and initially centred on Aldershot, Fareham, Winchester and Lyndhurst respectively.

Initially the service's headquarters were based at Litton Lodge in Winchester with the control room at the Winchester Fire Station although the service was originally hoping to use and acquire North Hill House, also in Winchester, for usage as the headquarters. North Hill House was still desired by the Admiralty however and it was only in May 1948 when the admiralty gave up the premises that freed the building to be used by the service as their headquarters and control room which they occupied on 20 September 1948. Twenty years later in 1968, the service headquarters and control room moved to a floor of the newly constructed Ashburton Court, Winchester, the headquarters of Hampshire County Council.

=== Hampshire Fire Brigade ===
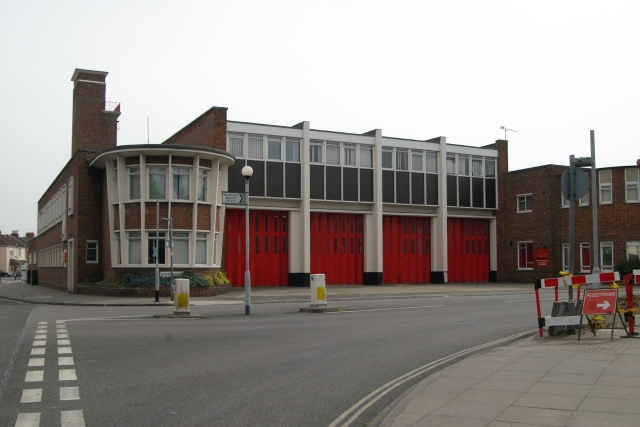
Copnor Fire Station, formerly part of the Portsmouth City Fire Brigade, became part of the new Hampshire Fire Brigade in 1974. The station closed permanently in October 2008 and was demolished 2014. Pictured here in 2007.

Following the passing of the Local Government Act 1972, some areas near Christchurch in the south west of Hampshire were ceded to Dorset and the cities of Southampton and Portsmouth became non-metropolitan districts. Subsequently, the newly renamed Hampshire Fire Brigade absorbed Southampton Fire Brigade's and Portsmouth City Fire Brigade's fire stations on 1 April 1974. Portsmouth became part of division B and the division headquarters moved to Copnor while Southampton became part of division D headquartered at Redbridge. Talks existed in 1973 of the Isle of Wight also merging at this point and becoming division E, however lobbying resulting in the island keeping their status as a county.

Since 1980, the service has occupied the former North End School building in Eastleigh with the site becoming home to the control centre, headquarters and training centre and fully completed in December 1984; the site was officially opened by Elizabeth II on 22 March 1985. Since 2015, the site has also been the headquarters of Hampshire Constabulary, the first shared police and fire headquarters in the country.

=== Hampshire Fire and Rescue Service ===
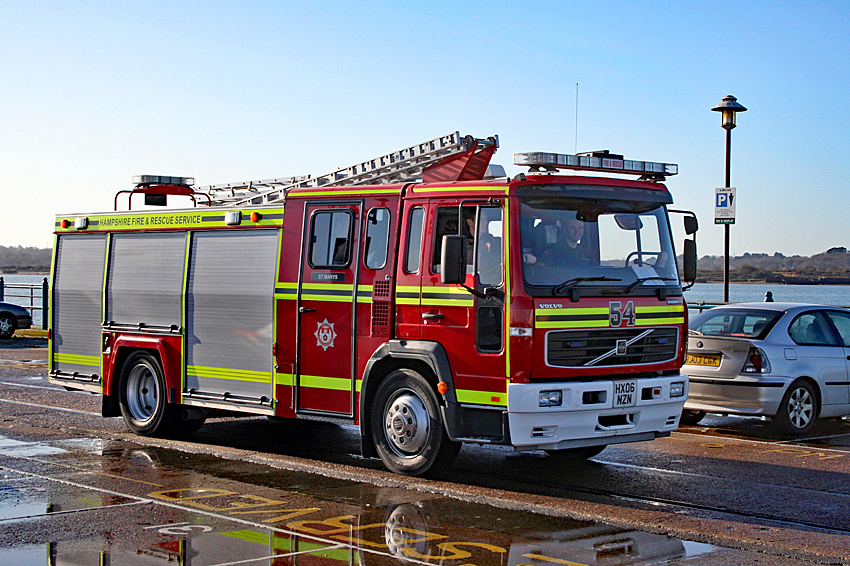
Hampshire Fire and Rescue fire engine on Town Quay, 2008

The service changed its name once again in September 1992 to Hampshire Fire and Rescue Service. On 1 April 1997, responsibility for the service was transferred from Hampshire County Council to the newly formed Hampshire Fire and Rescue Authority as local government changes created Southampton City Council and Portsmouth City Council as unitary authorities. The new Hampshire Fire and Rescue Authority was created so it could act as the combined authority for the three council areas and consisted of a board made up on councillors from all three councils proportional to the size of the area served.

A notable tragedy to affect the service during this time was the deaths of firefighters Jim Shears and Alan Bannon in the Shirley Towers fire on 6 April 2010. Following the period of austerity cuts from 2010, the service has had to reduce costs; this included a £16 million funding gap in the 2015-20 period. The authority's plan to address this while avoiding closing any fire station or issuing any compulsory redundancies included reducing the number of operational firefighters at stations, allowing some engines to respond to minor incidents with a smaller crew and introducing smaller engines at some stations. Initially the vision was for three types of fire engine: Enhanced Capability engines, which are similar in size to a traditional fire engine; Intermediate Capability appliances, which are slightly smaller; and First Response Capability appliances, which are much smaller. Following extensive vehicle trials, the decision was made to drop the First Response Capability appliance concept in 2019. The revised vehicle disposition is based on two types of appliance, the Enhanced and Intermediate Capability, now renamed Rescue Pump and Light Rescue Pump respectively.

=== Hampshire and Isle of Wight ===
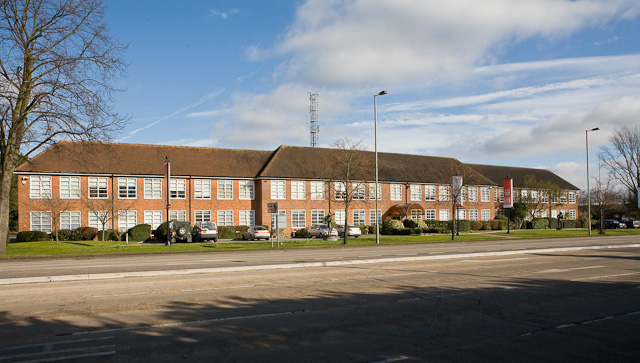
Headquarters of the Hampshire and Isle of Wight Fire and Rescue Service and Hampshire Constabulary in Eastleigh.

Since December 2014, the fire services of Hampshire and the Isle of Wight have been working together to enable both services to meet their objectives in an environment of reduced budgets. Set forward in the Delivering Differently in Partnership project, the partnership led to significant benefits to both fire services. This led on 21 February 2017 to both the Isle of Wight Council and the Hampshire Fire and Rescue Authority investigating expanding the current combined fire authority (consisting of Hampshire, Southampton and Portsmouth) to include the Isle of Wight. One of the key identified benefits for the Isle of Wight included transferring property and fleet liabilities to the new organisation which would otherwise need significant investment by the Isle of Wight Council, itself under financial pressure. Following a public consultation in 2018, the plan was approved in 2019 with the new authority set to launch on 1 April 2020 but as the decision to merge was only confirmed by the Home Office in early 2020, the date was pushed back to 2021.

On 1 April 2021 the Hampshire and Isle of Wight Fire and Rescue Service was created by merging the assets of both the Hampshire Fire and Rescue Service and the Isle of Wight Fire and Rescue Service; all fire stations and appliances were preserved in the merger and the way in which the two respond to emergencies is unchanged. The new badge, logo and branding for the new authority was completed by design company 1721 following feedback from staff and for the desire for a single identity for the new service where both elements had equal partnership. As part of the merger, the stations on the Isle of Wight are set for investment after a report by the shadow authority found they were "considerably below" the standards of the mainland.

== Performance ==
Every fire and rescue service in England and Wales is periodically subjected to a statutory inspection by His Majesty's Inspectorate of Constabulary and Fire & Rescue Services (HMICFRS). The inspections investigate how well the service performs in each of three areas. On a scale of outstanding, good, requires improvement and inadequate, the service was rated as follows:

HMICFRS Inspections
Area	Hampshire Rating 2018/19	IoW Rating 2018/19	Hampshire & IoW Rating 2021/22	Description
Effectiveness	Good	Good	Good	How effective is the fire and rescue service at keeping people safe and secure from fire and other risks?
Efficiency	Good	Good	Requires improvement	How efficient is the fire and rescue service at keeping people safe and secure from fire and other risks?
People	Requires improvement	Requires improvement	Requires improvement	How well does the fire and rescue service look after its people?

== Fire stations and appliances ==
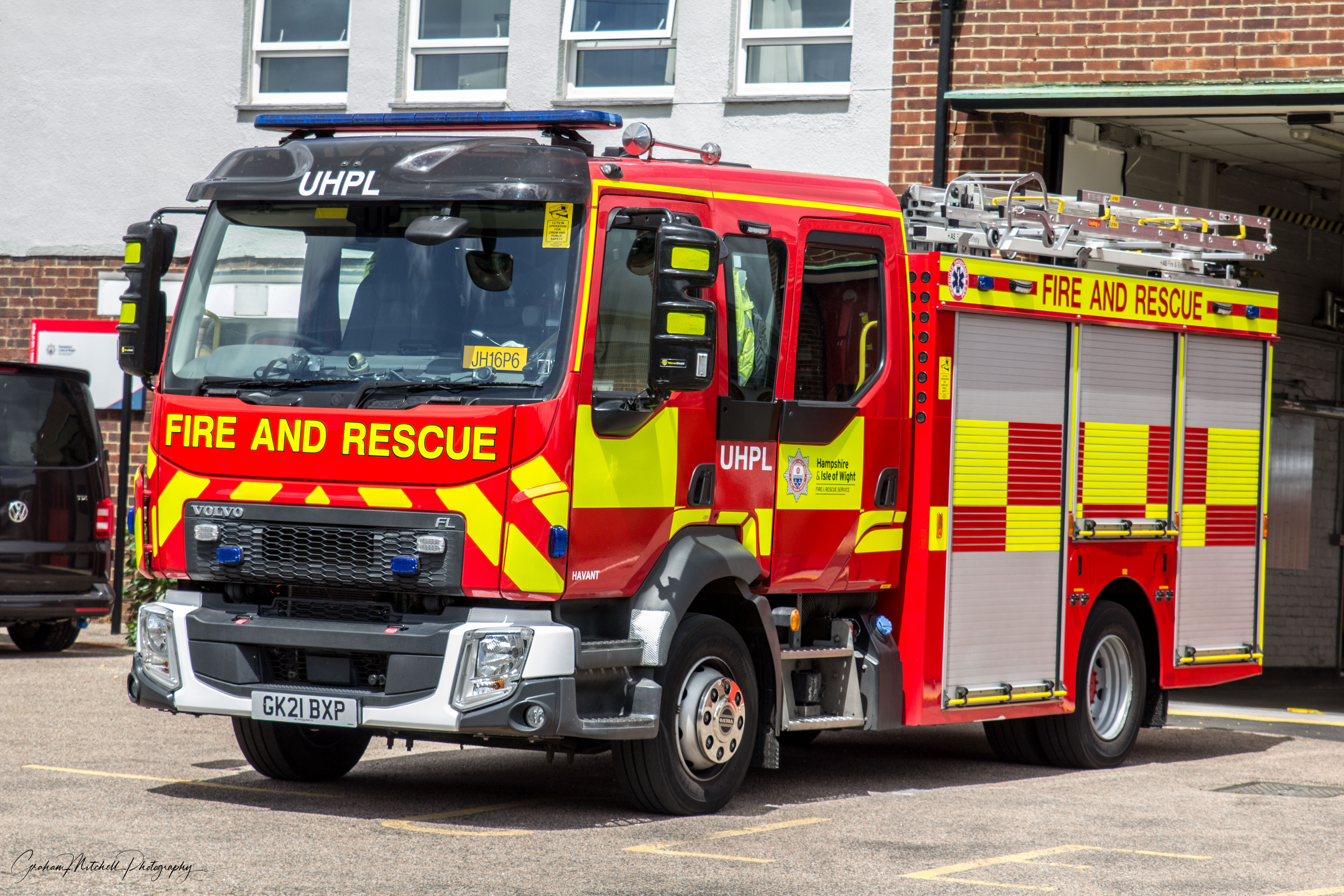
Volvo fire appliance at Havant fire station

Following operational changes approved by the Hampshire and Isle of Wight Fire and Rescue Authority in 2025, Bembridge Fire Station closed and Yarmouth Fire Station merged with Freshwater Fire Station.

HIWFRS fire stations operate on one of three duty systems.

- Wholetime – 5 fire stations are crewed 24 hours a day, seven days a week by full-time firefighters
- Retained – 44 fire stations use retained firefighters, who are on call and live or work within easy reach of the fire station
- Wholetime / Retained – 10 fire stations use a combination of wholetime and retained firefighters.

The fire stations are divided into four geographical groups.

- North
- East
- West
- Isle of Wight

=== Co-responding ===
HIWFRS works in partnership with the South Central Ambulance Service and Isle of Wight Ambulance Service to provide emergency medical cover to select areas. The aim of a fire service co-responder is to preserve life until the arrival of an ambulance service paramedic. Co-responder units (CRU) consist of a single specially trained firefighter, who, where fire service operational cover is available, will take the CRU and attend a medical emergency at the request of the ambulance service.

== Operations ==
=== Control ===
HIWFRS have their own control room that is responsible for receiving 999 calls and mobilising appliances.

The service is a member of the Networked Fire Services Partnership, alongside Devon and Somerset Fire and Rescue Service and Dorset & Wiltshire Fire and Rescue Service. Each service uses the same command and control system, allowing interoperability and resilience if one service is under pressure.

=== UK-ISAR ===
The service's search and rescue team also partner with the United Kingdom International Search and Rescue Team (UK-ISAR). The provide search teams and welfare equipment such as toilets, shelter, food water to deployed teams.

== 3SFire ==
Wholly owned by the Hampshire and Isle of Wight Fire and Rescue Authority, 3SFire is a consultancy and training business based around offering specialist health and safety and fire training and fire safety consultancy. All profits from the business are returned to the Authority to assist with running the Fire and Rescue Service.

== See also ==
- Fire services in the United Kingdom
