= Scottish Fire and Rescue Service =

National fire and rescue service of Scotland

Operational area
- Country: Scotland

Agency overview
- Established: 1 April 2013
- Employees: 7,556 (2025)
- Annual budget: £314.59 million (operational); £43.05 million (capital)
- Fire chief: Stuart Stevens
- Motto: Working together for a safer Scotland

Facilities and equipment
- Stations: 356 (2025)
- Engines: 424 (2025)
- Ladders: 16 (2025)
- Fireboats: 20–35
- Rescue boats: 20

Website
- www.firescotland.gov.uk

The Scottish Fire and Rescue Service (SFRS; Scottish Gaelic: Seirbheis Smàlaidh agus Teasairginn na h-Alba) is the national fire and rescue service of Scotland, with its operational headquarters located in Cambuslang. It was formed by the merger of eight regional fire services in the country on 1 April 2013, thus becoming the largest fire brigade in the United Kingdom, surpassing the London Fire Brigade. The force was established as a result of the passing of Scottish Government legislation. The Police and Fire Reform (Scotland) Act 2012 was passed by the Scottish Parliament, and, in 2013, the new Scottish Fire and Rescue Service replaced Scotland's eight regional fire and rescue services.

The current chief officer of the Scottish Fire and Rescue Service is Stuart Stevens who has overall responsibility for the day-to-day running of the fire and rescue service and all its associated operations.

== Consolidation and structure ==
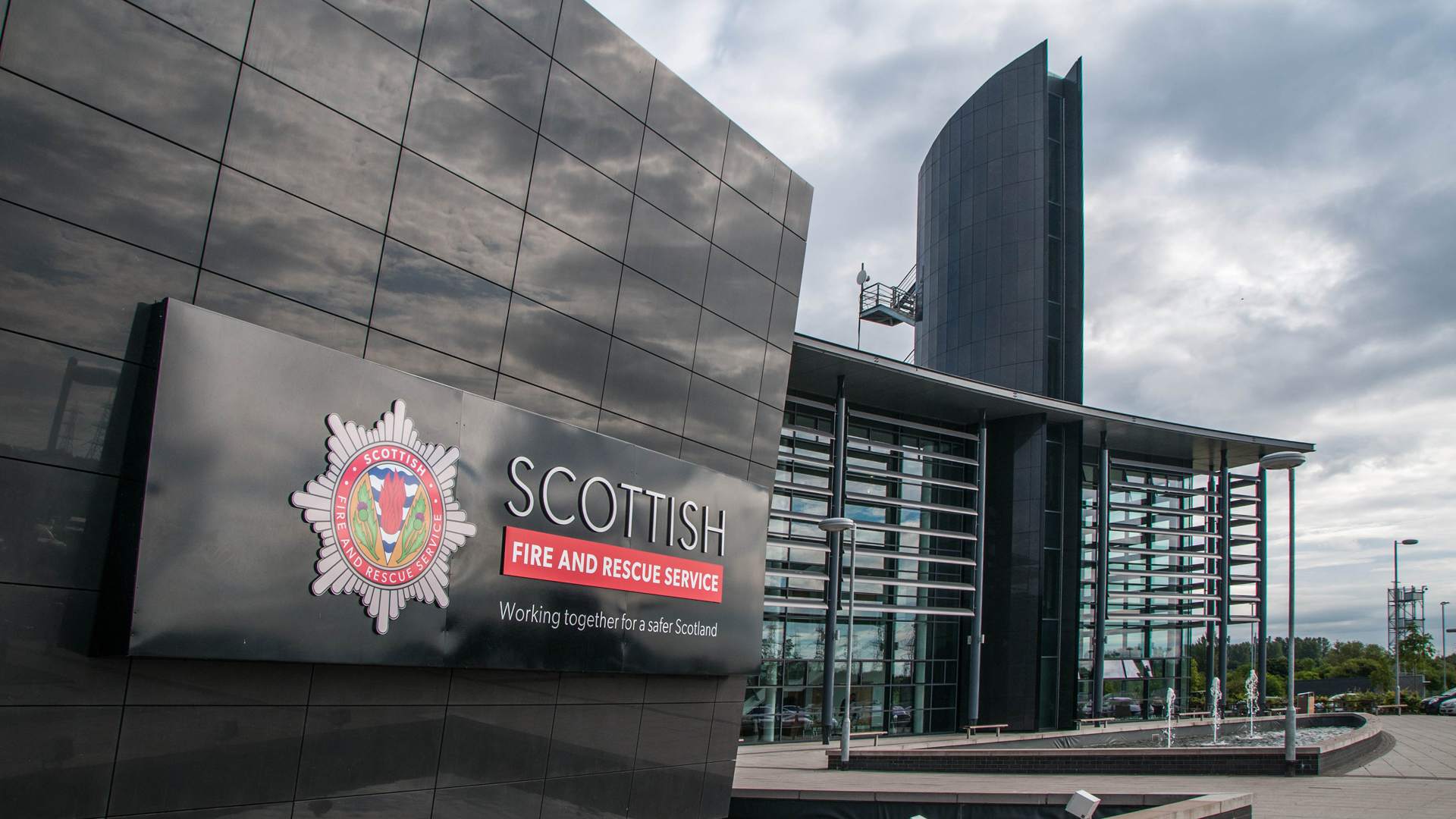
Scottish Fire and Rescue Service Headquarters, Cambuslang

After a consultation, the Scottish Government confirmed on 8 September 2011 that a single fire and rescue service would be created in Scotland to replace the eight existing local authority fire and rescue services.

Following further consultation on the detailed operation of the service, the Police and Fire Reform (Scotland) Bill was published on 17 January 2012. After scrutiny and debate by the Scottish Parliament, the legislation was approved on 27 June 2012. The Bill duly received royal assent as the Police and Fire Reform (Scotland) Act 2012. This Act also created Police Scotland in place of the previous eight regional police forces. The mergers were effective from 1 April 2013. Eight months after the consolidation, an internal report said the reorganisation had not negatively affected operational response.

The eight services that were merged are:

- Central Scotland Fire and Rescue Service
- Dumfries and Galloway Fire and Rescue Service
- Fife Fire and Rescue Service
- Grampian Fire and Rescue Service
- Highlands and Islands Fire and Rescue Service
- Lothian and Borders Fire and Rescue Service
- Strathclyde Fire and Rescue
- Tayside Fire and Rescue Service

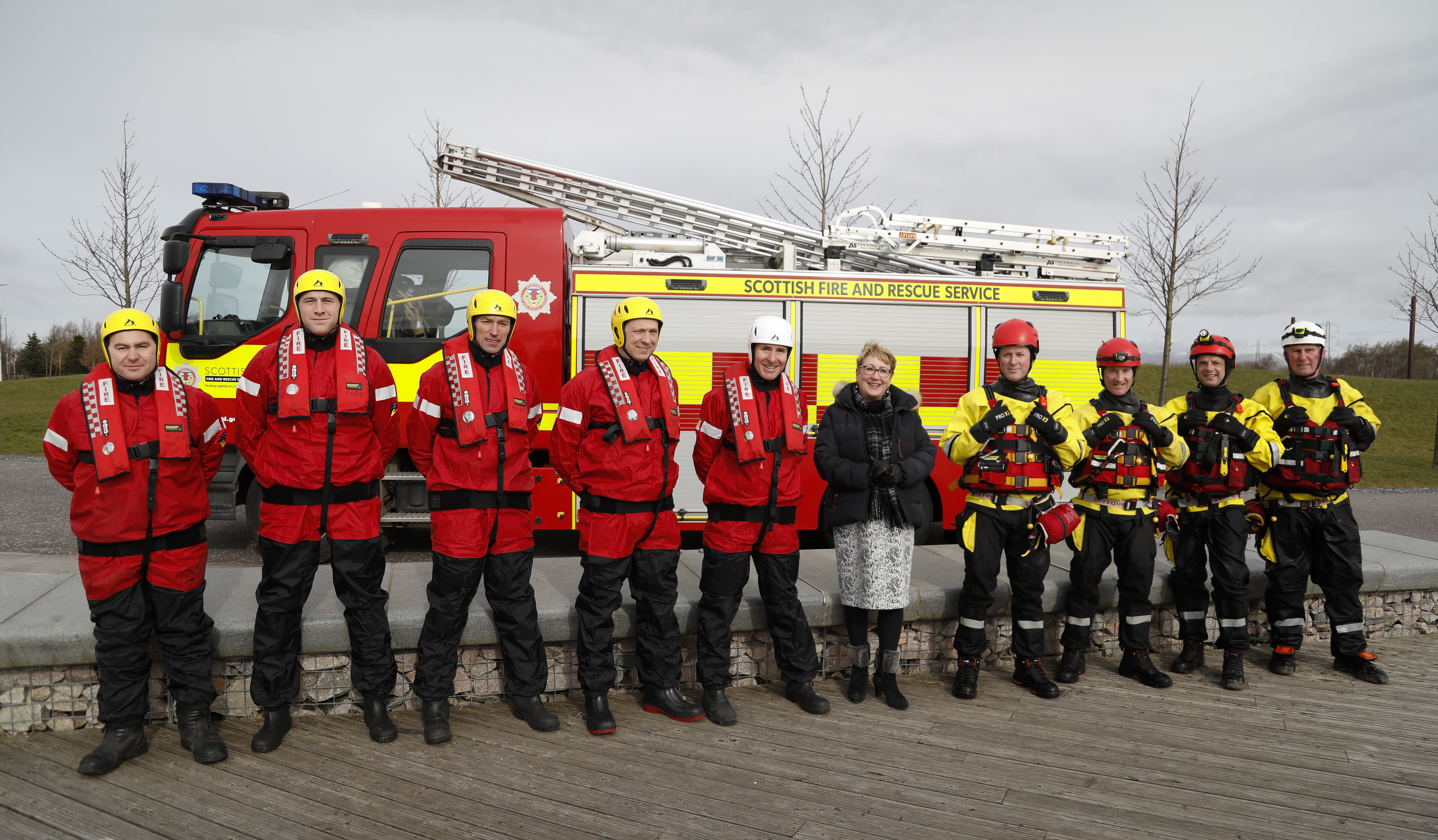
Firefighters of the Scottish Fire and Rescue Service with Minister for Community Safety and Legal Affairs, Annabelle Ewing, on its fifth anniversary in operation, 2018

The number of control rooms handling 999 calls was also reduced from eight to three. The consolidation of regional call centres has reportedly resulted in a number of dispatching errors. For example, a crew from Beauly was sent to a blaze 10 miles away in Dingwall as the dispatcher was allegedly unaware Dingwall had its own fire station. The service is headquartered in Cambuslang, South Lanarkshire, on the south-eastern outskirts of Glasgow, incorporating a national training centre, opened in January 2013. There are a further three service delivery centres in the east, west and north of the country.

On 16 August 2012, the Scottish Government confirmed the first chief fire officer of the new service would be Alasdair Hay, then acting chief fire officer of Tayside Fire and Rescue Service, following an open recruitment exercise. Pat Watters, former president of the Convention of Scottish Local Authorities, was also announced as chair of the service, an appointment to run for three years from September 2012. Members of the SFRS Board appointed in October 2012 were Watters, Bob Benson, James Campbell, Kirsty Darwent, Marieke Dwarshuis, Michael Foxley, Robin Iffla, Bill McQueen, Sid Patten, Neil Pirie, Martin Togneri and Grant Thoms.

== Chief officers ==
- 2013–2019: Alasdair Hay
- 2019–2022: Martin Blunden
- 2022–2024: Ross Haggart
- 2024–present: Stuart Stevens

== Operations ==
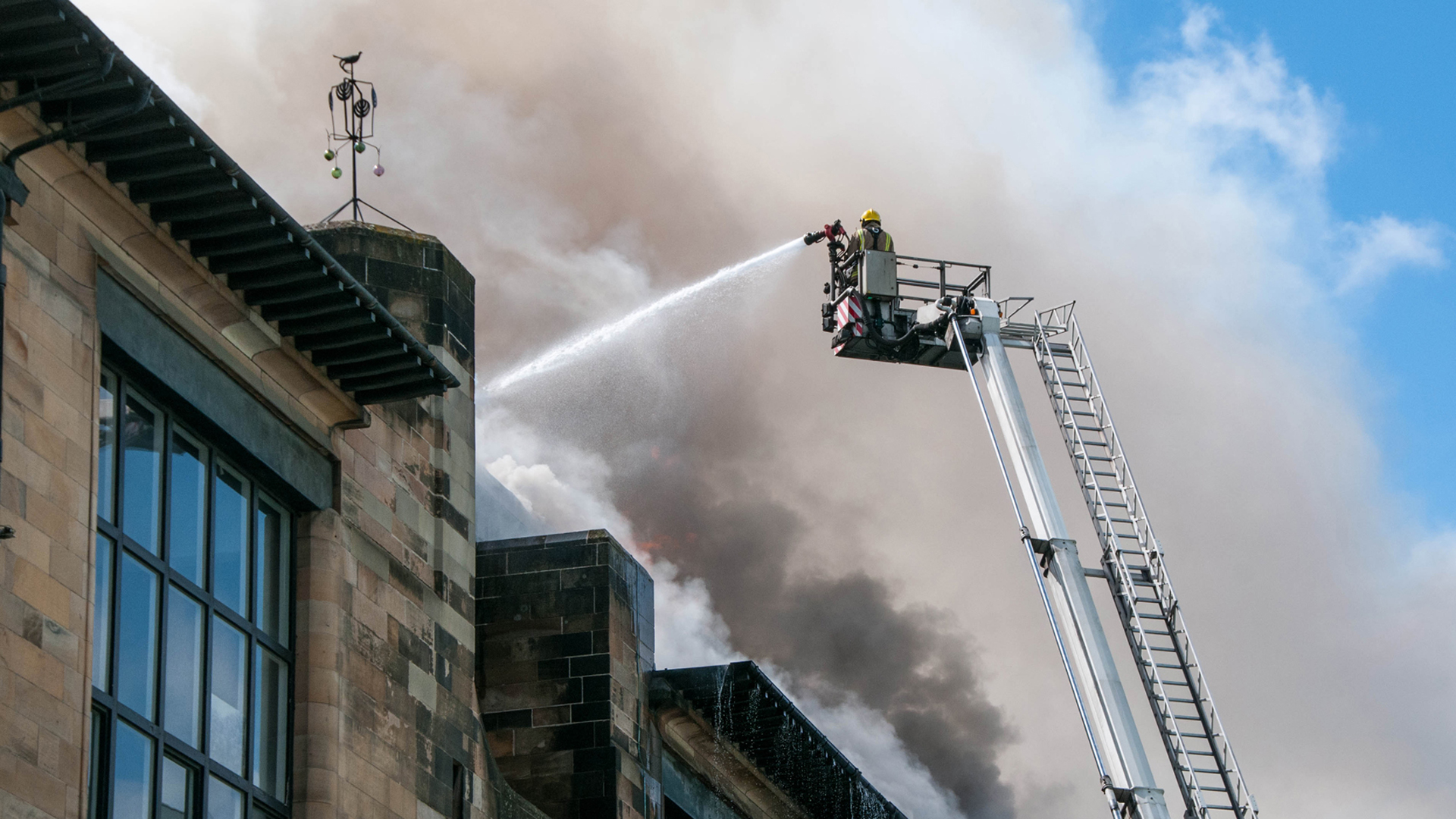
SFRS firefighter douses flames at the Glasgow School of Art fire in May 2014

The Scottish Fire and Rescue Service attended 25,002 fires in 2014/15. The service also delivers a preventative programme, with 65,343 free home fire safety visits conducted in 2015/16.

As well as fighting fires, the service attends a wide range of specialist incidents, such as road traffic collisions (RTC), water rescue, rope (line) rescue, urban search and rescue (USAR), chemical biological radiological and nuclear (CBRN) and terrorist attacks. In 2014/15, the service attended 10,740 non-fire incidents, 102 of the fire stations in the Scottish Fire & Rescue Service have specialist capabilities for non-fire/major incidents.

In 2024/2025, SFRS had a £314.59 million operational budget and £43.05 million capital budget.

=== New Dimensions Programme ===
In partnership with the Scottish Executive (now the Scottish Government) and the Scottish Fire Services Inspectorate and in response to the September 11 attacks, the development of the New Dimensions (ND) programme began in 2001. Similar to that of the English and Welsh New Dimensions programme, the overall aim of the project was to prepare sufficient responses to protect the public and respond to potential terrorist incidents as well as the likes of Urban Search and Rescue (USAR) and Mass Decontamination (MD) incidents in Scotland. The programme also focused on other aspects of fire and rescue that have not yet been fully fleshed out to the extent they could be (e.g., wildfires, water rescue) to enhance the capability of Scotland's fire services. Prior to the 2013 merger, this set out a model response across all services when dealing with major disruptive incidents where mutual assistance would be needed. To support this, the Scottish Government funded a range of specialist vehicles and equipment to deal with these new hazards, and as of 2020 there were 39 resilience appliances in SFRS' fleet.

=== Hazardous Materials ===
The Scottish Fire and Rescue Service and its antecedents all had and continue to follow the requirement to respond to hazardous materials (HAZMAT) incidents, referring to incidents involving biological and chemical agents which has the capacity to cause harm to people, animals and the environment, providing scientific advisory, environmental protection, mass decontamination and detection, identification and monitoring (DIM) services in co-operation with partner agencies with the aim of neutralising and managing HAZMAT incidents.

==== Detection, Identification, Monitoring (DIM) ====
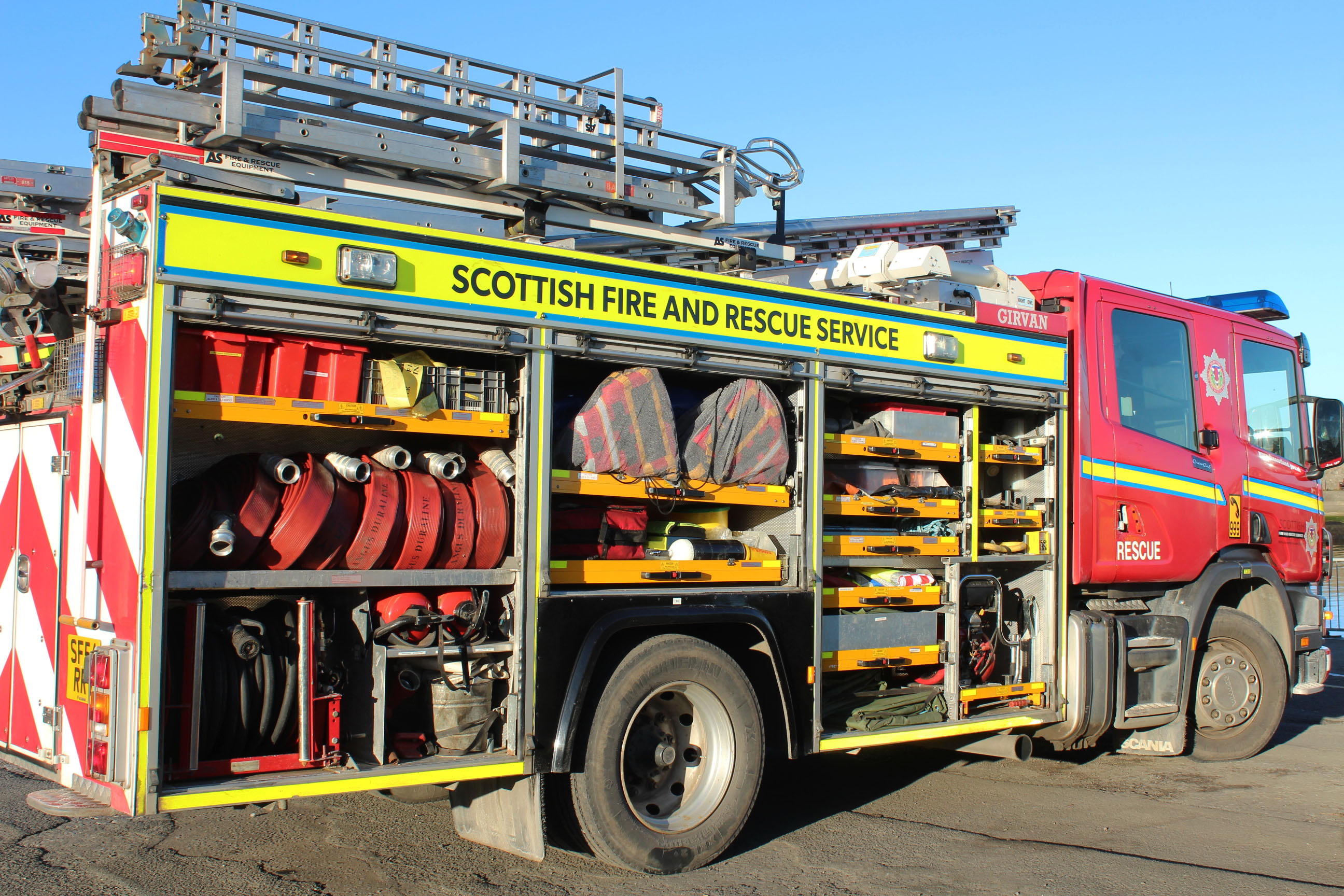
A Scottish Fire and Rescue Service engine from the Girvan fire station in 2017

The Scottish Fire and Rescue Service has a fleet of 4 Detection, Identification, Monitoring (DIM) vehicles strategically provided by the Scottish Government to four out of the eight legacy fire services under Scottish Resilience stationed at Aberdeen, Dundee, Glasgow and Edinburgh. These vehicles are generally crewed by flexi-duty officers to support its operations at incidents. The DIM vehicles are used as a form of mobile laboratory at serious chemical, biological radiological and nuclear (CBRN) instances, supporting a wide range of incidents including flooding, HAZMAT, Urban Search And Rescue (USAR) and Mass Decontamination. The vehicles are capable of identifying substances at incidents where the material of concern has not yet been identified.

==== Environmental Protection ====
The Scottish Fire and Rescue Service has numerous equipment and vehicles used to protect the environment and animals from potentially harmful incidents across Scotland. There are 11 HAZMAT/Environmental Protection vehicles in SFRS' fleet, eight of which are deployed via a demountable pod system.

==== Mass Decontamination (MD) ====
Mass Decontamination (MD) is the removal of harmful contaminants from large amounts of people in the case of chemical, biological, radiological, nuclear (CBRN) incidents and industrial accidents. There are multiple specialist resources strategically placed across Scotland, all funded by the Scottish Government in order to sufficiently respond to such incidents. Every fire appliance and crew in Scotland has the capabilities to provide simple decontamination procedures for incidents in which there is a small number of people affected or in the early stages of a mass decontamination incidents, utilising basic firefighting equipment such as hosereels and ladders.

=== Urban Search and Rescue (USAR) ===
Urban Search and Rescue (USAR) operations aim to respond to the likes of major transportation incidents and collapsed buildings. There are several strategically placed USAR assets across Scotland with most of which being based on demountable pod systems, these assets are interchangeable with heavy rescue resources, there is also a USAR dog based at Portlethen, Aberdeenshire used to track the scents of survivors at the scene of building collapses or other similar incidents. From 2010 to 2013 there were 15 partial building collapses across Scotland.

=== High Volume Pumps (HVP) ===
Under the New Dimensions programme 4 high-volume pumping units (HVPU) were provided by the Scottish government and strategically placed across Scotland at Elgin, Dundee, Falkirk and Clydesmill (Glasgow). HVPs are demountable modules transported by prime mover, carrying a kilometre of hose and a submersible pump used to pump water from lakes and rivers. The primary use of HVPs is to support flooding incidents but can be used in firefighting instances such as the 2018 Glasgow School of Art fire because of their capabilities to transport large quantities of water.

=== Water rescue ===
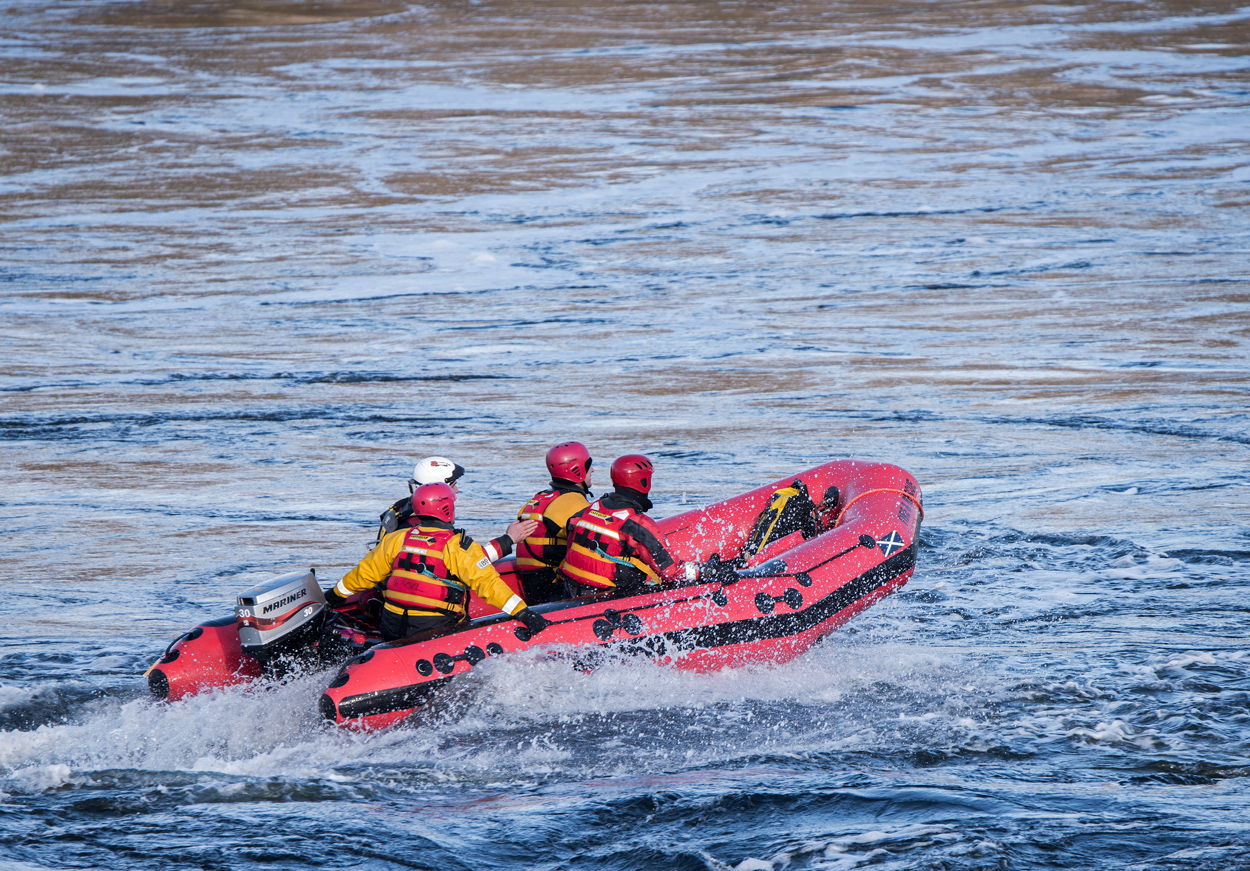
Scottish Fire & Rescue Service RIB

In 2005 under government legislation it became the eight antecedent fire and rescue service's of Scotland's responsibility to prepare and respond to flooding and other water related incidents in which there is a risk of a person to die, become seriously ill or injured and protect them from harm. After the 2013 merger of SFRS and the abundance of rivers and lochs, it was decided a generalised and revised water rescue capability should be established. The result of this is a Mercedes Sprinter van containing water rescue equipment, welfare facilities, and trailering a rigid permanently inflated boat for immediate deployment. Twenty of SFRS' stations have one of these dedicated water rescue units. The Water Rescue Units regularly respond to flooding, difficulty in water, and water-related rescue incidents. Additionally 78 stations have specialist flood response capabilities .

The service is the primary emergency service for the rescue of persons from the River Clyde in Glasgow and works alongside other emergency services during flooding events to ensure the safety of communities and rescue people in difficulty, with specialist swift water rescue teams positioned on major waterways and areas of activity. Firefighters are routinely called out to water, flood and boat rescues. For example, during Storm Frank in December 2015, SFRS received 350 flood-related calls in the space of six days.

=== Wildfires ===
The frequency and scale of wildfire incidents in Scotland have increased in recent years. In 2015, SFRS were called out to 78 wildfire incidents in total, with over half of those taking place in the north of Scotland. In 2025, Scotland experienced its most severe wildfire season on record, with a total of 241 wildfire incidents throughout the year.

=== Medical emergencies ===
In 2015, a national trial was launched, in partnership with the Scottish Ambulance Service, which has seen firefighters at certain stations receive enhanced cardiopulmonary resuscitation (CPR) training aimed at increasing survival rates for people who suffer out-of-hospital cardiac arrests.

In 2007, Grampian Fire & Rescue Service in partnership with the Scottish Ambulance Service launched two Community first responder vehicles at Braemar and Maud fire stations, firefighters at these specific stations trained at First Responder levels can be pagered by the North SDA on request of the Scottish Ambulance Service.

=== Line rescue ===
Line or rope rescue is a type of technical rescue involving the use of ropes, harness, anchoring and hauling devices to assist rescues at height or below ground level at urban and structural locations. While many crews are trained to a safe working at height (SWAH) standard, line rescue crews are trained to a more advanced capacity to deal with more complex technical rescues at the likes of open structures, utilising horizontal and vertical stretcher lowering and raising.

Four stations contain these line rescue units (LRU), strategically placed across the country in Altens (Aberdeen), Lochgelly, Tollcross (Edinburgh), and East Kilbride.

== Fire stations ==
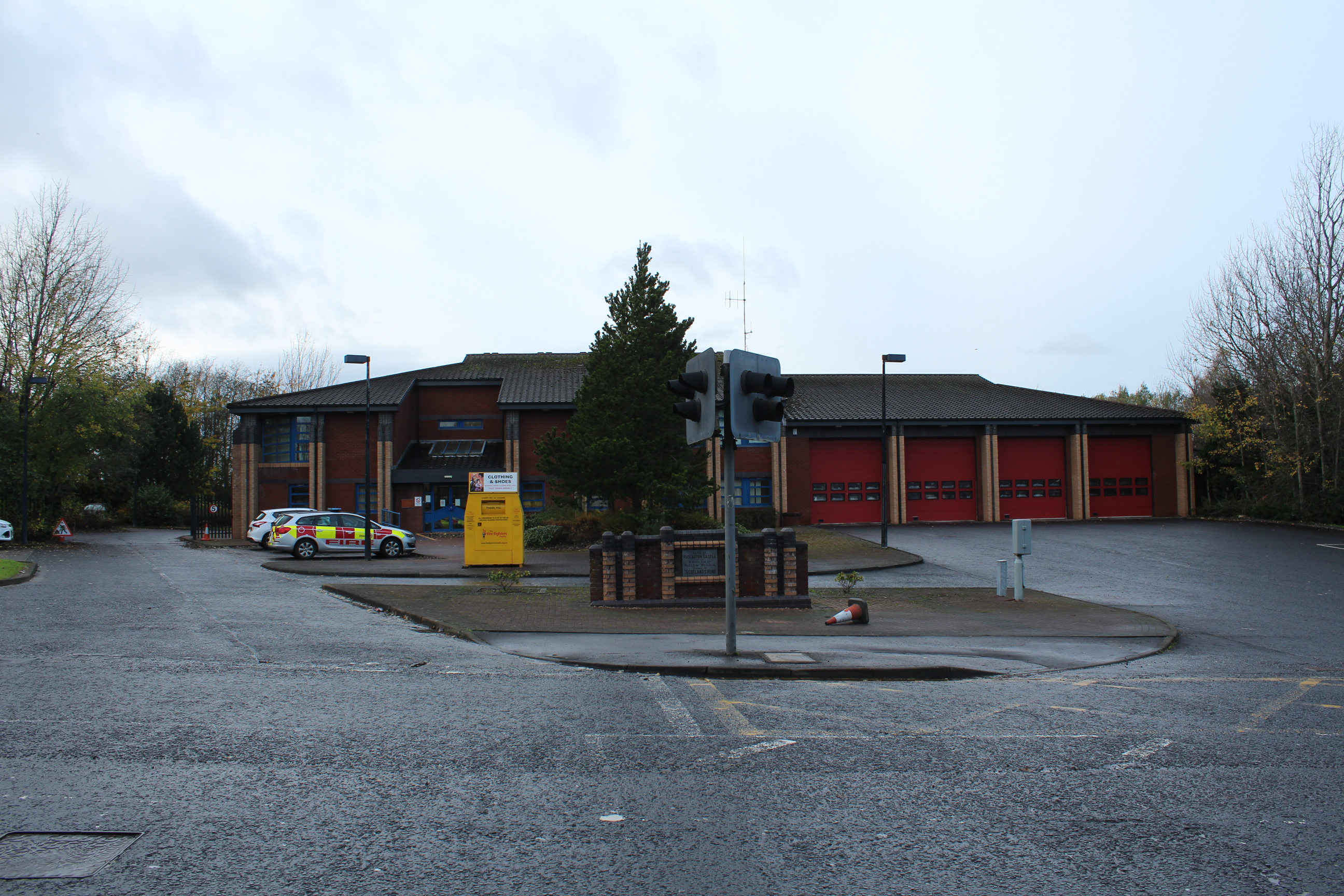
Scottish Fire and Rescue Service station located in Kilmarnock

Currently the Scottish Fire & Rescue Service operate 356 fire stations throughout Scotland.

These stations are as follows:

- 74 Wholetime fire stations
- 240 Retained Duty System fire stations
- 42 Volunteer fire stations

Scotland's fire stations are crewed in six different ways:

- Wholetime (WT): A station with full-time firefighters crewing twenty-four hours a day.
- Wholetime/Retained Duty System (WT/RDS): As above but with retained firefighters providing back-up when required.
- Wholetime/Day-Crewed (WT/DC): Livingston fire station operates with wholetime firefighters crewing the first appliance, and day-shift firefighters crewing the second appliance (0800-1800hrs Monday - Friday), and retained firefighters who will then respond via pager at night and weekends should the appliance receive a turnout. .
- Retained Duty System (RDS): Crewing on an 'on-call' basis. These are predominantly located in some of the more rural areas. These firefighters are alerted by a pager to an incident. They receive an annual retainer, which varies depending on a person's availability. Once a call is made, they receive a disturbance fee, an attendance fee and then the same hourly rate as WT firefighters.
- Volunteer (VOL): Volunteers receive no retaining fee like the RDS crews, however receive the same hourly rate of pay as their RDS counterparts if they get mobilised.
- Community Response Unit (CRU): a volunteer unit with a small appliance in more rural areas, where full fire cover is provided by neighbouring stations. These stations are only alerted to deal with RTC and wildfire incidents

=== Northern Service Delivery Area ===
The Northern Service Delivery Area incorporates all of the fire stations of the former fire & rescue services of Grampian (GFRS), Highlands & Islands (H&IFRS) and Tayside (TFRS). It has 1.2 million residents and operates 164 fire stations. The Northern Service Delivery Area headquarters is located at Dyce fire station on the outskirts of the city of Aberdeen. For ease of operations and multi-agency interaction, the Service Delivery Area is further sub-divided into smaller Local Service Areas structured in line with local councils; they are:

- Perth & Kinross, Angus and Dundee
- Aberdeen City, Aberdeenshire and Moray
- Highland (East)
- Highland (West)
- Western Isles, Orkney Isles and Shetland Isles

=== East Service Delivery Area ===
The East Service Delivery Area incorporates fire stations of the former Central Scotland Fire & Rescue Service (CSFRS), Fife Fire & Rescue Service (FFRS) and Lothian & Borders Fire & Rescue Service (L&BFRS). It has 1.6 million residents and operates 65 fire stations. The East Delivery Service Area Headquarters are located at Newbridge, to the west of Edinburgh. The facilities at Newbridge also house the workshops and Asset Resource Centre. In 2020, a new state of the art training facility was opened at Newbridge, which replaced the former one at Thornton, in Fife. For ease of operations and multi-agency interaction, the Service Delivery Area is further sub-divided into smaller Local Service Areas structured in line with local councils; they are:

- Midlothian, East Lothian and Scottish Borders
- Edinburgh City
- Falkirk and West Lothian
- Stirling & Clackmannanshire
- Fife

=== Western Service Delivery Area ===
The Western Service Delivery Area incorporates all the fire stations of both the former Dumfries & Galloway Fire and Rescue Service (D&GFRS) and Strathclyde Fire & Rescue (SFR). It has 2.4 million residents and operates 127 fire stations. The Western Service Delivery Area headquarters is located at Hamilton Fire Station to the east of Glasgow. For ease of operations and multi-agency interaction, the Service Delivery Area is further sub-divided into smaller Local Service Areas structured in line with local councils; they are:

- City of Glasgow
- South Lanarkshire
- North Lanarkshire
- East Dumbartonshire, West Dumbartonshire and Argyll & Bute
- East Renfrewshire, Renfrewshire and Inverclyde
- East Ayrshire, North Ayrshire and South Ayrshire
- Dumfries & Galloway

== National Training Centre ==
The Scottish Fire and Rescue Service National Training Centre opened in January 2013. The facility in Cambuslang features a mock town with realistic motorways, railway tracks and buildings, including a multi-storey tenement structure.

== See also ==
- His Majesty's Fire Service Inspectorate for Scotland
- Mountain Rescue Committee of Scotland
- List of British firefighters killed in the line of duty
