= Fire and rescue authority (Scotland) =

A fire and rescue authority (FRA) was a type of body constituted under the Fire (Scotland) Act 2005 (FSA 2005) for the purposes of providing and managing fire-fighting and rescue services within a council area or group of such areas in Scotland.

== Constitution ==
A fire and rescue authority was by default the council of a council area as defined in s.2 Local Government (Scotland) Act 1994. With the exception of Fife and of Dumfries and Galloway, the powers and functions were all exercised by joint fire and rescue boards, which combined the responsibilities of two or more councils; these boards mostly covered the land areas of the local authorities which existed in Scotland from 1975 to 1996.

== Funding ==
Provision of "equipment, etc." could be made by the Scottish Ministers as they saw fit from time to time. In 2002 80% of FRA funding was from aggregate external finance (the total of government grants, non-domestic rates and specific grants distributed by the Scottish Government among local authorities as revenue support grant) and 20% from Council Tax.

== Functions ==
An authority's principal functions were defined in Chapter 2 of the FSA 2005 and include promotion of fire safety, provision of fire-fighting services, rescue and protection at road traffic accidents and dealing with such other emergencies and matters as they are directed by the Scottish Ministers.

As ancillary functions an authority could also take any other action which it deemed necessary to save human life, prevent illness or injury to humans or to protect the environment (including any animals, plants and buildings).

== Powers and duties of an authority ==
An authority was permitted to provide education and training centres in relation to its functions.

An authority could impose a non-profit charge for any service for which the Scottish Ministers imposed a charging order.

An authority had a duty to take "reasonable measures" to ensure an adequate water supply for most of its own purposes.

An authority had a duty to co-operate (voluntarily or as directed by the Scottish Ministers) by way of a 'reinforcement scheme' with other authorities for purposes of mutual assistance. An authority could also arrange for persons other than a fire and rescue service to perform some functions subject to the over-riding authority of the Scottish Ministers.

=== Powers and duties of an "authorised employee" of an authority ===
An "authorised employee" was an employee of a relevant authority who was authorised in writing to perform the following functions and actions as specified in various sections of FSA 2005.

An authorised employee of an authority who was on duty was permitted to do anything which he "reasonably believes" to protect life and/or property. This includes the power to break into premises or vehicles, move vehicles without the owner's consent, interfere with the free movement of traffic and to prevent people entering any premises or place.

An authorised employee could enter premises and seek information relevant to the authority's functions. A sheriff's warrant could be obtained to allow such entry and any associated force if reasonable access was not given.

An authorised employee who had entered premises has a duty to leave them no less secure than they were found.

== Government supervision ==
The Scottish Ministers were responsible for providing guidance to FRAs regarding their priorities and objectives in carrying out their functions. Inspection of FRAs was carried out by a Chief Inspector of Fire and Rescue Authorities (appointed by an Order in Council), inspectors and assistant inspectors (both the latter appointed by the Scottish Ministers).

== Abolition ==
With the formation of the single Scottish Fire and Rescue Service the fire and rescue authorities ceased to exist.
