= Strathclyde Fire and Rescue Service =

Fire and rescue service

Strathclyde Fire and Rescue

Operational area
- Country: Scotland
- Region: Strathclyde

Agency overview
- Established: 1975 (merger)
- Dissolved: 1 April 2013
- Employees: 3,683
- Chief Fire Officer: Brian P. Sweeney

Facilities and equipment
- Stations: 111

Website
- Official website

Strathclyde Fire & Rescue was the statutory fire and rescue service for the area of Strathclyde, Scotland between 1975 and 2013. It was the largest fire and rescue service in Scotland, and one of the largest in Europe. Its territory ranged from the densely populated Glasgow to remote rural and island communities. It was amalgamated into the single Scottish Fire and Rescue Service in April 2013.

== History ==
Strathclyde Fire Brigade was formed in 1975 when control of fire services was passed from local authorities to the new Strathclyde Regional Council. When Strathclyde Regional Council was abolished in 1996 the twelve new unitary authorities that replaced it agreed to keep the fire service as it was, under the supervision of the Strathclyde Fire Board.

A tender seeking bids to provide maintenance and repair services for the brigade's breathing apparatus, issued in 2004, led to a Scottish Court of Session case resolved in 2007 in favour of an unsuccessful bidder. The Board's evaluation team had made several mistakes through which they did not comply with the relevant public procurement legislation.

In 2005, the name was changed to Strathclyde Fire & Rescue to reflect the change in the operations that the modern fire and rescue service undertook. That year a book called Everyday Heroes was launched detailing the work of Strathclyde Fire & Rescue over the past 30 years.

=== Amalgamation in 2013 ===
Strathclyde Fire & Rescue, along with the other seven fire and rescue services across Scotland, was amalgamated into a single, new Scottish Fire and Rescue Service on 1 April 2013. This replaced the previous system of eight regional fire and rescue services across Scotland which had existed since 1975. The Scottish Fire and Rescue Service has its headquarters in Perth.

== Appliances ==
Strathclyde Fire & Rescue had over 200 appliances, which included Scania-made rescue pumps and aerial rescue pumps (ARP), heavy rescue vehicles, technical support units, major incident units and water rescue units. Also the Volunteer Stations had Volunteer Support Units.

== Stations ==
The service operated 111 fire stations.

Area	Population	Full-time station	Retained station	Volunteer Stations
Argyll & Bute	92,000	2	13	27
East & West Dunbartonshire	209,000	5	1	0
Renfrewshire & Inverclyde	258,000	5	1	0
North East Glasgow	203,000	4	0	0
North West Glasgow	200,000	4	0	0
South Glasgow	217,000	4	0	0
North Lanarkshire	324,000	4	3	0
North & South Ayrshire	254,000	4	12	3
East Ayrshire & East Renfrewshire	351,000	3	7	0
South Lanarkshire	301,000	4	7	1

== Gallery ==
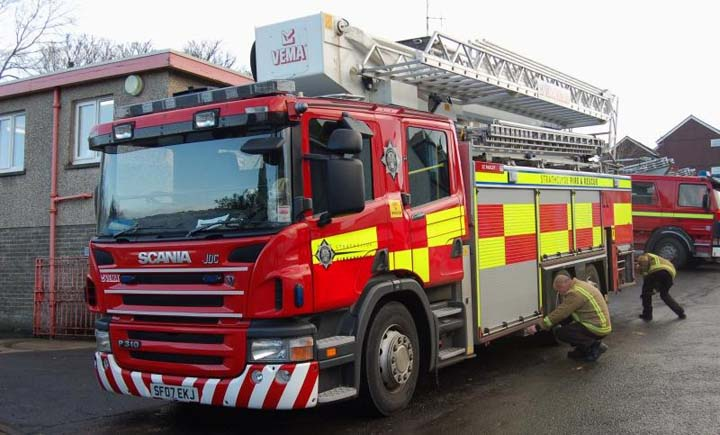
Scania Aerial Rescue Pump

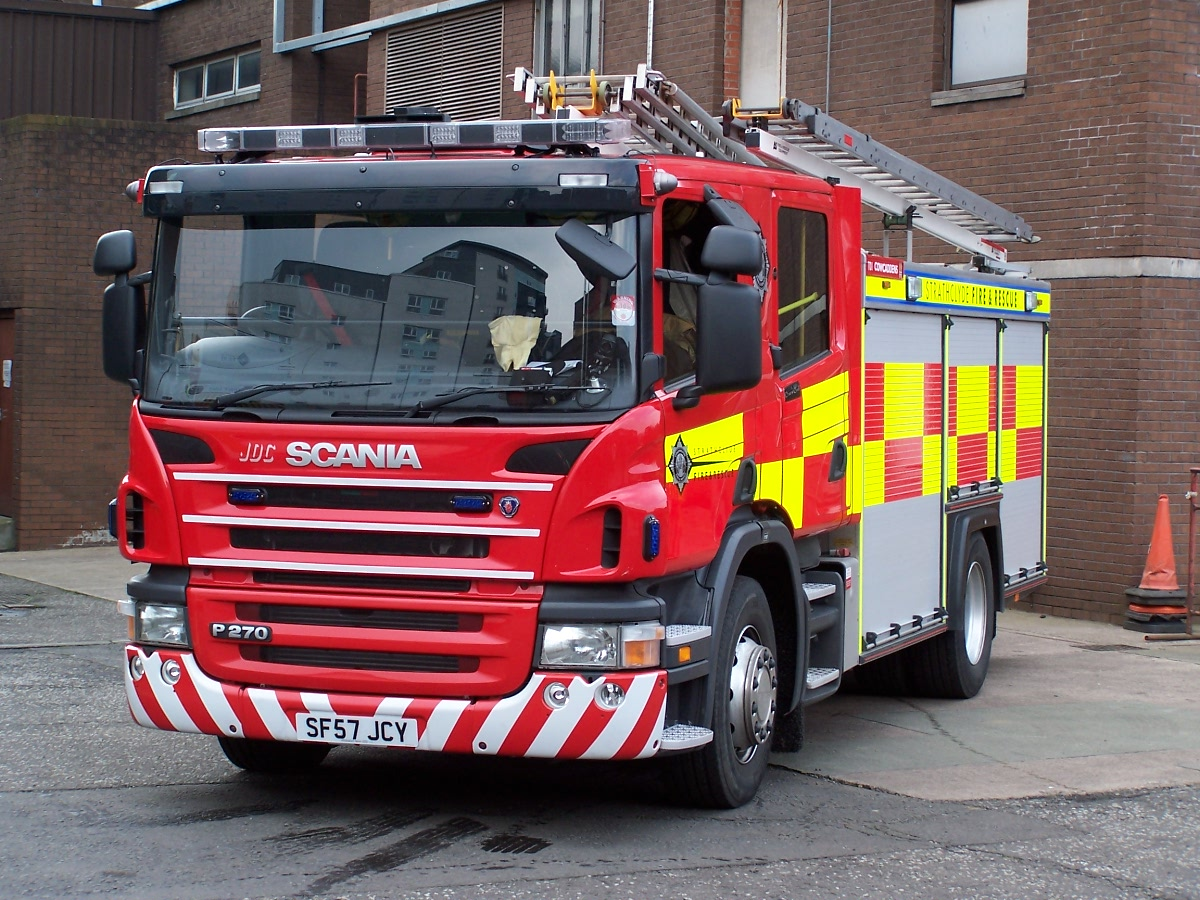
Scania Rescue Pump

== See also ==
- Blues and twos
- Fire Services in Scotland
- FiReControl
- Fire apparatus
- Fire engine
- Fire
- Fire Museum
- Fire and Rescue Authority (Scotland)
