= List of firefighters killed in the line of duty =

These lists cover firefighters killed in the line of duty, by country:

- List of New Zealand firefighters killed in the line of duty
- List of British firefighters killed in the line of duty
- List of firefighters killed in the line of duty in the United States

== See also ==
- List of the deadliest firefighter disasters in the United States
