= Volunteer fire department =

Fire department composed of volunteers

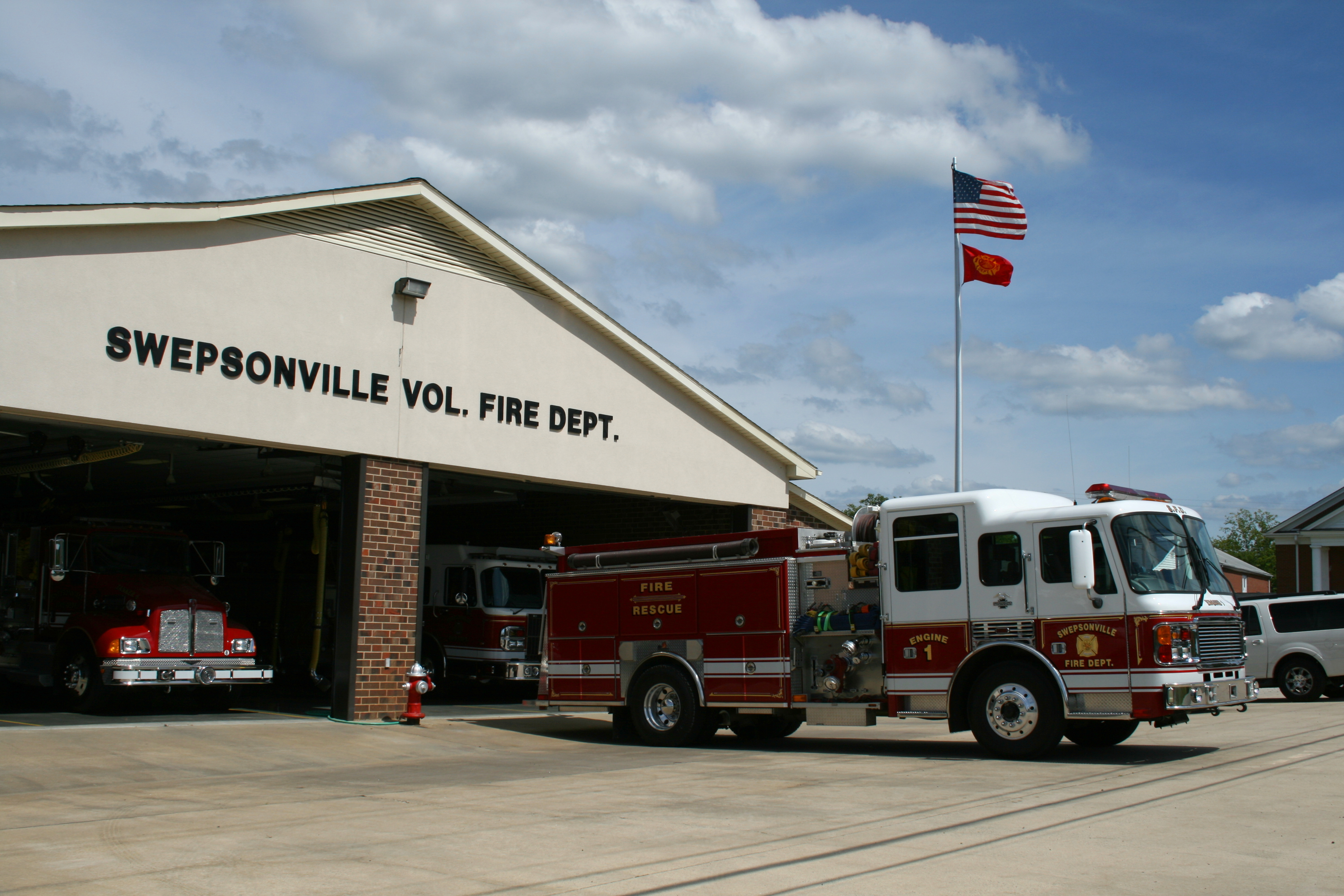
The Volunteer fire department of Swepsonville, North Carolina

A volunteer fire department (VFD) is a fire department of volunteers who perform fire suppression and other related emergency services for a local jurisdiction. Volunteer and retained (on-call) firefighters are expected to be available to respond to emergency calls for long periods of time, and are summoned to the fire station when their services are needed. They are also expected to attend other non-emergency duties as well, such as for training, fundraising, and equipment maintenance.

Volunteer firefighters contrast with paid firefighters who work full- or part-time and receive a salary. Some may be part of a combination fire department that utilizes both paid and volunteer firefighters. Firefighters who receive some pay for their work and responsiveness are known as call firefighters in the United States, and retained firefighters in the United Kingdom and Ireland.

== International ==
The earliest firefighting organizations were made up of volunteers. The first large organized force of firefighters was the Corps of Vigiles, established in ancient Rome in 6 AD.

=== Argentina ===
The first volunteer fire department in Argentina was Bomberos Voluntarios de La Boca (La Boca Volunteer Firemen) founded on June 2, 1884, by Italian immigrant Tomas Liberti in the neighborhood of La Boca, Buenos Aires. June 2 is the Day of Volunteer Firefighters. The Argentina Federation of Volunteer Firefighters was founded in 1954. In 2018, 80% of the country is covered by volunteers.

=== Australia ===
Throughout Australia, there are many volunteer firefighting agencies that are set up by individual states or territories. New South Wales is serviced by two statutory firefighting authorities. These are the New South Wales Rural Fire Service (NSWRFS) and Fire and Rescue NSW. Fire and Rescue NSW has firefighting and rescue responsibilities for the major cities, metropolitan areas, and several other towns in NSW. It also has the responsibility for all land-based HAZMAT incidents as well as inland waterway-based HAZMAT incidents. The NSWRFS is the volunteer firefighting service in NSW and consists of over 70,000 volunteers and has responsibility for over 90% of the land area in NSW. Although most of this is bush and grassland, the NSWRFS also serves smaller and regional communities that are not covered by Fire and Rescue NSW.

In Victoria, there are three main fire fighting organizations, Metropolitan Fire and Emergency Services Board (MFB), Country Fire Authority (CFA) and The Department of Environment, Water, Land, and Planning (DEWLP). The CFA is a volunteer and community-based fire and emergency services organization that is made up of around 61,000 members. Of these members, some 59,000 are volunteers. Their roles range from fire, rescue, HAZMAT, to non-operational support roles.

In Western Australia, fire fighting is organized by the Department of Fire and Emergency Services (DFES) together with Local Councils. DFES operates the Volunteer Fire and Rescue Service Brigades (VFRS) and some Bush Fire Service Brigades (BFS), while the remainder of the Bush Fire Service Brigades is trained by DFES, but operated and administered by the Council of the associated area. VFRS Brigades are generally more involved in Structural Fire fighting, Asset Protection, and Road Crash Rescue depending on their location, whereas the BFS Brigades are generally more involved in Wildfire Fighting. In Western Australia, there is an estimated 31,000 BFS Members among 585 Brigades, and 2,000 VFRS Members among 88 Brigades.

In South Australia, there are two legislated fire fighting organizations. The South Australian Metropolitan Fire Service (SAMFS) and the South Australian Country Fire Service (SACFS). The SACFS is staffed by approximately 13,500 volunteer firefighters and around 120 paid employees.

=== Austria and Germany ===
Volunteer fire department of Gristede (Lower Saxony)

Volunteer fire departments (Freiwillige Feuerwehr) provide the majority (97% of all German firefighters) of Austria's and Germany's civil protection services, alongside other volunteer organizations like the German Federal Agency for Technical Relief (THW), voluntary ambulance services and emergency medical or rescue services like German Red Cross or Johanniter-Unfall-Hilfe. In most rural fire departments, the staff consists only of volunteers. The members of these departments are usually on-call 24/7 and working in other professions.

The alarm can be performed by different alarm systems, such as by sirens or pager sometimes combined with an app on the mobile phone. In Germany, the alarm via radio pager is on the frequencies of the BOS radio. In Austria, the fire departments have their own frequencies.

In medium-sized cities and communities, fire departments will often be partially staffed by career firefighters. They ensure the rapid availability of some of the department's fire apparatus, with the remaining apparatus staffed and brought to the scene of the emergency by volunteers as soon as they arrive at the department.

Larger cities, typically those with 100,000 inhabitants or more, will operate fire departments staffed entirely by career firefighters. However, they also typically have several volunteer fire departments, who are called upon in case of larger emergencies.

Municipalities are the support of volunteer fire departments. Additional funding may include, for example, contributions from support organizations, donations made in fundraising, or income from various events.

=== Canada ===
While wholly volunteer fire departments are mostly found in rural and remote areas of Canada, "composite" departments composed of both career and volunteer or "call" firefighters can be found in more urbanized municipalities. For example, in the city of Kingston Ontario (population 130,000), of the ten stations operated by the Kingston Fire and Rescue Service, three are staffed with career firefighters, two are composite and five are wholly volunteer. There are an estimated 127,000 volunteer firefighters across the country. Most urban and larger fire services began as volunteer service and evolved into full-time members. Volunteer departments are necessary for areas that cannot afford to staff a full-time department. Unlike the United States where volunteer fire companies may operate independently of local government with limited tax base support, or as semi-private organizations, in Canada volunteer fire departments are normally operated by municipalities or by counties. Provinces establish standards of equipment and training that volunteer departments must meet.

The Upper Hammonds Plains Volunteer Fire Department was the first all-Black volunteer fire department in Canada, established in 1966 and officially incorporated in the 1970s, operating within Halifax County, Nova Scotia.

=== Chile ===
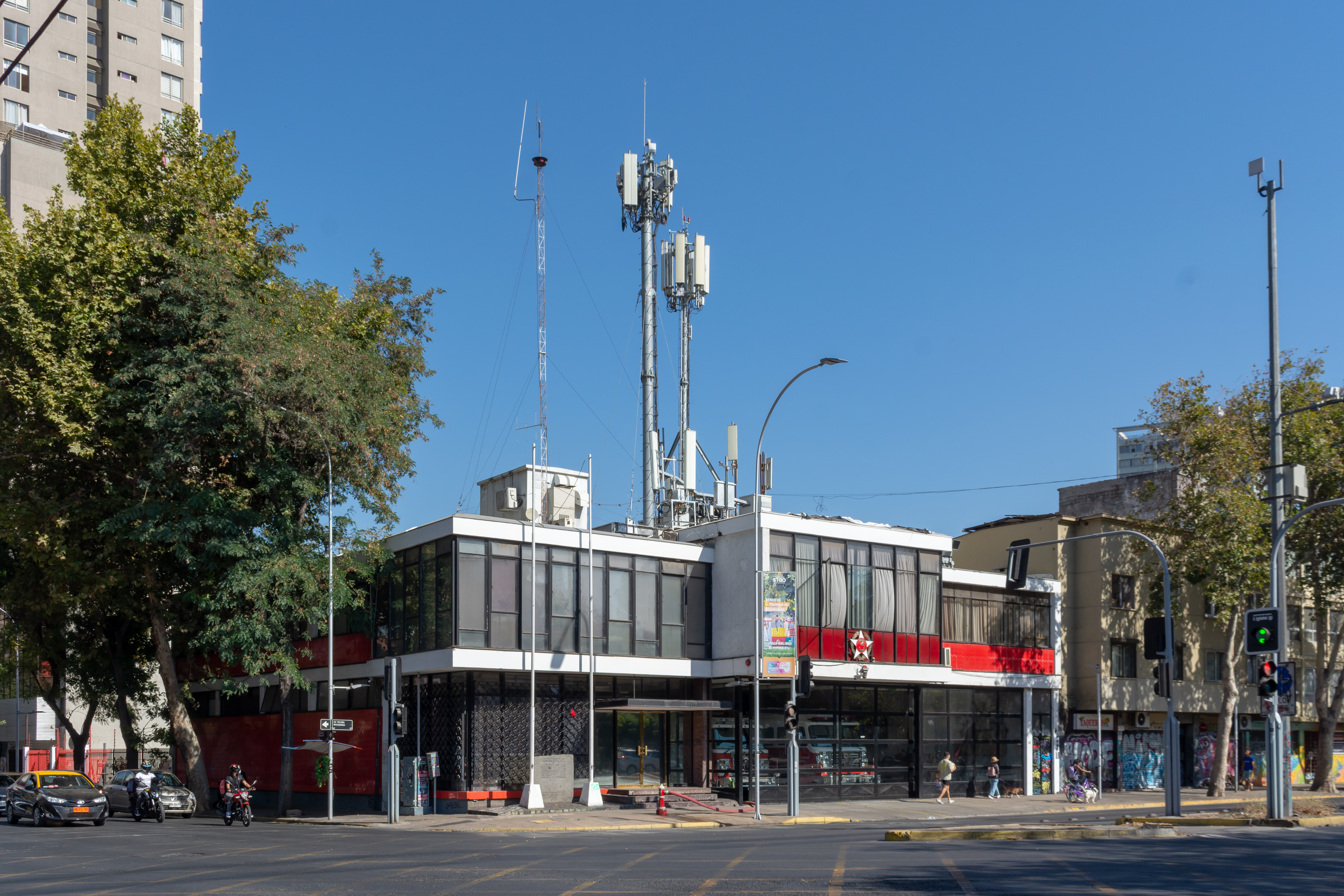
Firehouse belonging to the third company of the Santiago Fire Corps.

Chile is one of the few countries in the world in which all firefighters are unpaid. The country is subdivided into regions, provinces, and communes ("comunas"), local fire corps or departments ("Cuerpos de Bomberos") serve across single or multiple communes. As of today, 314 fire corps are currently operating. All fire corps are part of the Junta Nacional de Bomberos (National Board of Firefighters).

=== Croatia ===
There are 1,768 volunteer fire departments in Croatia, as well as 33 units of what is officially called "volunteer fire department in economy".

Some Croatian volunteer fire departments include:

- Zaprešić Volunteer Fire Department

=== Estonia ===
The first volunteer fire team in Estonia was created in 1788 by the Brotherhood of Blackheads, the first organization of volunteer firemen in 1862, also being the first such organization in Imperial Russia. Volunteer fire organizations existed throughout all political systems in Estonia since then, although the cause saw significant setbacks in the political purges following Soviet occupation. Volunteer fire brigades were the backbone of the rescue services before re-independence, owning around 3/4ths of rescue equipment, personnel, and also handling around 3/4ths of all fires, primarily in rural areas. In 2010, the nation's volunteer fire brigades were united under an umbrella organization, the Rescue Union (Estonian: Päästeliit), also including chimney sweeping, water rescue and similar organizations.

In 2021, there were 117 volunteer fire brigades (comprising 62% of all fire brigades) with a total of 2 319 volunteer firemen (comprising around half of Estonian rescue personnel). Volunteer fire brigades are placed in rural areas or the satellite areas of cities and towns. On smaller islands such as Naissaar or Abruka, the volunteer fire brigades are the only rescue brigades. In a few cases, volunteer brigades are attached to national ones. Due to being placed in primarily rural areas, they are often the first to arrive at the scene.

Volunteer organizations are funded through support via the national or local municipal budget, companies and donations.

=== Finland ===
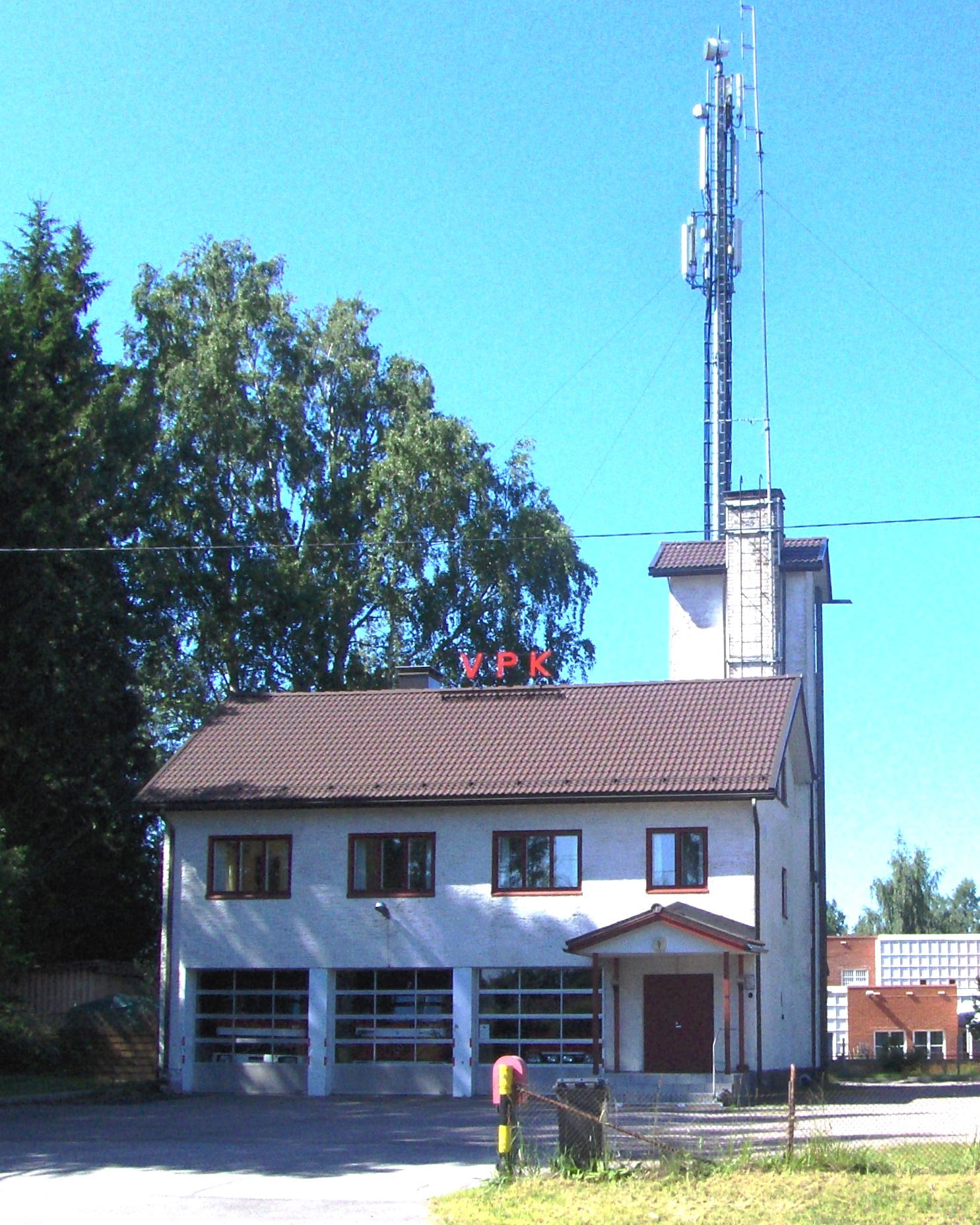
The volunteer fire department of Puistola, Helsinki

In Finland, the firefighting in the countryside mostly depends on volunteer fire departments, nearly always with a contract with the regional emergency authorities (or, formerly and in Åland, the municipality). There are also volunteer fire departments in cities, but they have a minor role.

There are also junior firefighters in the volunteer fire departments. They are usually 10–17 years old but some fire departments also have "early juniors" that are 7–9 years old.

=== France ===
In France, 80% of the firefighters are volunteers.

=== Indonesia ===
In Indonesia, the city with the largest number of volunteer fire brigades is in Banjarmasin, South Kalimantan province. The city is also sometimes nicknamed "Kota seribu pemadam kebakaran" (The city with a thousand fire brigades). Water access is also relatively easy as rivers are easily founded at the city to be the source of water for fire fighting. The need for more fire brigades in the city emerged when people realized the very frequent incidents of fire, especially structure fire because houses are traditionally made out of wood. Due to high temperatures near the equator, fire incidents are common; thus, many people started or joined volunteer fire brigades to assist the existing government fire brigade (the Dinas Pemadam Kebakaran). These volunteer fire brigades are paid Rp 0.000,- but in some cases, some people give them money for charitable reasons.

=== Israel ===
In Israel, volunteer firefighters function alongside paid firefighters in the Israel Fire and Rescue Services. Adult volunteers work either out of the fire stations, in the same vehicles as the paid firefighters or in independent units that operate out of their own fire truck. Young volunteers (ages 15–18) work only out of the stations.

=== Ireland ===
The Auxiliary Fire Service (AFS) in Ireland is a branch of Civil Defence Ireland. The service is usually only called upon for flooding incidents, emergency water supply and large-scale incidents where the resources of front-line fire brigades are stretched.

=== Netherlands ===
In The Netherlands, approximately 80% of firefighters are volunteers. These firefighters do not have to remain at the fire station, but can be called upon based on a pre-determined schedule. When they are scheduled to be on call, they have to be able to get to the fire station within 3 minutes. And even though they are volunteers, they get a decent hourly wage, even for participating in training sessions.

=== Nicaragua ===
In Nicaragua, there are three different groups of firefighters, one commanded by the Direccion General de Bomberos 18 fire station, which has government support; the second is commanded by the Federación de Cuerpos de Bomberos de Nicaragua Benemeritos 8 fire station; the third is commanded by the Asociacion civil Cuerpo de BOMBEROS Voluntarios de Nicaragua 24 fire station.

=== Peru ===
Peru's bomberos are all unpaid volunteers that extinguish fires, clear up hazardous materials, provide aid and assistance during natural disasters, and transport the sick to hospitals, in a 150-year tradition. Citizens apply to enter a training program they must pay for with their own money. During training sessions, they are taught how to put out fires, provide first aid, and use specialized equipment. Upon successful completion of the program, they enter a probation period where they have to prove they are capable of dealing with real-life emergencies.

=== Philippines ===
Volunteer fire services in the Philippines began during the 1960s, a time when fires were a frequent occurrence. Member proficiency for these services has improved since the 1960s due to self-education, training, and experience.

=== Poland ===
The State Fire Service (Polish: Państwowa Straż Pożarna) is a professional firefighting service that covers the whole territory from their stations in cities and towns. In rural areas, however, local inhabitants may create a Voluntary Fire Service (Ochotnicza Straż Pożarna) under proper law. Such volunteer fire services may receive financial assistance from the government for the equipment and staff training. In certain areas of Poland, almost every village has a volunteer fire service, because members enjoy high respect in their community. Volunteer fire services are fully integrated with the emergency system. Any call to the fire emergency number is routed to the nearest state fire service station, which first deploys the nearest volunteer fire service, followed by the State Fire Service.

=== Slovenia ===
The Firefighting Association of Slovenia is an independent, non-profitable, humanitarian, non-political and the highest form of association of voluntary fire brigades and their associations. It operates on the basis of the Associations law and the Firefighting law. It is a union of all voluntary fire brigades, all voluntary industrial fire brigades and their fire brigades, which are organized at the municipal, inter-municipal and regional level.

The Firefighting Association of Slovenia was founded in 1949 in Ljubljana, as the successor to all previous associations of fire brigade organizations. Since then, it has been performing the duties of the umbrella fire organization in the Republic of Slovenia and has been a member of CTIF since 1992. There are over 165000 members in 1341 volunteer fire brigades.

=== United Kingdom ===
In the United Kingdom, it is standard for smaller, rural stations to be staffed by retained firefighters, part-time firefighters who are paid for attending incidents and for spending long periods of time on-call known as a retainer fee. A few fire services have volunteer units, including the Scottish Fire and Rescue Service, Mid and West Wales Fire and Rescue Service and North Yorkshire Fire and Rescue Service, where they only get paid their retainer fee, but are not paid for attending incidents The only autonomous volunteer fire service is the Peterborough Volunteer Fire Brigade, which is contracted to provide operations for Cambridgeshire Fire and Rescue Service. Other voluntary fire brigades existed in the past, but no others have existed since the disbanding of the Auxiliary Fire Service in 1968.

=== United States ===
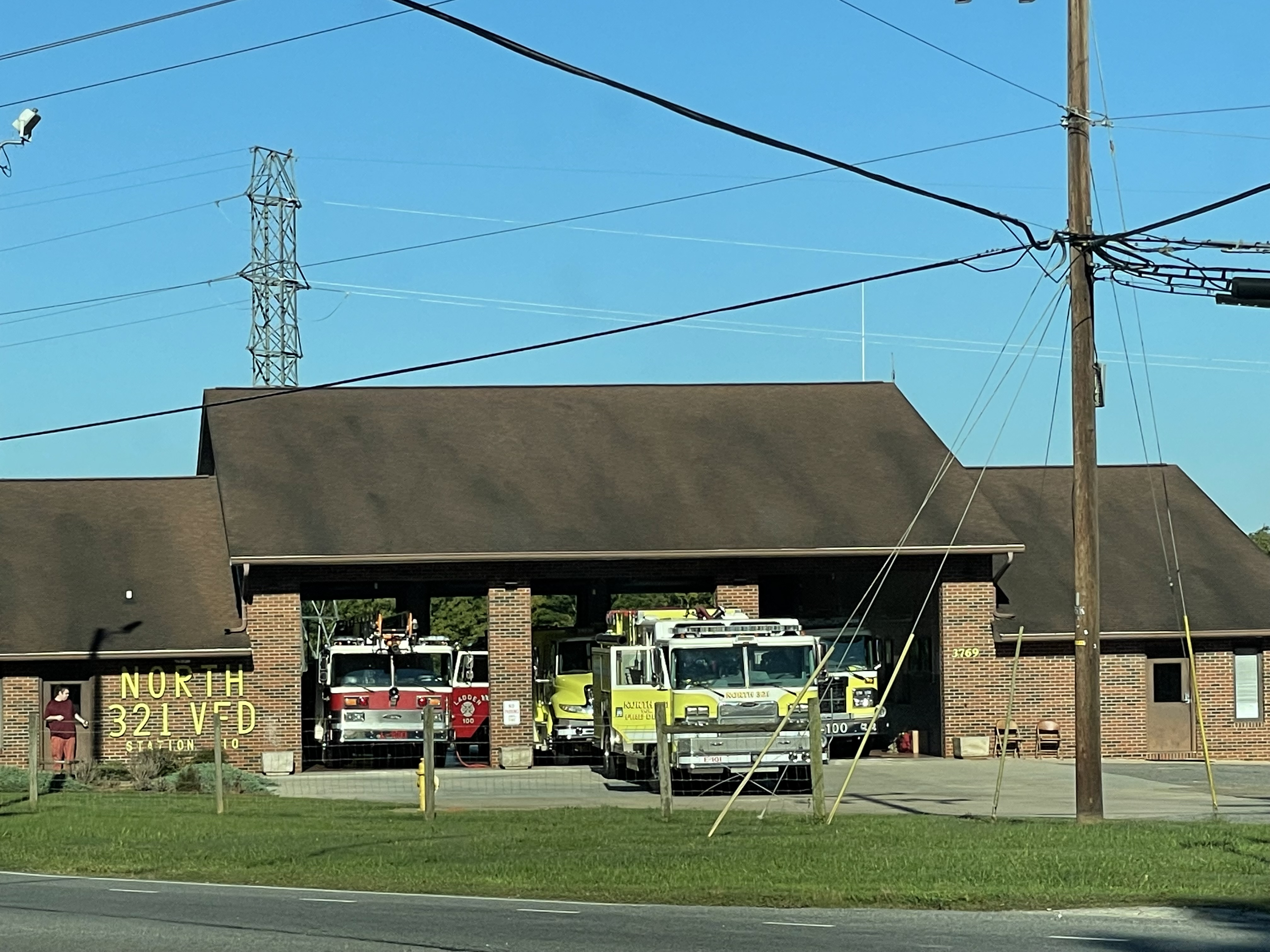
Volunteer Fire Department (Vol. F.D.) station in Lincolnton, North Carolina

According to the National Fire Protection Association, 54 percent of firefighters in the United States are volunteers. The Volunteer Firefighter Alliance represents Volunteer Firefighters across the U.S. The National Volunteer Fire Council (NVFC) represents fire and emergency services on a national level, providing advocacy, information, resources, and programs to support volunteer first responders. The NVFC includes 49 state-based firefighter associations, such as the Firefighters Association of the State of New York (FASNY), which provides information, education, and training for the volunteer fire and emergency medical services throughout New York State.

Volunteer firefighters go through some or all of the same training that career personnel do, although the training varies among jurisdictions. When volunteers join a department, they often enroll in firefighting classes and other certifications that teach them how to become volunteer firefighters. Examples of these certifications include Firefighter I, Firefighter II, S-130/S-190, Emergency Medical Responder, and Emergency Medical Technician. Some departments also require recruits to complete a specified amount of in-house training. During this time, often called the probationary period, the recruit is known as a probationary firefighter, or 'probie'. Once the probationary period is completed, the member is eligible to become a fully qualified firefighter.

In the United States, the Department of Labor classifies volunteer firefighters as firefighters that receive no compensation or nominal fees up to 20% of the compensation a full-time firefighter would receive in the same capacity. The DOL allows volunteer firefighters to receive benefits such as worker's compensation, health insurance, life insurance, disability insurance, pension plans, length of service awards, and property tax relief. DOL-defined volunteer firefighters may be paid nominal fees on a per-call basis, per-shift basis, or various service requirements, but they may not be compensated based on productivity or with an hourly wage.

The terms 'part paid' and 'paid on-call' refer to firefighters who are receiving some compensation, but less than the compensation a full-time firefighter would receive. The terms may refer to volunteer firefighters who do not qualify as volunteers under the United States Department of Labor. These individuals may also volunteer time for training, public education, fund-raising, and other non-emergency department-related activities.

In late 19th and early 20th century American slang, volunteer firefighters were referred to as 'vamps', although the origin of this is obscure.

== Financial support ==
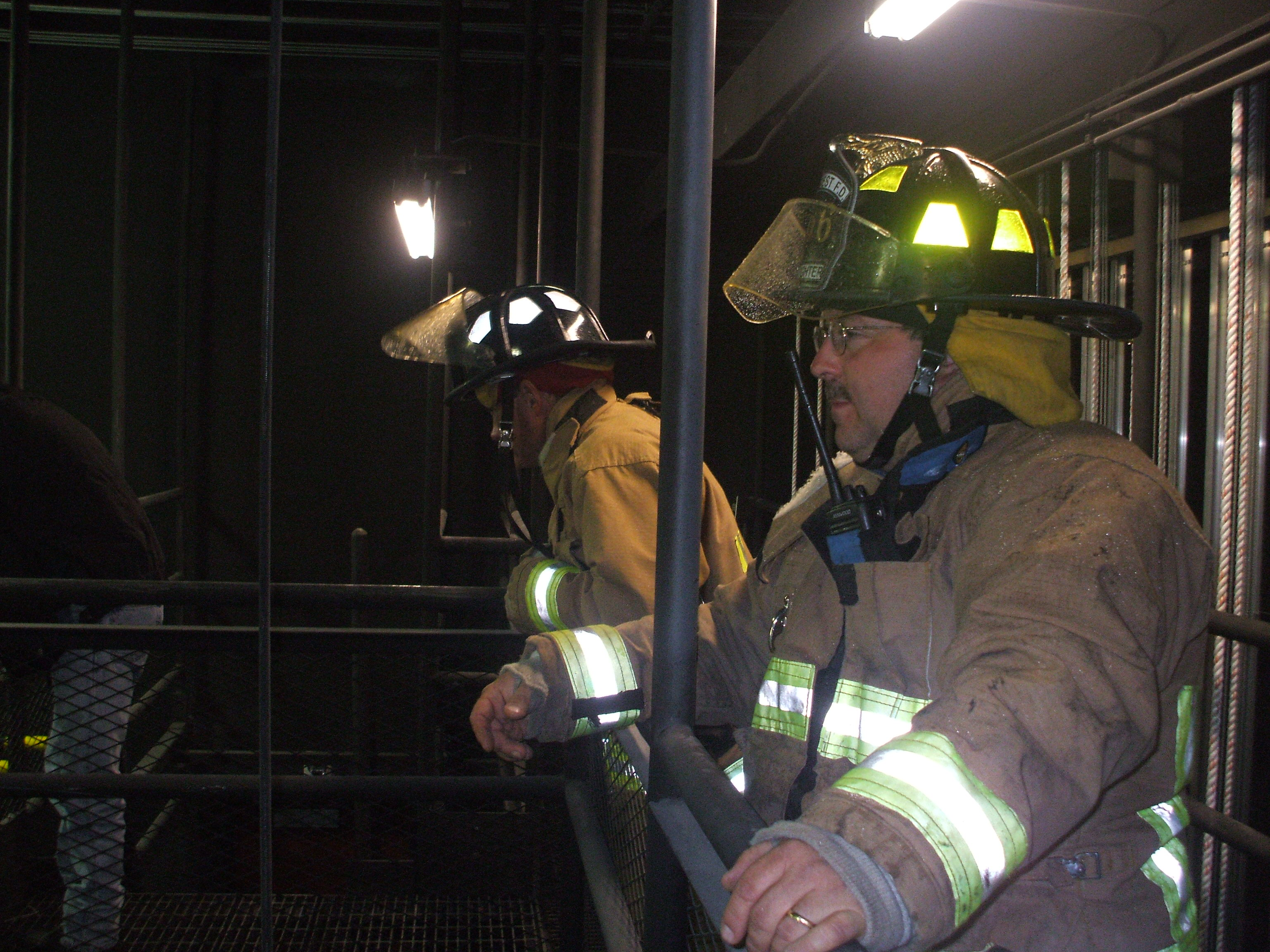
Two Demorest, Georgia volunteer fire fighters respond to an emergency call.

A VFD may be financially supported by taxes raised in a city, town, county, fire district, or other governmental entity, as well as corporate and other private donations, federal grants, and other assistance from auxiliary members, or firefighters' associations.

With these funds, the VFD acquires and operates the firefighting apparatus, equips and trains the firefighters, maintains the firehouse, and possibly also covers insurance, worker's compensation, and other post-injury or retirement benefits. A VFD (or its governing entity) may also contract with other nearby departments to cover each other in a mutual aid (or automatic aid) pact as a means of assisting each other with equipment and manpower as necessary.

=== Germany ===
The material and extraordinary training of the Federal Agency for technical Relief (THW) is funded as a federal agency by the federal government of Germany. 99.7755% of the members volunteer their time. German volunteer fire departments generally get the bulk of their funding from the municipality, but also receive money from the state. They also often get money from the community through events and fundraisers.

== Expanded duties ==
Depending upon the location and availability of other services, a VFD may be responsible for controlling structure fires as well as forest fires. Because it may be the only emergency services department for some distance, a rural VFD may also include community first responders, emergency medical technicians, hazardous materials response, and other specially qualified rescue personnel. Law enforcement officers may also be trained in these related duties and overlap with the VFD. The VFD may also have duties as the local fire inspectors, arson investigators, and as fire safety and prevention education, in addition to being the local civil defense or disaster relief liaison.

== Emergency response ==
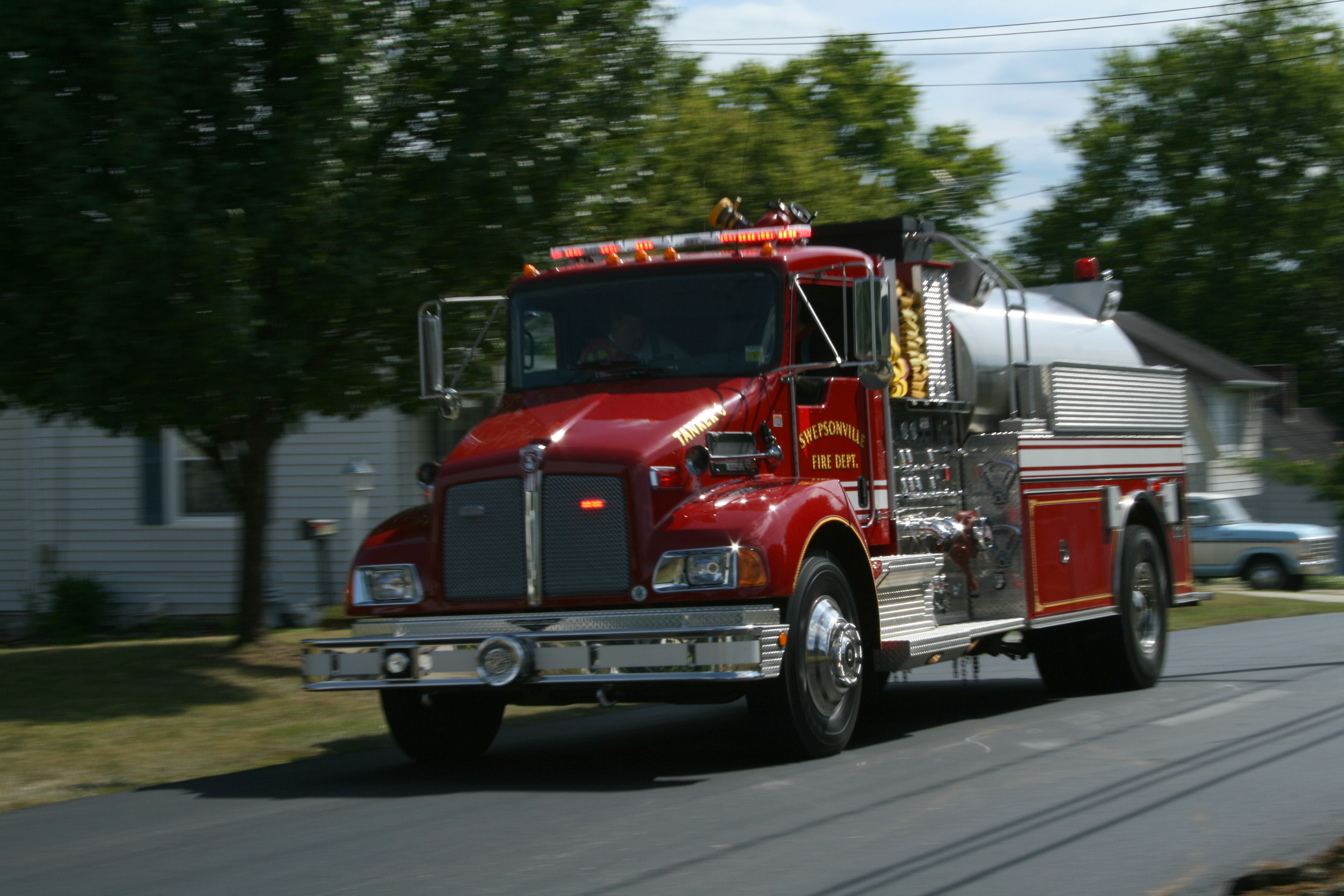
The Swepsonville Volunteer Fire Department responding to a call

A volunteer fire department is normally reached the same way as other emergency services, such as by calling 9-1-1 or 1-1-2. A central dispatcher then calls out the VFD, often through equipment such as pagers, radios, phone apps, or loud signals, such as a fire siren. Average response times are longer than with full-time services because the members must come from different distances to the station or to the incident. Such departments often have a fixed number of firefighters on staff at any given point in time, which sometimes equals the minimal numbers recommended. Some states allow the use of length of service award programs to provide these volunteer departments with a tool to assist in recruiting and retaining members. These simple programs can be implemented with minimal taxpayer expense.

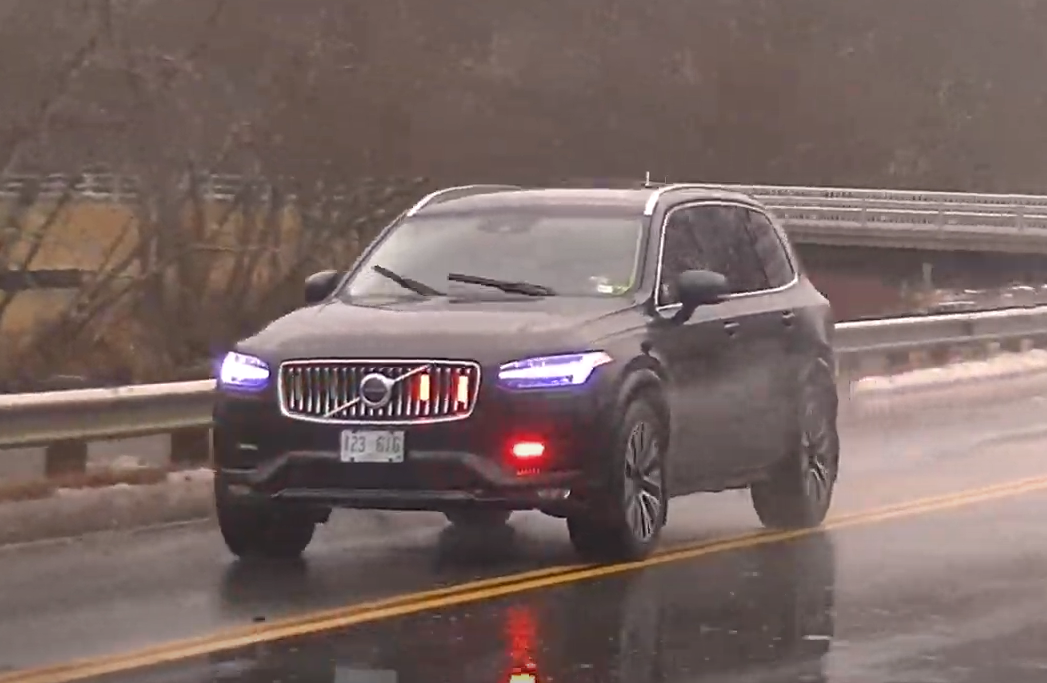
A volunteer firefighter from Sugar Hill responding to a scene in their personal vehicle equipped with emergency lights and a siren

Some volunteer fire departments allow the use of courtesy lights or emergency lights and sirens by their members. In most states that allow both lights and sirens, this is a red light and siren that gives the responding member the same privileges as other emergency vehicles. In other jurisdictions, this may be a green or blue light without a siren. The use of such equipment varies from fire district to fire district based on the need for fast response, the distance that members live from the fire station, the size and amount of other traffic in the fire district as well as local and state law. Some departments restrict or prohibit the use of such emergency lights, even when allowed by state law, due to the increased risk of traffic accidents involving volunteers responding in emergency mode. In some states, volunteer firefighters and EMTs are eligible to receive specialty license plates for personal vehicles that identify them as trained emergency services personnel.

== Training ==
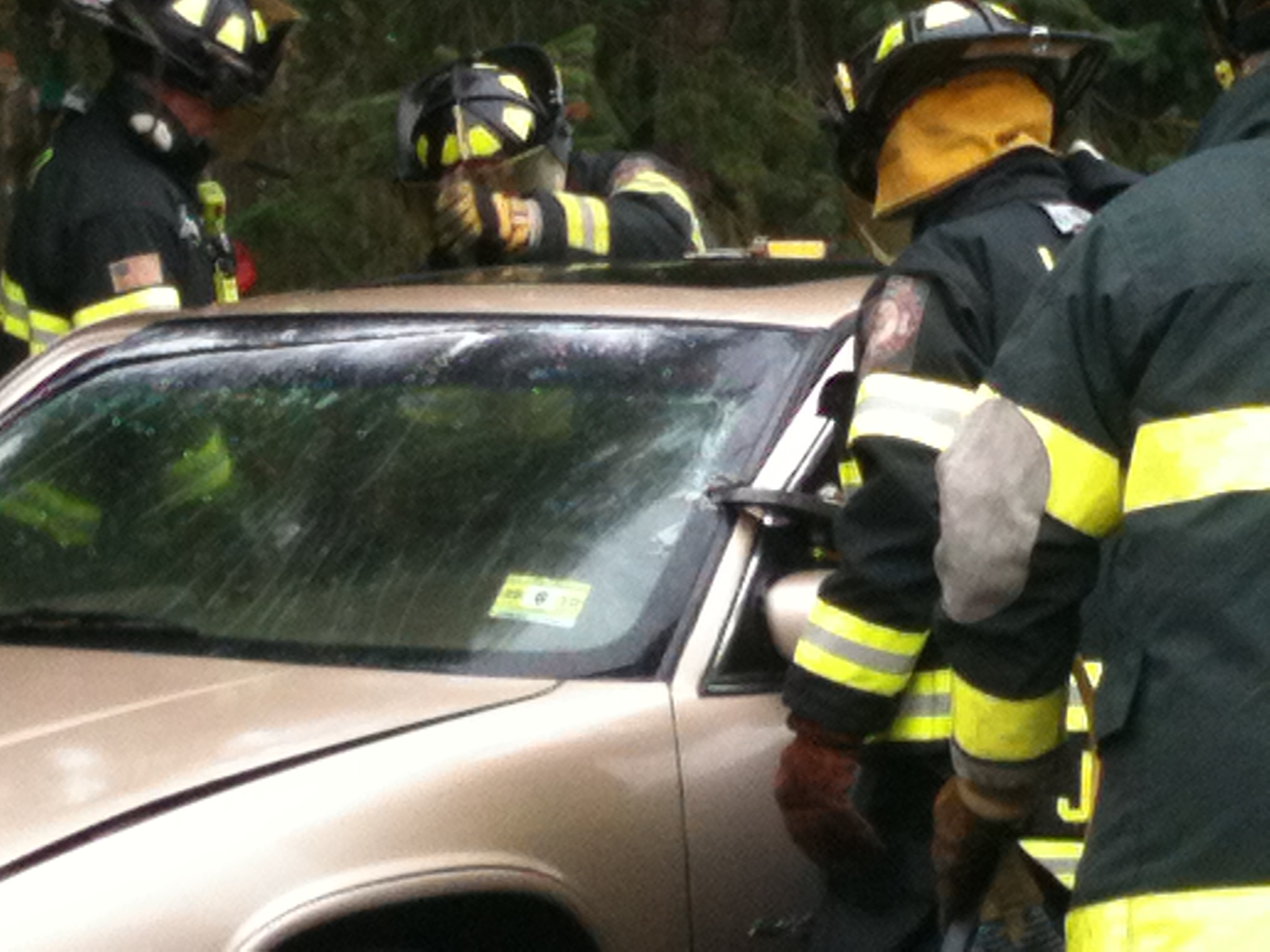
Volunteer firefighters participate in a vehicle extrication demonstration and training at a volunteer fire department open house.

=== United States ===
Operational volunteer fire department members receive some form of training, either in a formal or informal setting, depending on the state and regulatory authority. The level and type of basic and specialty training vary across the country. The National Fire Protection Association (NFPA) has several published standards for firefighter qualifications and training, including Standard for Fire Service Professional Qualifications Accreditation and Certification Systems, and Fire Fighter Professional Qualifications. These standards apply to both volunteer and career firefighters.

New members are referred to as "recruits," "rookies," "probies" (short for "probationary"), or even "red hats" in some departments that require the recruit to wear special gear or markings (such as a red helmet in some departments) to denote their ranking. Some departments allow (or even require) new recruits to ride along on fire apparatus as observers before undergoing the rigors of further fire training.

Firefighters typically progress through formal Fire Fighter I and Fire Fighter II training in accordance with national standards.

Specialty training can include wildland firefighting, technical rescue, swift water rescue, hazardous materials response, vehicle extrication, FAST team, fire instructor, fire officer, and others.

=== Germany ===
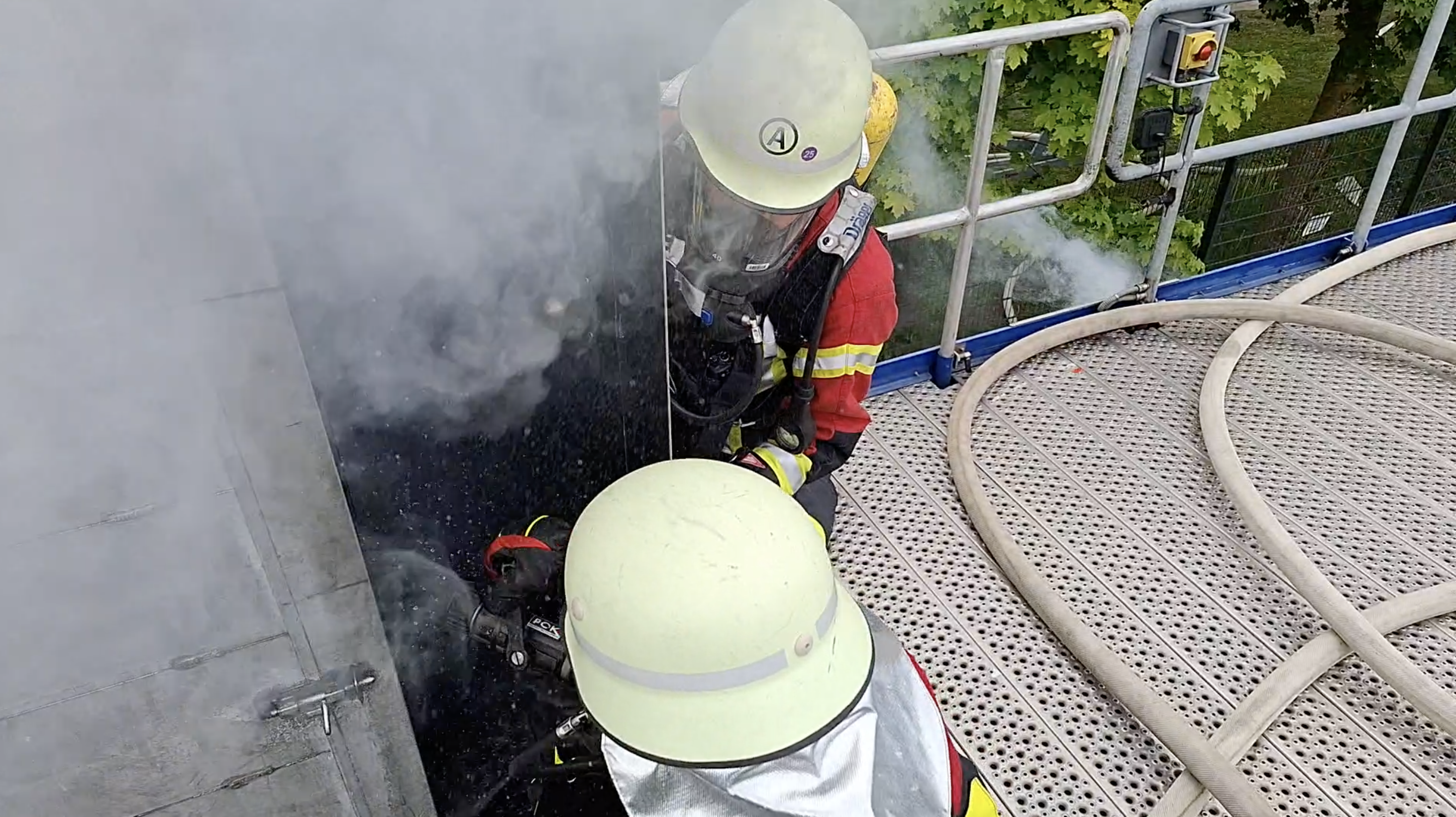
Firefighters from the Überlingen Volunteer Fire Department at a live fire training exercise in Herdwangen

In order to become an on-call member of a volunteer fire department in Germany, the Truppmann Teil 1 training is required. The Truppmann Teil 1 is a 70-hour training module that covers basic firefighting skills such as responsibilities/duties, hydrants, setting up a hose line, extinguishing, technical assistance, ladder rescue, first aid, and more. This is often followed by the Truppmann Teil 2, which is a continual 2 year period of training (with a minimum of 80 hours) generally provided by the fire department. Additional training is also available following Truppmann Teil 1, such as radio operator training (Sprechfunkerausbildung) and SCBA training (Atemschutzausbildung), the former taking 16 hours and the latter taking 25 hours. These trainings open up the ability for additional training to take on a leadership role.

== Open house ==
A VFD may hold an "open house" at their station. The event serves many purposes including demonstration, training, drill, fundraising, and recruitment. There is no particular format for the VFD open house. It can be formal or informal. The goal is to get public involvement in the VFD efforts. It is recommended that the open house should include demonstrations of equipment and show and tell. This allows the public to understand how the volunteers are organized in their local community and it is used as a public relations tool. The combination of demonstrations and drills allows the public and prospective volunteers to see volunteer firefighters in action while they are participating in the practices.

== See also ==
- 1836 U.S. Patent Office fire
- 1877 U.S. Patent Office fire
- Compulsory Fire Service
- List of fire departments
- Medical volunteerism
