= Combination fire department =

A combination fire department or composite department is a type of fire department which consists of both career and volunteer firefighters. In the United States, combination fire departments are typically tax-supported in some fashion, and generally have an annual call volume larger than purely volunteer departments, but less than career departments.

== Career Staff ==
The career staff assigned to a volunteer station will handle all daily operations. This includes but is not limited to equipment checks, essential maintenance, firehouse maintenance, etc. The career staff at a station typically do not answer to the volunteer chain of command, but to the jurisdiction they work for. The career staff in a combination fire department staff a station or unit because the volunteers in that station are unable to respond at some or all the hours in a day (volunteer firefighters have traditional jobs/careers that would prevent them from leaving work and responding to every call while working regular business hours). Furthermore, the volunteer organization may not have the manpower to cover all calls, and the career staff augments them to provide minimal staffing for preexisting jurisdictional requirements.

Career staff are not in charge of the volunteer firehouse. Depending on the staffing requirements, the career staff may be there 24/7, they maintain the station and equipment, but it still belongs to the volunteers.

== Volunteer Firefighters ==
Volunteer firefighters associated with a combination or volunteer department generally respond to the station or directly to an incident when an emergency call is dispatched. Volunteer firefighters operate in the same range as full-time "career" firefighters, responding to fires and, in many communities, also to vehicle accidents, emergencies with hazardous materials, confined spaces, and rescues from water or other situations. They commonly also provide first emergency medical response prior to the arrival of the ambulances.

Some combination departments require their volunteer firefighters to be trained to the same standards as their full-time counterparts. Career firefighters often start with a combination department to acquire experience and training and then attempt to get hired in the career service.

Volunteer firefighters often are compensated in one form or another, and those paid are often referred to as part paid or paid on-call firefighters. Actual volunteer firefighters are few, as it is economically impracticable for fire personnel to be compensated for the time required for requisite training and for the personal costs of responding to dispatched calls. Actual volunteer firefighters are not paid for their time. However, the U.S. Department of Labor has ruled that under the Fair Labor Standards Act (FLSA), volunteer firefighters can be paid a nominal fee up to 20% of the compensation a full-time firefighter would receive. These nominal fees can be based per call or shift or other requirements of service, however they may not be productivity based as in an hourly wage. After a certain number of years of service, some departments offer pension-like programs called Length of Service Award Programs, and some states provide tax breaks to volunteer firefighters. LOSAP, worker's compensation, liability insurance, disability insurance, expense reimbursement, and other benefits can be offered to volunteers without jeopardizing their volunteer status with the Department of Labor. However, under FLSA, a firefighter working for an employer as a career firefighter may not volunteer their time as a firefighter or fire marshal for the same employer. A volunteer firefighter may volunteer as a firefighter for the same agency only if they are employed in a different role.

Part paid or paid on-call refers to the fact that some volunteer firefighters are only partly compensated, and their stipend or pay often does not fully cover the costs associated with being a firefighter, including lost wages from their primary occupation for response to dispatches and training. Their pay may be hourly based and may not qualify for volunteer status under FLSA. In addition, many part paid or paid on-call firefighters with combination departments still volunteer or are unpaid for part or all of the time they spend on training, administrative tasks, equipment maintenance, public education, and fundraising and often cover the cost of supplemental training from their own pockets.

Volunteer firefighters carry radios or fire pagers, primarily the Motorola Minitor, to receive dispatch information where ever they are at the time a call is dispatched. Some combination departments use Nextel cell phones and alpha pagers with priority service contracts to send information to volunteer firefighters. Depending on the response structure of the combination department, the volunteer may respond to the station to pick up an apparatus, or go directly to the scene of an incident in their vehicle with a full-time firefighter bringing the needed apparatus and equipment to the incident. Some combination departments also use volunteer firefighters to cover unfilled shifts of the full-time firefighters. Most volunteer firefighters live or work in the community they respond to fire dispatches in, and most combination departments require residency within the community or a certain distance of the community, in which they serve. Depending on the department, volunteer firefighters may respond 24/7 to any dispatched incidents or be split into response shifts. Response to incidents may be required during transitions, or a periodic run percentage may be required to maintain active status on a combination or volunteer department.

== Auxiliary Volunteers ==
Sometimes departments have auxiliary volunteers who handle administrative functions and fundraising operations.

== Junior Firefighters/Fire Explorers ==
Junior firefighters and Fire Explorers are youths, typically in high school, sometimes junior high school, that learn about local fire and emergency services. They can receive medical training and fire training. Many programs allow them to respond alongside firefighters to incidents, and will enable them to serve generally as exterior firefighters and assist in emergency medical services that they are trained and qualified for. In a combination department, they can provide a basis from which volunteers are recruited from and provide additional manpower under certain circumstances.

== Work Environment ==
In combination fire departments, volunteer firefighters often outnumber career firefighters. This can create a highly complex work environment, as full-time fire personnel are typically unionized employees under contract and volunteers rarely are. Friction can arise in this environment as the career staff are generally at a station more than the volunteers.

Another potential source of friction is the fact that career staff and volunteers are in separate chains of command. The volunteers cannot be reprimanded by career staff and vice-versa. Career staff must also meet a minimum training level often at an associated academy while volunteers have lower minimum requirements. However, in many cases, volunteers have been associated with a department longer than career staff. Sometimes starting volunteer firefighters are perceived as using their volunteer positions as stepping stones to full-time career positions.

Other issues can stem from inequities or resentment caused by bargained-for benefits career firefighters receive under contract, including training wages, shorter gear rotations, clothing allowances, and overtime pay.

== ISO Ratings ==
Insurance Services Office (ISO) fire suppression ratings are independent of whether a department is full-time, combination, or volunteer.
