= Cheshire Fire and Rescue Service =

Fire and rescue service in north west England

Cheshire Fire & Rescue Service

Operational area
- Country: England
- County: Cheshire

Agency overview
- Established: 1 April 1948; 77 years ago
- Employees: 989
- Fire chief: Alex Waller

Facilities and equipment
- Stations: 28
- Engines: 39
- Platforms: 2
- Rescues: 5
- HAZMAT: 1
- Rescue boats: 2

Website
- www.cheshirefire.gov.uk

Cheshire Fire and Rescue Service is the statutory fire and rescue service for the English county of Cheshire, consisting of the unitary authorities of Cheshire East, Cheshire West and Chester, Halton and Warrington. It operates 28 fire stations. The service is led by Chief Fire Officer Alex Waller, who was appointed in 2022, and the Service Management Team. It is managed by the Cheshire Fire Authority, which is composed of councillors from the local communities of Cheshire East, Cheshire West and Chester, Halton and Warrington. They make decisions on issues such as policy, finance and resources.

== Operations ==
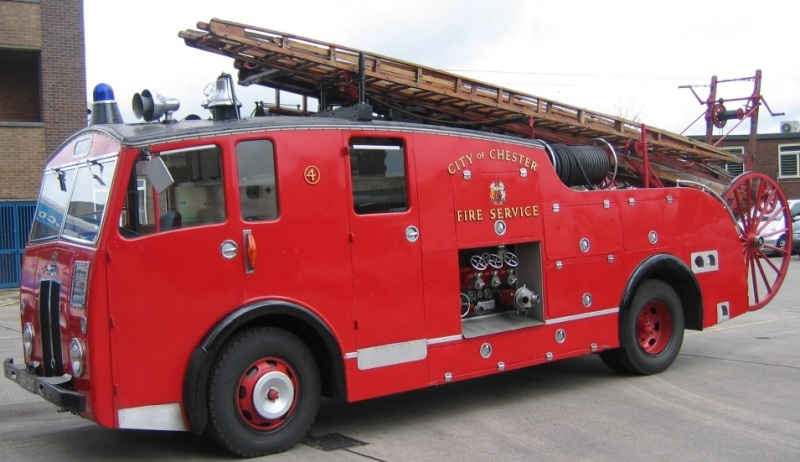
The City of Chester Dennis F7 entered service in 1949.

Cheshire Fire and Rescue Service employs over 980 staff and looks after a population of 1.07 million people spread across an area of 906 sq mi (2,350 km^{2}). It has 28 fire stations, with a headquarters in Winsford. The region features several large urban areas such as Warrington and Chester, an extensive transport infrastructure and one of the highest concentrations of petrochemical industries in the country. It is in close proximity to two major airports: Manchester and Liverpool.

The service responds to emergency incidents - known as Emergency Response (ER) across the four unitary council areas of:

- Halton
- Warrington
- Cheshire East
- Cheshire West and Chester

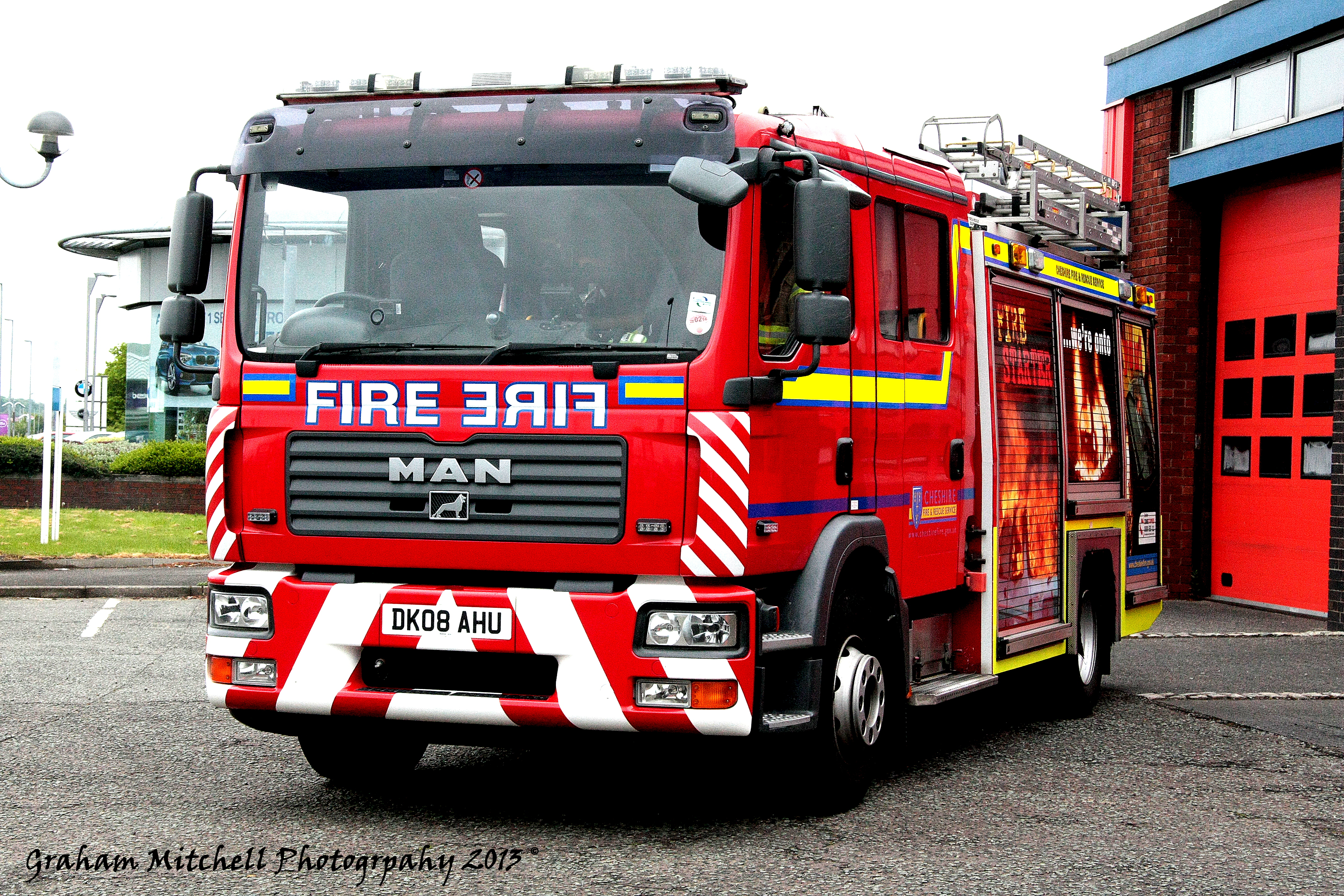
Cheshire fire appliance

A total of 28 fire stations, with 39 fire engines, are strategically sited throughout the county. These are broken down as:

- Seven wholetime-only shift fire stations crewed 24/7
- Two wholetime shift fire stations crewed 24/7, with an additional on-call crew
- Six day-crewed stations (three nucleus) crewed during the day and by on-call staff at night
- 13 stations crewed by on-call personnel 24/7

== Performance ==
Every fire and rescue service in England and Wales is periodically subjected to a statutory inspection by His Majesty's Inspectorate of Constabulary and Fire & Rescue Services (HMICFRS). The inspections investigate how well the service performs in each of three areas. On a scale of outstanding, good, requires improvement and inadequate, Cheshire Fire and Rescue Service was rated as follows:

HMICFRS Inspection Cheshire
Area	Rating 2018/19	Rating 2021/22	Description
Effectiveness	Good	Good	How effective is the fire and rescue service at keeping people safe and secure from fire and other risks?
Efficiency	Good	Good	How efficient is the fire and rescue service at keeping people safe and secure from fire and other risks?
People	Requires improvement	Good	How well does the fire and rescue service look after its people?

== See also ==
- List of British firefighters killed in the line of duty
