= Courtesy lights =

Vehicle lights used to request right of way

Courtesy lights are used to request right-of-way primarily by volunteer or on-call firefighters, emergency medical technicians (EMTs), and other first responders to expedite their response in their privately owned vehicles to their firehouse, base, or directly to the scene of an emergency call. Courtesy lights sometimes allow the user to disobey traffic laws such as speed limits, but usually not laws applying to stop signs or stop lights. Courtesy lights should not be confused with emergency warning lights used in conjunction with audible warning systems (sirens) for emergency vehicles such as police cars, fire apparatus, ambulances, etc, nor should they be confused with warning lights as used by tow trucks, snow plows, construction vehicles and school buses to increase awareness especially when moving slowly or stopped in the roadway.

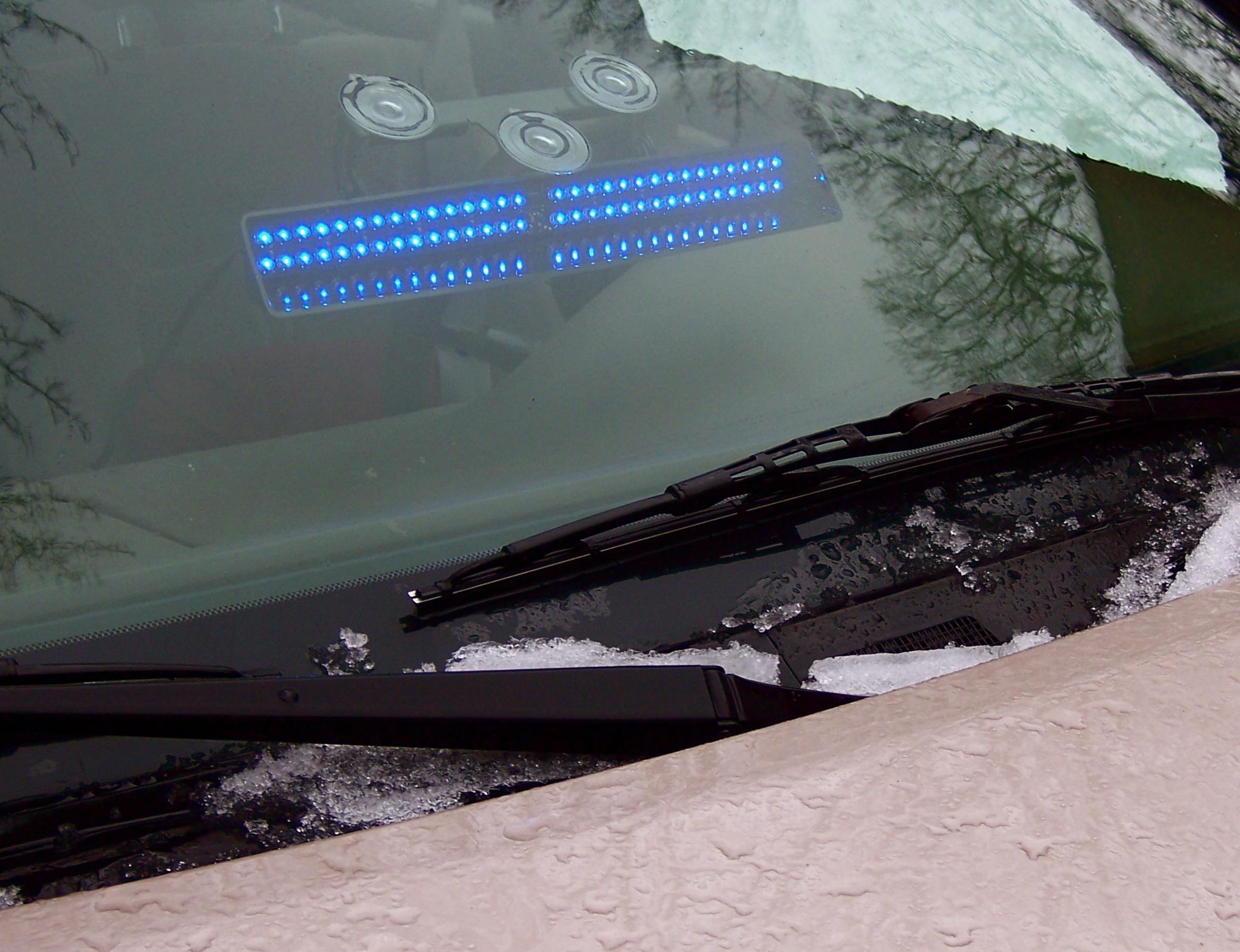
Blue courtesy lights, used by volunteer first responders

== United States ==
A vehicle lawfully displaying courtesy lights is not an emergency response vehicle. In most states, vehicles displaying courtesy lights must still stop at stop signs, red lights, etc. and may not speed or disobey any traffic regulations. Usually, violation ticket fines are increased if the ticketed car was flashing courtesy lights. Laws vary greatly by state.

In most states, other vehicles are not required to yield to the vehicle displaying the courtesy lights, hence the name "courtesy", although laws requiring permits for those using courtesy lights vary by state.

In the state of New Jersey, for instance, users of a volunteer blue light must abide by all traffic laws including speed limit, stop signs, and red lights; however, other non emergency drivers must pull over for a volunteer blue light. State of New Jersey 211th Legislature: "Nothing contained herein is intended to grant to any member of a volunteer fire company or a volunteer first aid or rescue squad any privileges or exemptions denied to the drivers of other vehicles, and such members displaying emergency warning lights and electronic horns shall drive with due regard for the safety of all persons and shall obey all the traffic laws of this State including R.S.39:4-81, provided, however, that the drivers of non-emergency vehicles upon any highway shall yield the right of way to the vehicle of any member of a volunteer fire company or a volunteer first aid or rescue squad displaying emergency warning lights or an electronic horn in the same manner as is provided for authorized emergency vehicles pursuant to R.S.39:4-92."

Police cars, fire trucks, ambulances or other emergency vehicles have sirens and red and blue or red and white or red lights. Private vehicles operated by volunteer fire and rescue squad members (with emergency vehicle identification) responding to an emergency call use blue lights. If an officer pulls a vehicle over for using courtesy lights, the driver will need to provide sufficient identification proving their Emergency Personnel status—badge, ID number, ID card—and their reasoning for usage of courtesy lights.

Ohio is one of the few states that allows the use of sirens in conjunction with lights. Volunteer Firemen and EMTs in the state of Ohio may display red flashing lights and use traditional warning sirens in the same way that a traditional fire apparatus would so long as they pass an inspection by the Ohio State Highway Patrol.

In Virginia, any member of a fire department, volunteer fire company, or volunteer emergency medical services agency and any police chaplain may equip one of their owned vehicles with no more than two flashing or steady-burning red – or red and white combination – warning light units, of types approved by the Superintendent of the State Police.

== United Kingdom ==
In the United Kingdom, courtesy lights may only be used by doctors (registered and qualified) on vehicles, when responding to an emergency. The colour must be green; courtesy lights do not grant any exemptions to traffic laws, similar to many states in the United States. The Road Vehicle Lighting Regulations 1989 grants this lawful excuse to use green lights: "green light from a warning beacon fitted to a vehicle used by a medical practitioner registered by the General Medical Council (whether with full, provisional or limited registration)".

Some doctors work within ambulance services – and ambulances – and therefore some doctors may use blue lights and sirens in this case. Alternatively, some vehicles which are ambulances (or used for that purpose) show blue and green lights.

== Canada ==
In Canada, firefighters in Ontario, Alberta, and Quebec may use green flashing lights in their personal vehicles. The green lights do not provide any exemptions from road rules, but they are intended to ask the right of way from other road users.

In the case of the 10 Canadian provinces, Saskatchewan and Manitoba are the only 2 of 10 Provinces that legally recognizes firefighters' personal vehicles as emergency vehicles, and this includes giving them the ability to break normal road rules, and requiring traffic to pull to the right and stop for these Personally Owned Vehicles when the warning devices are activated in both provinces. Sirens are allowed in conjunction with red or red and blue emergency lights for personally owned volunteer vehicles in Saskatchewan, but Manitoba only allows red emergency lights without sirens.

In the case of the 3 Canadian territories, Nunavut, Northwest Territories, and Yukon, Nunavut is the only territory to follow suit with Saskatchewan and Manitoba, in terms of legally recognizing and treating the Personally Owned Vehicles of Firefighters and First Responders as part time emergency vehicles, similar to Manitoba legislation. Like Saskatchewan and Manitoba, Nunavut volunteers can break the law when responding to the station, or to emergencies, as well as legally compelling traffic and other motorists to get out of their way. Nunavut volunteers can use red lights and sirens.

== See also ==
- Automotive lighting
- Volunteer Firefighters
- Emergency Medical Technicians

== Works cited ==
- Traffic Safety Act (1988). Traffic Safety Act, RSNWT (Nu) 1988, c M-16 (Report).
