= Lansbury Lawrence School =

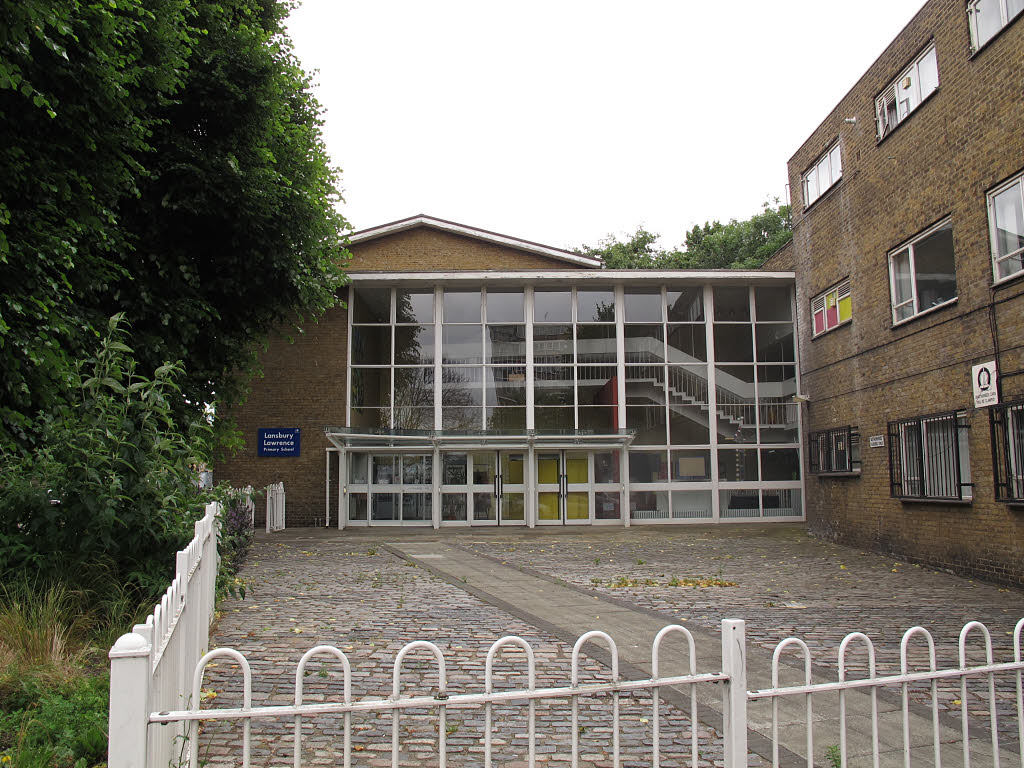
- Entrance to Lansbury Lawrence School

Location
- Cordelia Street; Lansbury Estate; Poplar; London, E14 6ED; England; 51.513416°N 0.016968°W

Information
- Type: Community school
- Local authority: Tower Hamlets
- Department for Education URN: 133574 Tables
- Ofsted: Reports
- Gender: Co-educational
- Age: 3 to 11
- Website: lansburylawrence.towerhamlets.sch.uk

Lansbury Lawrence School (formally Susan Lawrence School) is a primary school in the Lansbury Estate in the Poplar area of the London Borough of Tower Hamlets.

The school was designed by the architectural firm Yorke Rosenberg Mardall. It was built in 1949–1950 and was debuted in the 1951 Festival of Britain as a showpiece of the "Live Architecture" exhibition. The school's foyer contains tiles by the renowned artist Peggy Angus. It was named after Susan Lawrence, an MP who had represented the area.

The school is Grade II listed.

A plaque in the school grounds commemorates the 34 firefighters killed in the 1941 Old Palace School bombing.
