= 1941 Old Palace School bombing =

UK's deadliest firefighter loss incident

The Old Palace School Bombing on 20 April 1941 caused the largest single loss of life of firefighters in the history of the United Kingdom.

The Old Palace School in the Poplar area of the Metropolitan Borough of Poplar was being used as an Auxiliary Fire Service sub-station during The Blitz of World War II. 34 firefighters, 21 of whom had been sent from Beckenham in southeast London to assist their colleagues in east London, were present in the station when it was hit by a parachute mine. All 34 men and women were killed and the school was destroyed.

Lansbury Lawrence Primary School was built on the site of the Old Palace School. The bombing is commemorated by a plaque on the school grounds inscribed with the following words.

In memory of the 13 London firemen and women and 21 Beckenham firemen killed on the night of 19th April 1941 when a bomb destroyed the old school being used as a sub-fire station. This is the largest single loss of Fire Brigade personnel in English history. Details of this tragic incident were recorded in the wartime diaries of Mr W. Somerville, an off duty member of the Homerton crew. It is to him and the many thousands of men and women that made up the A.F.S. and N.F.S. 1939-1945 that this plaque is also dedicated.

== See also ==
- Fire services in the United Kingdom
- List of British firefighters killed in the line of duty
