= Oxfordshire Fire and Rescue Service =

Fire service serving the county of Oxfordshire, England

Oxfordshire Fire and Rescue Service (OFRS)

Operational area
- Country: England
- County: Oxfordshire

Agency overview
- Chief Fire Officer: Rob MacDougall

Facilities and equipment
- Stations: 25
- Engines: 35
- Platforms: 1
- Rescues: 1

Website
- oxfordshire.gov.uk/fire-and-community-safety/oxfordshire-fire-and-rescue-service

The Oxfordshire Fire and Rescue Service is the fire service serving the county of Oxfordshire, England. It is predominantly an on-call fire service, although also has whole-time support.

Fire and Rescue Service Headquarters is in Kidlington, Oxfordshire. This is also the location of the fire service workshops. Oxfordshire's control room is now based at Reading, as part of the Thames Valley Fire Control Centre, in partnership with Royal Berkshire Fire and Rescue Service and Buckinghamshire Fire and Rescue Service. Kidlington's control room now acts as a backup or secondary control in the event of a failure at Reading.

The chief fire officer is Rob MacDougall.

== Performance ==
Every fire and rescue service in England and Wales is periodically subjected to a statutory inspection by His Majesty's Inspectorate of Constabulary and Fire & Rescue Services (HMICFRS). The inspections investigate how well the service performs in each of three areas. On a scale of outstanding, good, requires improvement and inadequate, Oxfordshire Fire and Rescue Service was rated as follows:

HMICFRS Inspection Oxfordshire
Area	Rating 2018/19	Rating 2021/22	Description
Effectiveness	Good	Good	How effective is the fire and rescue service at keeping people safe and secure from fire and other risks?
Efficiency	Good	Good	How efficient is the fire and rescue service at keeping people safe and secure from fire and other risks?
People	Good	Good	How well does the fire and rescue service look after its people?

== Fire stations ==
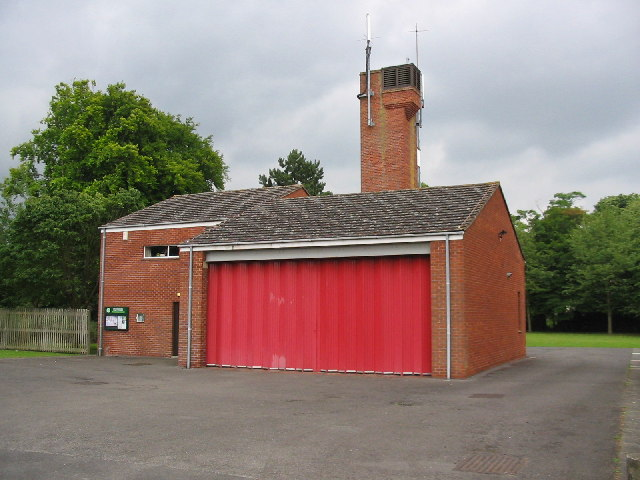
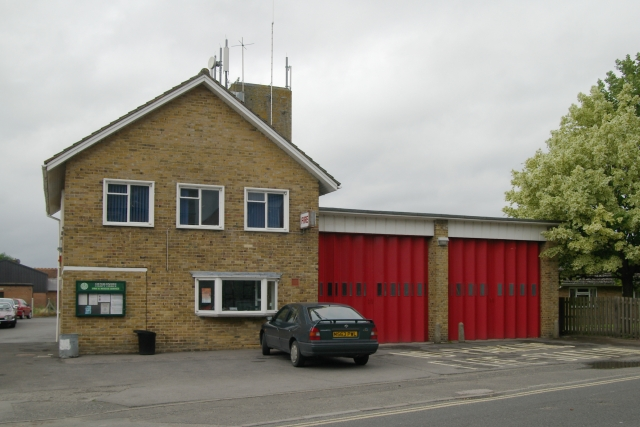
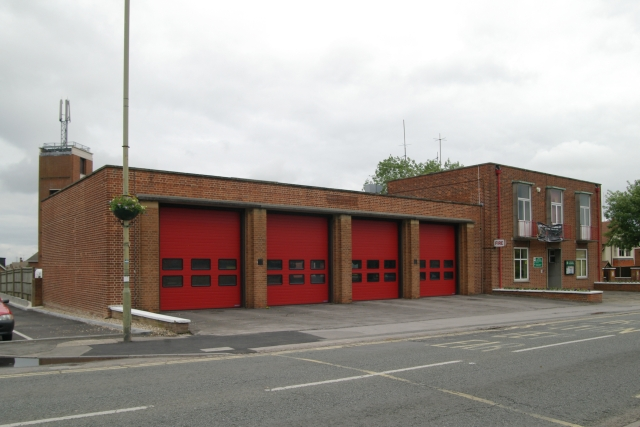
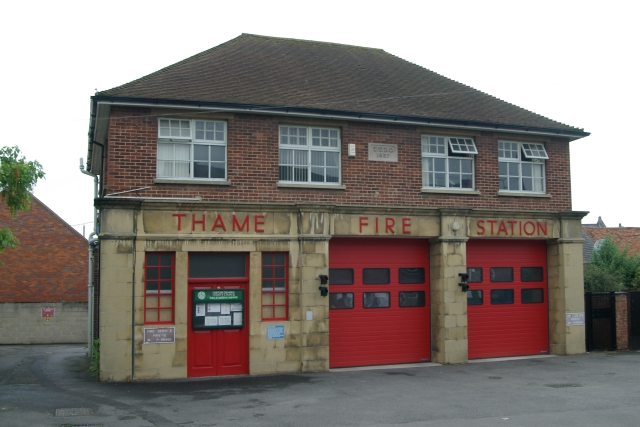
Clockwise from top left: Some of the service's fire stations in Goring-on-Thames, Wantage, Thame, and Didcot

The Oxfordshire Fire and Rescue Service currently operates out of 25 fire stations, three of which are crewed on a wholetime 24-hour basis with retained (on-call) back-up, three stations are day-crewed and retained, and 19 are crewed solely by retained on-call firefighters.

== Firefighters killed in the line of duty ==
On 15 May 2025, two firefighters were killed in the line of duty at Bicester Motion. The incident also killed a member of the public, and two other firefighters sustained serious injuries.

== See also ==
- List of British firefighters killed in the line of duty
