= Peterborough Volunteer Fire Brigade =

Volunteer Fire and rescue service in eastern England

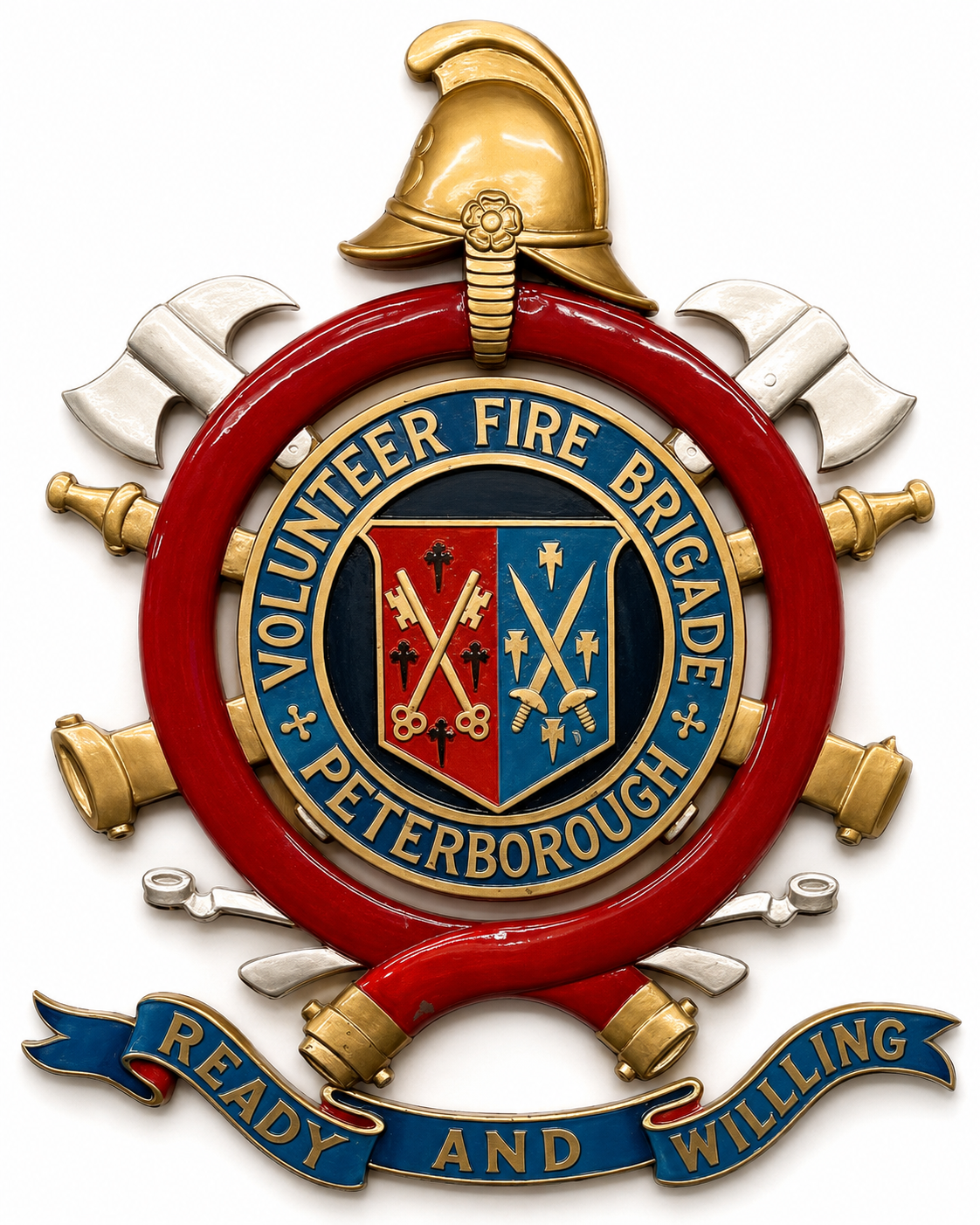

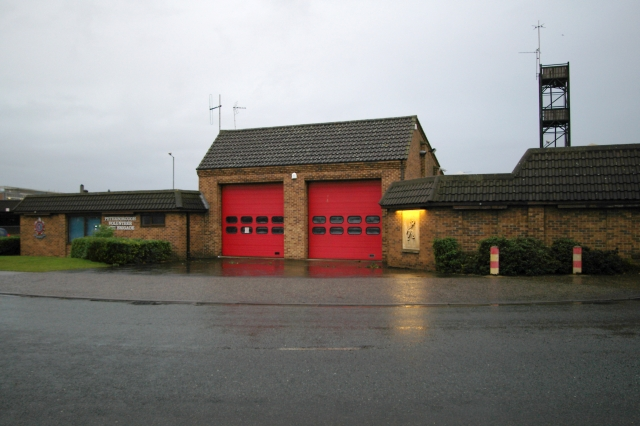
- Peterborough Volunteer Fire Station, built 1984

Operational area
- Country: England
- County: Cambridgeshire
- City: Peterborough
- Address: Bourges Boulevard, Peterborough, PE1 2AF

Agency overview
- Established: 1884
- Chief Fire Officer: Anthony Gould

Facilities and equipment
- Stations: 1
- Engines: 2

Website
- https://www.cambsfire.gov.uk/find-a-fire-station/peterborough-volunteer-fire-brigade/

The Peterborough Volunteer Fire Brigade is an independent volunteer fire brigade which has been operating in Cambridgeshire since 1884.

In the United Kingdom the use of retained firefighters (who are part-time, but are paid when on duty) rather than volunteers is standard. The Peterborough Volunteer Fire Brigade is the only one of its kind remaining in England. Nowadays the Peterborough Volunteer Fire Brigade effectively functions as a retained fire station, except that its members provide their services unpaid.

The Peterborough Volunteer Fire Brigade operates as a private fire brigade under a special contract with the fire authority and as such falls under the jurisdiction of the county chief fire officer, responding to calls as directed by the Cambridgeshire Fire and Rescue Service. Cambridgeshire Fire and Rescue Service also operate two wholetime (Dogsthorpe and Stanground) and one retained (Thorney) fire station in Peterborough. The volunteer fire station, located on Bourges Boulevard, was built in the Brigade's centenary year. It aims to keep one full crew of six people on duty at all times.

Borth Volunteer Fire Unit, part of Mid and West Wales Fire and Rescue Service, Ceredigion command, operates on a similar basis.

== History ==
The brigade was formed by a group of businessmen in 1884, after they believed the efforts of the City of Peterborough Fire Brigade, as it then was, had been ineffective following a serious fire at the infirmary (now Peterborough Museum and Art Gallery).

The Fire Brigades Act 1938 formally constituted municipal boroughs (and urban and rural districts) as fire authorities, taking the responsibility away from insurance companies. During World War II, these fire brigades were combined into a National Fire Service. After the war, the government passed the Fire Services Act 1947, which transferred fire-fighting from the NFS to brigades maintained by county councils. The Soke of Peterborough Fire Brigade merged with Huntingdonshire Fire Brigade in 1965 and the Huntingdon and Peterborough Fire Brigade merged with Cambridgeshire and Isle of Ely Fire Brigade in 1974. Throughout these changes, the Peterborough Volunteer Fire Brigade remained a separate entity.

To mark its centenary, the brigade received the council's highest accolade, the freedom of the city, in 1984.

== See also ==
- Fire service in the United Kingdom
- History of fire brigades in the United Kingdom
- List of British firefighters killed in the line of duty
