= Cambridgeshire Fire and Rescue Service =

Fire and rescue service in the east of England

Operational area
- Country: England
- County: Cambridgeshire

Agency overview
- Chief Fire Officer: Matthew Warren

Facilities and equipment
- Stations: 27
- Engines: 41

Website
- www.cambsfire.gov.uk

Cambridgeshire Fire and Rescue Service is the statutory fire and rescue service for the non-metropolitan county of Cambridgeshire and the unitary authority of Peterborough.

Cambridgeshire Fire and Rescue Service was formed in 1974 from the merger of the Cambridgeshire and Isle of Ely Fire Brigade and the Huntingdon and Peterborough Fire Brigade (which had been formed in 1965 from the merger of Huntingdonshire Fire Brigade and the Soke of Peterborough Fire Brigade); all of which had existed since 1948.

The headquarters are located in Huntingdon.

== Performance ==
Every fire and rescue service in England and Wales is periodically subjected to a statutory inspection by His Majesty's Inspectorate of Constabulary and Fire & Rescue Services (HMICFRS). The inspections investigate how well the service performs in each of three areas. On a scale of outstanding, good, requires improvement and inadequate, Cambridgeshire Fire and Rescue Service was rated as follows:

HMICFRS Inspection Cambridgeshire
Area	Rating 2018/19	Rating 2021/22	Description
Effectiveness	Good	Good	How effective is the fire and rescue service at keeping people safe and secure from fire and other risks?
Efficiency	Good	Good	How efficient is the fire and rescue service at keeping people safe and secure from fire and other risks?
People	Good	Good	How well does the fire and rescue service look after its people?

== Fire stations ==
Cambridgeshire Fire and Rescue Service operates 27 fire stations, of which four are crewed 24/7 (wholetime) and three are crewed 08:00–18:00 (day-crewed) with on-call cover at night. The remainder are purely crewed by on-call firefighters, who live or work near to their fire station and can arrive within five minutes of a call being received.

Peterborough also has a separate 'volunteer fire brigade' (Peterborough Volunteer Fire Brigade) whose training, equipment and mobilisation falls under Cambridgeshire Fire and Rescue Service. It is crewed by volunteers, in exactly the same way as the On-Call firefighters do, but they do not get paid.

== Fire authority ==
Cambridgeshire County Council was the fire authority until 1998 when Cambridgeshire and Peterborough Fire Authority was formed following local government reorganisation in the county. The fire authority comprises 17 elected councillors, 13 from Cambridgeshire County Council and four from Peterborough city council. The full authority meets four times a year at Service headquarters, situated at Hinchingbrooke Cottage on the outskirts of Huntingdon. Meetings are open to the general public.

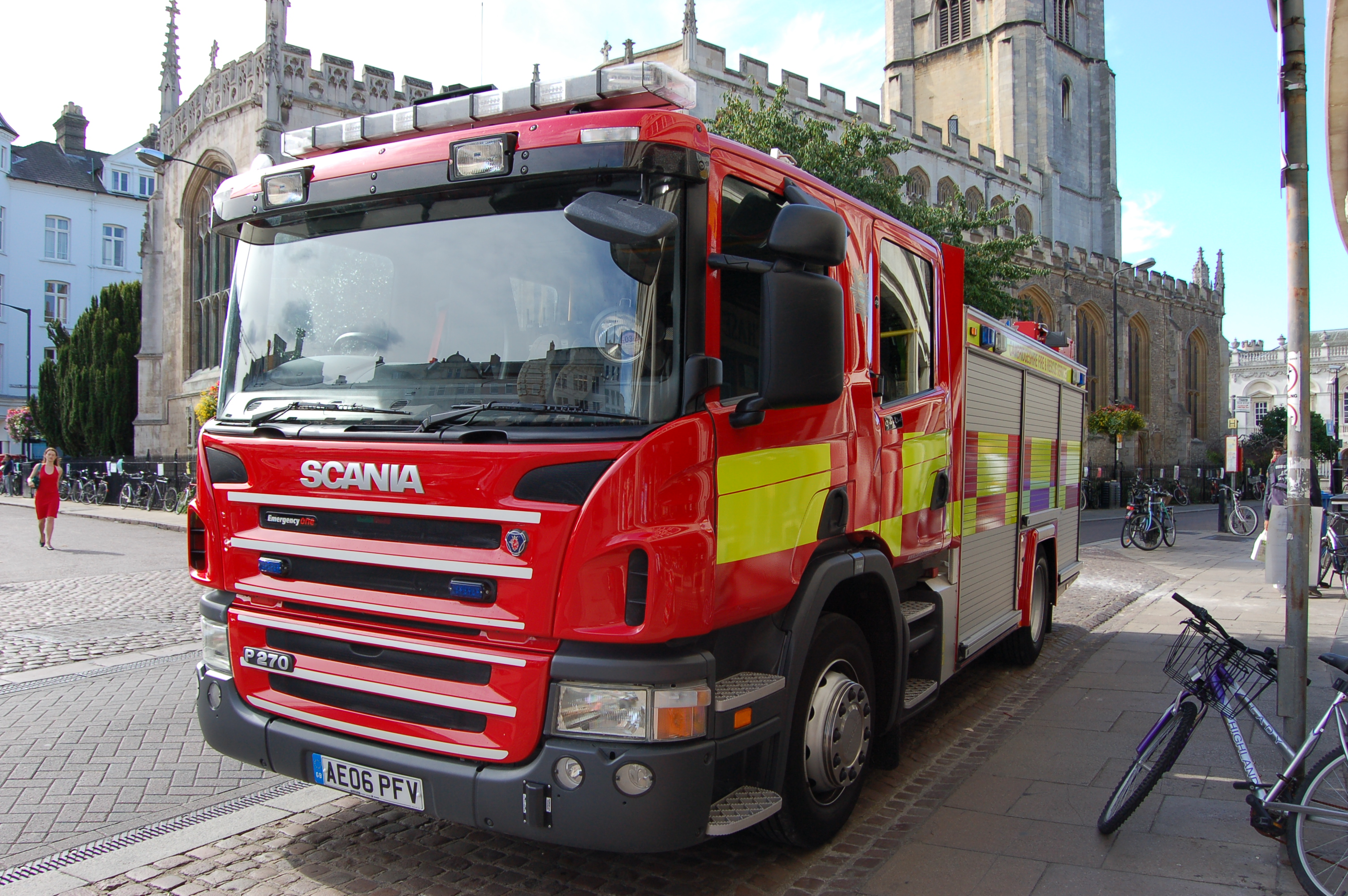
a Cambridgeshire fire and rescue service rescue pump in Cambridge

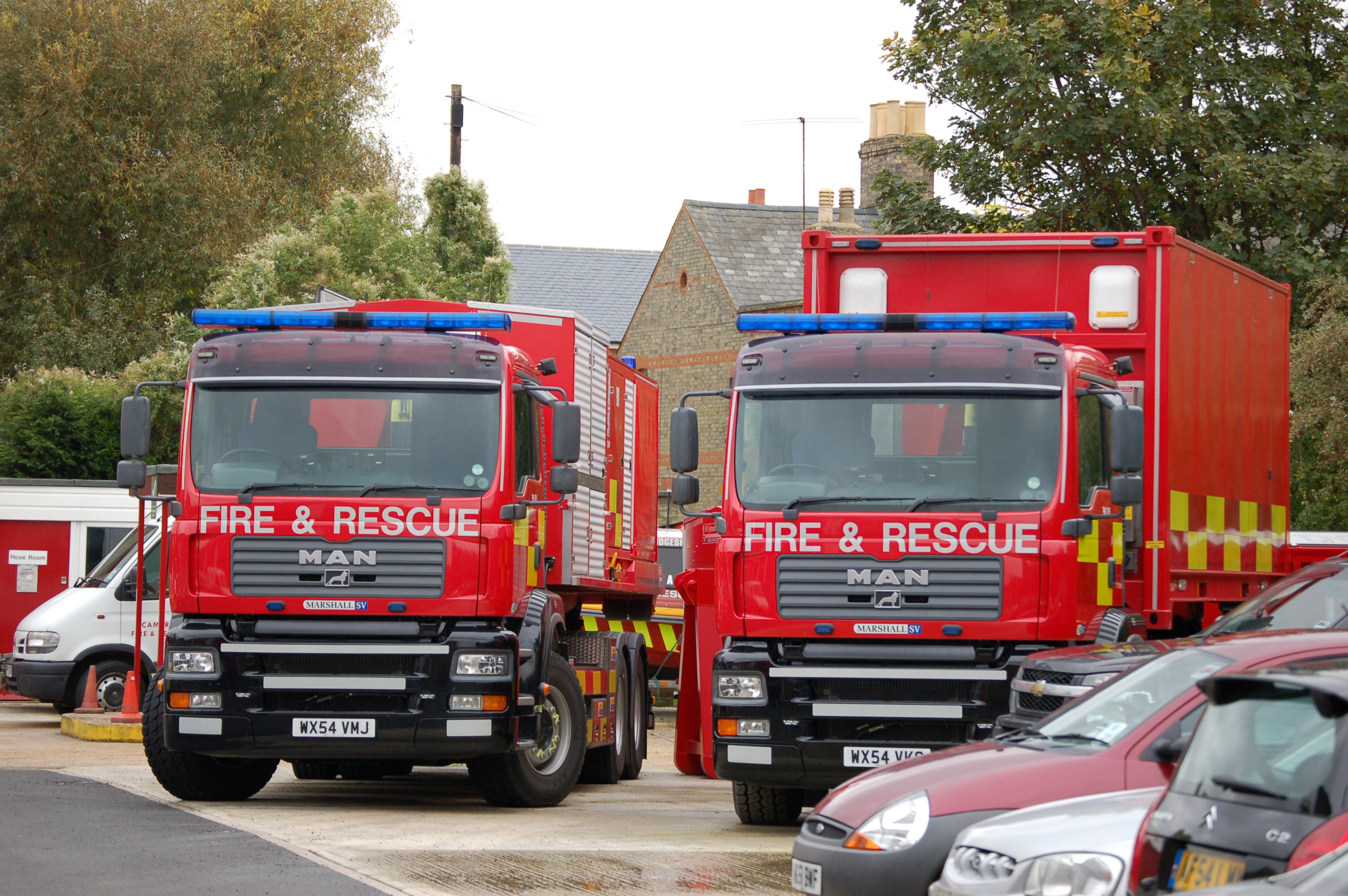
2 urban search and rescue (USAR) MAN prime movers at huntingdon fire station

== See also ==
- Fire service in the United Kingdom
- History of fire brigades in the United Kingdom
- Cambridgeshire Constabulary
- East of England Ambulance Service
- List of British firefighters killed in the line of duty
