= List of firefighters killed in the line of duty in the United States =

This is a list of firefighters in the United States who were killed in the line of duty, either in fires or while responding to other types of incidents.

== 2001 ==
- Daniel Suhr and William M. Feehan, among 343 firefighters killed during the September 11 attacks

== 2013 ==
Yarnell Hill Fire deaths

- Andrew Ashcraft, 29
- Robert Caldwell, 23
- Travis Carter, 31
- Dustin DeFord, 24
- Christopher MacKenzie, 30
- Eric Marsh, 43
- Grant McKee, 21
- Sean Misner, 26
- Scott Norris, 28
- Wade Parker, 22
- John Percin Jr., 24
- Anthony Rose, 23
- Jesse Steed, 36
- Joe Thurston, 33
- Travis Turbyfill, 27
- William Warneke, 26
- Clayton Whitted, 28
- Kevin Woyjeck, 21
- Garret Zuppiger, 27

- Thirteen members of the Granite Mountain Hotshots were killed when the Yarnell Hill Fire suddenly expanded on June 30.

== 2024 ==
- Adam Finseth, 40, firefighter/paramedic killed responding to the 2024 Burnsville shooting

== 2025 ==
- On June 29, firefighters Frank Harwood, 42 and John Morrison, 52 were both killed by a sniper after crews responded to a brush fire on Canfield Mountain in Idaho. The sniper was later found dead after a gun battle with police officers.

== See also ==
- Line of duty death
- List of the deadliest firefighter disasters in the United States
- List of British firefighters killed in the line of duty
- List of People's Armed Police personnel killed in the line of duty
