= List of British firefighters killed in the line of duty =

This article is a list of British firefighters killed in the line of duty since 1900. As such, it only lists those firefighters (Note: The term firefighter is used as it is not gender-specific. Most deaths will have originally been reported as the gender-specific fireman or firewoman.) killed or who sustained injuries from which they subsequently died whilst on duty and not those who were off-duty at the time of the event at which they died. (Note: Alex Kent, 25, of Sussex Fire Brigade, died in January 2003 rescuing his brother from a fire in their parents house. Both men died, but the parents survived. Kent was off-duty at the time. Similarly, Divisional Officer James Treacher, 49, was injured by falling masonry in the Clifton Hall Tunnel collapse. He died seven months later whilst still on sick leave, but his death was due to cancer.) It also does not list the 997 firefighters killed during the Second World War, nor any deaths relating to The Troubles in Northern Ireland. Military firefighter personnel are only listed if they died during non-combatant fires or accidents. Some links to the original fire authority areas may link to the present day authority that covers the geographic area.

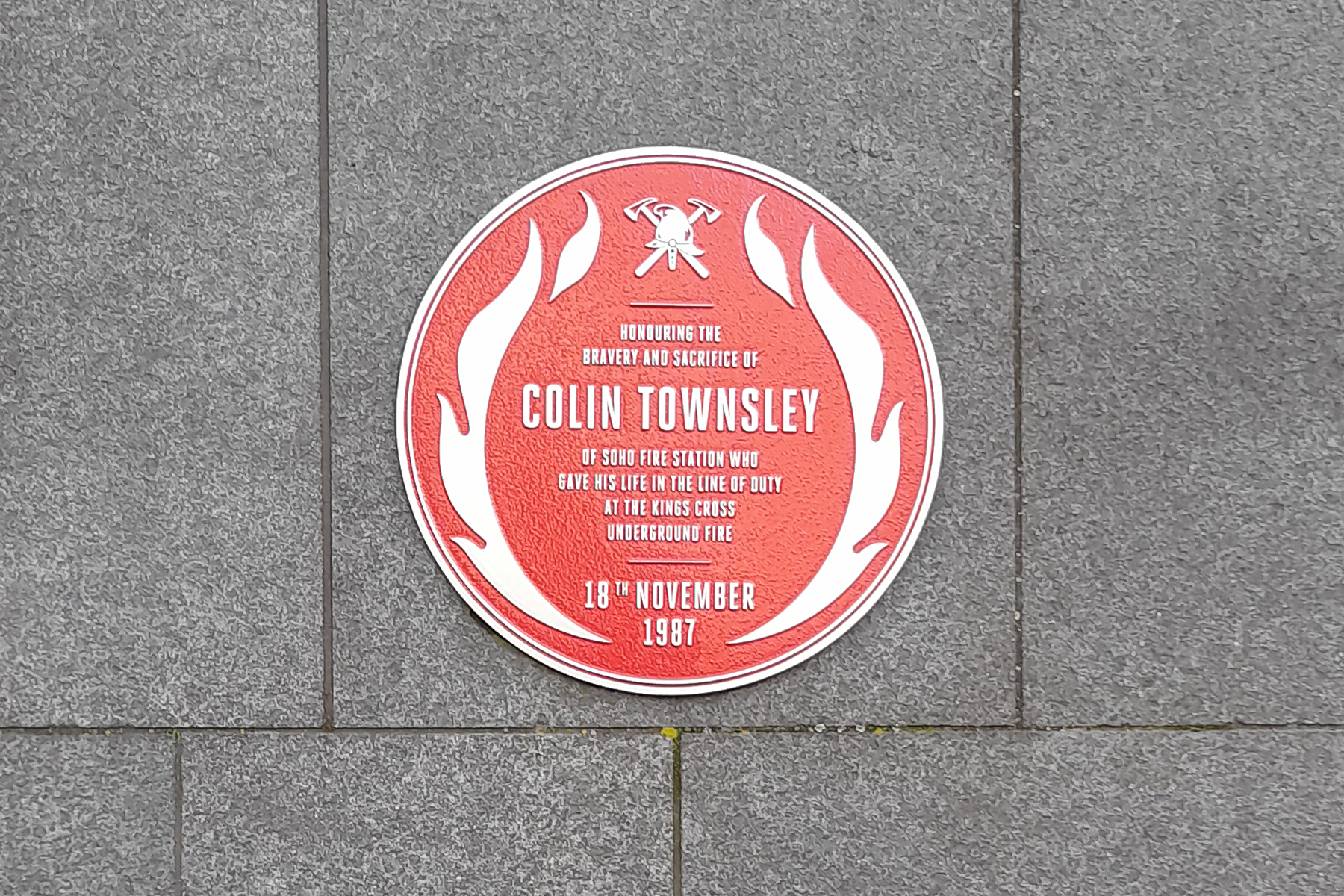
Memorial plaque to Colin Townsley, who died in the King's Cross Fire

For example, the West Riding Fire Service became the West Yorkshire Fire Service in 1974, and during this process parts of the former West Riding of Yorkshire area became part of East Yorkshire (Humberside Fire and Rescue Service), Cumbria, Lancashire and Greater Manchester (see History of fire brigades in the United Kingdom).

During the period between 1941 and 1947, all fire brigades in Britain were amalgamated into the National Fire Service (NFS). (Note: The Peterborough Volunteer Fire Brigade was the only fire service to retain its independence during the NFS years. It is still independent in modern times, though it answers to Cambridgeshire Fire and Rescue Service.) This totalled over 1,600 individual brigades. Some links that point to the NFS may actually link to the fire service that covers the present day geographical area. When the NFS was broken up, it was decided that local county authority control would be the natural way to divide the brigades. This left Essex with one brigade covering the ceremonial county and Southend, which was a county borough, with its own independent fire service.

As more than one firefighter has died at certain incidents, some listings for dead firefighters may refer to the first alphabetical entry from that event. Certain brigades may have been subsumed into other services (Bradford Fire Brigade into West Yorkshire) or completely dissolved altogether, such as the Lancashire & Yorkshire Railway Fire Brigade.

== The Firefighter's Prayer ==
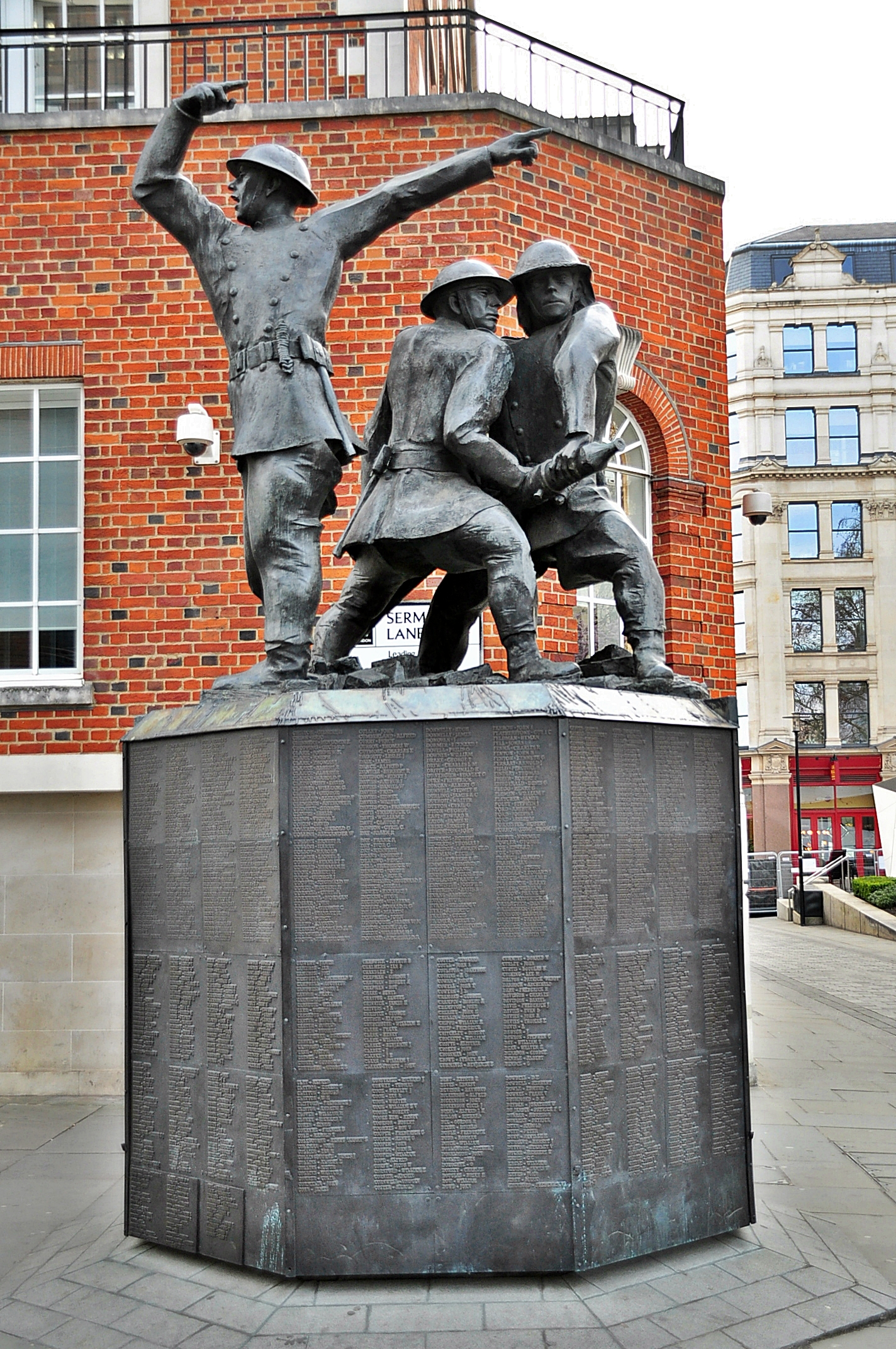
National Firefighters Memorial, Cannon Street, London

When I am called to duty, God,
Wherever flames may rage,
Give me strength to save a life,
Whatever be its age.
Help me embrace a little child
Before it is too late.
Or to save an older person
From the horror of that fate.
Enable me to be alert,
And hear the weakest shout,
And quickly and efficiently
To put the fire out.

I want to fill my calling,
To give the best in me,
To guard my friend and neighbour,
And protect their property.
And if according to your will
I must answer Death's call,
Bless with Your protecting hand,
My family one and all.

— unknown

== List ==
Name	Age	Brigade	Role	Date of incident	Circumstances
Jennie Logan	30	Oxfordshire Fire And Rescue Service	R	15 May 2025	Large fire at Bicester Motion site. Killed alongside another firefighter and a member of the public.
Martyn Sadler	38	Oxfordshire Fire And Rescue Service	R (&W)	15 May 2025	See listing under Jennie Logan
Barry Martin	38	Scottish Fire and Rescue Service	W	23 January 2023	Martin died four days after suffering serious injuries whilst tackling a fire at the former Jenners department store building in Edinburgh.
Daniel Jones	30	South Wales Fire and Rescue Service	W	3 August 2020	Jones died from complications following an RTC in the fire engine he was travelling in
Andrew Moore	50	West Midlands Fire Service	W	16 February 2020	Moore committed suicide in the station and his body was found during the night shift with Red Watch at Wolverhampton Fire Station.
Joshua Gardner	35	Mid and West Wales Fire Service		17 September 2019	Died during a training exercise in Milford Haven after two boats collided
Stephen Hunt	38	Greater Manchester Fire and Rescue Service	W	13 July 2013	Hunt and his colleagues were responding to a fire at a hair salon on Oldham Street, Manchester City Centre which had been allegedly set alight by two teenage girls. Hunt took a wrong turn in the zero-visibility fire and was found collapsed and unconscious. He died in hospital.
Alan Soards	38	Suffolk Fire and Rescue Service	W	2 October 2012	Soards died whilst undertaking a "swift water" training exercise at a white water rafting park in Hertfordshire.
Alan Bannon	38	Hampshire Fire and Rescue Service	W	6 April 2010	Bannon and a colleague were responding to a fire in a tower block in Southampton. Firefighters had difficulties fighting the fire and the coroner's report stated that Bannon and Shears had died after "sudden exposure to initially intense heat from 20.38 to 20.41 and thereafter to excessive heat while dealing with a fire in a flat on the 9th floor of the high-rise tower block Shirley Towers".
James Shears	35	Hampshire Fire and Rescue Service	W	6 April 2010	See listing under Alan Bannon
Ewan Williamson	35	Lothian and Borders Fire and Rescue Service	W	12 July 2009	Williamson died when the floor of the Balmoral Bar collapsed.
Brian Dean	49	West Midlands Fire Service	W	3 December 2008	Dean and his crew (Bluewatch) from Bloxwich Fire Station were returning after dealing with an overturned car incident. Dean suffered a fatal heart attack.
John Noble	46	Central Scotland Fire and Rescue Service		23 January 2008	Road Traffic Collision en route to alarm call at Strathdevon Primary School, Dollar.
John Averis	27	Warwickshire Fire and Rescue Service	W	2 November 2007	The 2007 Warwickshire warehouse fire; A fire broke out at a vegetable packing warehouse near to Atherstone-on-Stour in Warwickshire in November 2007. Averis and two colleagues, Ashley Stephens and Darren Yates-Bradley, were not recovered for four days afterwards due to the instability of the structure after it had collapsed. A fourth colleague, Ian Reid, was pulled from the burning building alive, but died later in hospital.
Ian Reid	44	Warwickshire Fire and Rescue Service	W	2 November 2007	See John Averis
Ashley Stephens	20	Warwickshire Fire and Rescue Service	R	2 November 2007	See John Averis
Darren Yates-Bradley	24	Warwickshire Fire and Rescue Service	R	2 November 2007	See John Averis
Paul Mallaghan	46	Hertfordshire Fire and Rescue Service	W	16 June 2007	Mallaghan was part of a team of firefighters that had responded to a vehicle fire on the hard shoulder of the A1(M) near to Stevenage in Hertfordshire when he was struck by another vehicle. The driver of the vehicle was later sentenced to two years in prison for the offence, although it was observed that there was no criminality in the incident, moreover tiredness was the root cause.
Brian Wembridge	63	East Sussex Fire and Rescue Service	O (Note: Wembridge was the brigade's photographer and videographer)	3 December 2006	A fire had broken out at a fireworks factory in Shortgate, East Sussex, 3 December 2006. Wembridge, along with Geoff Wicker, was killed when a massive explosion sent debris and fireworks across the site. Twenty other emergency workers were injured during the blast.
Geoff Wicker	49	East Sussex Fire and Rescue Service	R	3 December 2006	See listing under Brian Wembridge.
Michael Miller	26	Hertfordshire Fire and Rescue Service	W	2 February 2005	See Harrow Court fire – Miller and his colleague, Jeff Wornham, had already rescued one person from the flat when they went back for another occupant. The fire escalated and all three of them died due to the excessive heat.
Jeff Wornham	28	Hertfordshire Fire Service	W	2 February 2005	See listing under Michael Miller
Billy Faust	36	London Fire Brigade	W	20 July 2004	Faust and his colleague, Adam Meere, were in the basement of a burning building in Bethnal Green, London. An inquest into their deaths later stated that fire officers had not realised the strength of the flames and that a hose had been burnt through. It was also suggested that when colleagues opened doors to vent the building, a flashover occurred and burnt the men to death.
Adam Meere	27	London Fire Brigade	F	20 July 2004	See listing under Billy Faust.
Joe McCloskey	50	Northern Ireland Fire and Rescue Service	W	1 November 2003	McCloskey was killed when the roof of the burning building he was on, collapsed and dropped him onto the flames below. He suffered 95% first-degree burns on his body.
Andrew Edmund Clinton	53	West Midlands Fire Service	W	17 March 2003	Clinton was working at the top of a hydraulic platform at Bournbrook Fire Station when he fell sustaining fatal injuries.
Robert Miller	44	Leicestershire Fire and Rescue Service	W	31 October 2002	Miller died when he fell through the floor of a burning factory in Leicester.
Paul Metcalf	40	Greater Manchester Fire and Rescue Service	R	5 September 1999	Metcalf had responded with his crew from Ramsbottom fire station to reports of a boy who had disappeared beneath the water in Holcombe Brook, Bury, Greater Manchester. Whilst attempting to search for the boy, Metcalf's rope became entangled on branches in the water and both he and the boy died at the scene.
Fleur Lombard	21	Avon Fire and Rescue Service	W	4 February 1996	Lombard died after a flashover occurred at the supermarket blaze she was fighting with a colleague in Bristol. Lombard was the first female firefighter in the United Kingdom to die on active service in peacetime.
Stephen Griffin	42	Gwent Fire Service	R	1 February 1996	Griffin and his colleague, Kevin Lane, were killed in a flash-over at a house fire in Blaina, Wales. They had already rescued one 5-year-old boy (who subsequently died on the way to hospital) and had gone in again after information mistakenly led them to believe another child was trapped in the burning house.
Kevin Lane	32	Gwent Fire Service	R	1 February 1996	See Stephen Griffin.
Roderick Nicholson	43	Tayside Fire and Rescue	W	4 December 1995	Nicholson was attending a call at Perth Harbour where two men had become trapped in a silo containing sodium carbonate ash. Nicholson rescued the two men, but was trapped by the powdered chemical (described as being like "quicksand"), and suffocated.
Robin Neill	39	Northern Ireland Fire and Rescue	R	9 September 1995	Neill had been involved in an attempted rescue of a man who had fallen down a well. The man, Neill and an ambulance worker all died.
John Davies	34	Hereford and Worcester Fire and Rescue Service	R	6 September 1993	During a fire at the Sun Valley poultry processing plant in Hereford, a ceiling collapsed and trapped Davies and his colleague Dave Morris. Both died at the scene.
Dave Morris	35	Hereford and Worcester Fire and Rescue Service	W	6 September 1993	See listing under John Davies
Michael Hill	32	London Fire Brigade	W	10 May 1993	Hill was tackling a fire in a launderette in north west London when the roof of the building collapsed trapping Hill and two of his colleagues.
Kevin John Power	35	London Fire Brigade	W	30 September 1992	Power was killed when he fell from an appliance through an unsecured door and was crushed by the vehicle after it skidded en-route to a call (later identified as a false alarm) in Wandsworth.
Ian James McPhee	22	West Midlands Fire Service	W	28 July 1992	McPhee died whilst fighting a fire in a block of flats in the Lee Bank area of Birmingham. He suffered burns and internal injuries.
Malcolm Kirton	38	Lincolnshire Fire and Rescue	R	2 February 1992	Kirton died during a fire at the Paul Eyre carpet store in Gainsborough. Kirton and a fellow firefighter went in to search for two casualties believed to still be in the store, both firefighters suffered extreme heat exhaustion and Kirton was found by an emergency BA team collapsed inside the store.
Terry Hunt	33	London Fire Brigade	W	10 July 1991	Hunt along with a colleague, died after they ran out of compressed air in their BA sets. Two BA guide lines or safety lines had been laid into the burning building in Gillender Street, Bow, East London, and the two firefighters became confused and took a wrong turn.
David Stokoe	25	London Fire Brigade	W	10 July 1991	See listing under Terry Hunt
Neville Stocker	55	Kent Fire and Rescue Service	W	5 August 1990	Ff.Stocker was engaged in fighting a field fire at Tiffenden Manor Farm High Halden in Kent when he died. The crew had gone into the field to spray water on the fire, when it suddenly took hold and was in the process of cutting them off. Stocker and the others ran for the safety of the fire engine, which was reversing out of the field; two of the fireman were able to clamber aboard, but Stocker fell and was run over by the fire engine. A coroner's report concluded that he had been overcome by smoke which led to him falling under the fire engine, rather than crush injuries being the direct cause of death.
John Singleton	33	Lancashire Fire and Rescue Service		5 May 1990	100 firefighters from the LF&RS were battling a blaze at a furniture store, when a flashover occurred killing Singleton, and injuring two others
John Humphries	41	Cambridgeshire Fire and Rescue Service	W	22 March 1989	Humphries and his crew were tackling a fire on a lorry that was carrying an explosive load in Peterborough. The fire caused a huge explosion and 107 injuries, 80 of which needed hospitalising. Humphries was only 49 feet (15 m) away from the truck when it exploded. A large chunk of debris killed him outright.
Christopher 'Sam' William Betts	28	Norfolk Fire Service	R	1 December 1987	Officer Betts died during the clear up/damping down, after fighting a fire at the Chequers Public House (a thatched building in Hainford) He was killed instantly, when the central chimney stack collapsed on him.
Colin Townsley	45	London Fire Brigade	W	18 November 1987	The King's Cross fire; Townsley and his crew had arrived on the scene at 19:42 and the fire did not initially seem to be too serious however, a flashover event occurred three minutes later that killed Townsley. A total of 30 other people died as a result of the fire.
Ernest David 'Dave' Gregory	46	Dorset Fire and Rescue Service	R	16 October 1987	Gregory and his colleague Graham White were killed instantly when a tree fell on the front of the cab of their fire appliance, whilst driving between incidents on the night of the 1987 Great Storm
Graham White	46	Dorset Fire and Rescue Service	R	16 October 1987	See listing under Ernest Gregory.
John Wixey	46	Oxfordshire Fire Service	R	18 March 1987	Sub Officer Wixey died shortly after reaching hospital from his injuries following a cylinder explosion at a workshop fire in Charlbury. [94]
Ian Bagshaw		Royal Air Force Fire and Rescue Service	W	14 March 1986	Bagshaw, a Senior Aircraftman in the Royal Air Force, died when the emergency vehicle he was in crashed in Lincolnshire. He was serving at RAF Waddington at the time.
Nicholas Mark Walker	25	West Midlands Fire Service	W	29 June 1985	Walker was en route to a rubbish fire at a hospital in West Heath, Birmingham. The fire engine he was travelling in was involved in a road collision, and he sustained serious head injuries. Walker died four days later from his injuries.
Colin Kemp	31	Lincolnshire Fire Brigade	R	1 September 1984	A single storey fire at the Smiths Crisps Warehouse in Lincoln. Fifteen pumps were engaged at the height of the blaze. Fireman Kemp, wearing breathing apparatus, was working in the cage of a hydraulic platform. Without warning the fire erupted from the building engulfing the hydraulic platform's cage and Colin fell to his death.
Derek Potts	37	London Fire Brigade	W	26 June 1983	Potts collapsed and died from a heart attack while fighting a blaze in a residence in Islington, shortly after he had been involved in another strenuous fire-fighting effort in a previous house fire.
Jeff Naylor	31	West Yorkshire Fire and Rescue Service	W	27 April 1983	A house fire in Ingrow, West Yorkshire, was attended by the crew from Keighley Fire Station. Naylor was attempting to rescue three children from the blaze when he was injured. He died in hospital ten weeks later.
Tony Hall	24	County Durham and Darlington Fire and Rescue Service	W	5 September 1982	See listing under John Donley
John Donley	26	County Durham and Darlington Fire and Rescue Service	W	5 September 1982	Donley and his colleague, Tony Hall, were killed when their fire engine overturned en route to a chimney fire in South Hetton.
Robin John Gleeson	29	West Midlands Fire Service	W	19 August 1982	Gleeson sustained fatal head injuries whilst fighting a fire in a paper factory in Walsall.
Barry Trussell	26	London Fire Brigade	W	21 May 1981	Trussell died a month after suffering burns during a flashover in a fire in the Intensive Care Unit of Tooting’s St George's Hospital.
Anthony Marshall	26	London Fire Brigade	W	30 April 1981	Marshall was killed when a building collapsed in the aftermath of a fire, at a Woolworths branch in Wimbledon.
Ian Cameron		Humberside Fire and Rescue Service		2 May 1980	Cameron was killed en-route to a call-out in a road traffic accident.
Stephen Maynard	27	London Fire Brigade	W	25 January 1980	Maynard was one of the BA crew who were caught in the hold of a ship as it erupted into flames and smoke.
Stephen Neill	24	London Fire Brigade	W	1 October 1978	Neill was killed by a wall collapsing while attempting to rescue another firefighter during a major warehouse fire.
David Barnes		Berkshire Fire and Rescue Service		15 September 1977	Barnes was engaged in fighting a fire in Elgar Road, Reading, when the building collapsed onto him.
Neil Goldsmith		Berkshire Fire and Rescue Service		15 September 1977	Goldsmith was engaged in fighting a fire in Elgar Road, Reading when the building collapsed onto his colleague (David Barnes). When Goldmsmith went in to try and rescue Barnes, the building suffered a total collapse and killed both men.
Ian Robert Collier	22	West Midlands Fire Service	W	29 May 1977	Collier was fighting a fire on a railway embankment in Solihull. He was struck by a railway locomotive and suffered fatal injuries. He had only been a firefighter for five months.
John Sharp	31	Kent Fire and Rescue Service	W	27 March 1977	Sharp was buried with two other colleagues when a building on fire in Dover collapsed onto them. Whilst the other two were freed in under twenty minutes, Sharp died of his injuries.
Hylton Brearley	37	West Yorkshire Fire and Rescue Service		9 December 1976	Brearley was killed in Netherton when the appliance that he was in overturned on ice whilst en route to a callout.
George William Barrett	43	West Midlands Fire Service	W	2 December 1976	Barrett was killed in a vehicle accident whilst en route to a fire inspection.
John Raven		Hertfordshire Fire and Rescue Service		17 August 1975	Raven was operating a hydraulic platform, fighting a fire at the Kelloggs warehouse in Welham Green. A wall fell, fatally striking Raven.
Hamish Petitt	25	London Fire Brigade	W	13 December 1974	The Worsley Hotel fire
Robert Bell	29	Kent Fire and Rescue Service	W	8 November 1974	Bell and another firefighter, David Holley, were investigating smoke in a building full of latex mattresses on HMS Pembroke in Chatham Dockyard. It was believed that a flashover occurred and killed the men outright, but it was not known exactly what caused the flashover that resulted in their deaths. Investigations by the Fire Research Station later determined that a smouldering cigarette could cause latex to decompose at low temperatures and allow flammable fumes to accumulate. It was assumed that whilst searching for the seat of the fire, the two firemen turned over one of the smouldering mattresses which allowed an explosive mix of air and flammable vapour to mix and thereby cause an explosion.
David Holley	34	Kent Fire and Rescue Service	W	8 November 1974	See listing under Robert Bell
Robert Crampin	31	Worcester City and County Fire Brigade	W	8 March 1974	Sub officer Crampin and Fireman Keith Marshall were caught in a flashover at a fire at Hurcott Mill in Kidderminster
Keith Marshall	22	Worcester City and County Fire Brigade	W	8 March 1974	see Robert Crampin
Neil McCulloch		Kent Fire and Rescue Service	W	9 January 1973	McCulloch had been fighting a fire with his colleagues in a science block at Upbury Manor School in Gillingham when a flashover caused a burning fluorescent light fitting to fall on him and one other colleague. Despite severe burns, he was able to crawl to the edge of the classroom where his colleagues dragged him to safety, however, McCulloch's injuries were too severe and he died at the scene.
Derek George William Andrews	32	City of Birmingham Fire Brigade	W	25 August 1972	Andrews was fighting a factory fire in Tenby Street when the building collapsed onto him. He received fatal injuries.
Iain Bermingham	29	Glasgow Fire Service	W	25 August 1972	The Kilbirnie Street fire; Bermingham and five others had gone into a burning building to recover a missing fireman at a cash and carry warehouse on Kilbirnie Street in Glasgow. Fireman Rook was listed as missing and as the six-man team were trying to recover him, an extreme flashover event that caused the temperature to be instantly raised to over 1,000 °C (1,830 °F) occurred and all seven died.
Alastair Crofts	31	Glasgow Fire Service	W	25 August 1972	See Iain Bermingham
Allan Finlay	20	Glasgow Fire Service	W	25 August 1972	See Iain Bermingham.
William Hooper	44	Glasgow Fire Service	W	25 August 1972	See listing under Iain Bermingham
Duncan McMillan	25	Glasgow Fire Service	W	25 August 1972	See Iain Bermingham
Andrew Quinn	47	Glasgow Fire Service	W	25 August 1972	See Iain Bermingham
James Rook	29	Glasgow Fire Service	W	25 August 1972	See Iain Bermingham
Archibald McLay	35	Glasgow Fire Brigade	W	3 November 1969	A blaze had broken out in the Scottish Television Studios in the Theatre Royal, Hope Street, Glasgow. At its height, 130 firefighters were fighting the fire which had started due to an electrical fault. McLay slipped and drowned in the sub-basement, which was under 6 feet (1.8 m) of water.
John Appleby		London Fire Brigade		13 July 1969	The Dudgeon's Wharf Explosion; the London Fire Brigade had been called out to a tank farm on the Isle of Dogs in East London when one of the tanks being demolished caught fire. Whilst five firemen were atop the structure trying to pour water in from the top to cool the tank, a worker on the site used a cutting torch to remove an inspection plate at the base of the tank. A spark from the torch ignited the air/gas mix and the tank exploded killing the five firemen and the civilian torch-cutter.
Michael Gamble		London Fire Brigade		13 July 1969	The Dudgeon's Wharf Explosion; see listing under John Appleby
Terence Breen		London Fire Brigade		13 July 1969	The Dudgeon's Wharf Explosion; see listing under John Appleby
Paul Carvosso		London Fire Brigade		13 July 1969	The Dudgeon's Wharf Explosion; see listing under John Appleby
Alfred See		London Fire Brigade		13 July 1969	The Dudgeon's Wharf Explosion; see listing under John Appleby
Edmund Burt	23 (Note: Age is disputed; either 22 or 23.)	Western Fire Brigade		7 October 1968	Firefighters from the Western Fire Brigade (later Strathclyde), had brought a fire at a papermill in Linwood under control when a wall collapsed and buried four people. Burt died from injuries sustained by falling masonry.
William Clark	47	Glasgow Fire Brigade		15 November 1967	Clark had been attempting to rescue four children from a house fire in Cumberland Place. All five died at the scene.
Gordon Robert Dix	52	Norfolk Fire and Rescue Service	W	16 February 1966	Dix and two colleagues died when they were overcome by smoke at a bunker on RAF Neatishead in Norfolk. The fire had been started deliberately and caused over one and half million pounds worth of damage. Because of the potential for confusion in smoke or complicated building layouts, a knotted guide line was introduced nationally after this fire to assist firefighters to identify the correct way to the exit.
Herbert James Durrant	52	Norfolk Fire and Rescue Service	W	16 February 1966	The RAF Neatishead fire, see listing under Gordon Robert Dix.
John Stuart Holman	23	Norfolk Fire and Rescue Service	W	16 February 1966	The RAF Neatishead fire, see listing under Gordon Robert Dix.
Reginald Deveson	56	Kent Fire Brigade	R	11 May 1965	Deveson was helping to put out a fire aboard a ship carrying jute and oil-cake stranded on Deal beach. He had already been at the scene for sometime when he said he was feeling unwell, by the time that a doctor had arrived on the Walmer lifeboat, Deveson had died.
John Whiteside	27	Lancashire Fire Brigade		26 July 1963	A fire had developed in an electric furnace at ICI Hillhouse, near Fleetwood in Lancashire. The furnace was used to heat anthracite to make carbide electro paste. Whilst local brigades (Blackpool and Lancashire) also attended, the fire was fought by the on site ICI Works Fire Brigade. A rush of flames injured seven firefighters with Whiteside dying in hospital on 15 August 1963.
Raymond Morris Pearson	40	ICI Works Fire Brigade		26 July 1963	A fire had developed in an electric furnace at ICI Hillhouse, near Fleetwood in Lancashire. The furnace was used to heat anthracite to make carbide electro paste. Whilst local brigades (Blackpool and Lancashire) also attended, the fire was fought by the on site ICI Works Fire Brigade. A rush of flames injured seven firefighters with Pearson dying a day later in hospital.
J Calderwood	58	Lanarkshire Fire Brigade		7 January 1963	Calderwood and a colleague, McIntosh, were fighting a fire in a paint store at Colville's Steel Works in Bellshill, Mossend. An explosion ripped through the building killing McIntosh instantly; Calderwood died in hospital eight days later.
S McIntosh	48	Lanarkshire Fire Brigade		7 January 1963	See listing under J Calderwood
John J Buist	52	Angus Fire Brigade		13 April 1962	Buist, a Divisional Officer, was killed when a bale of jute fell on him whilst tackling a fire in Dundee.
Douglas Mearns	45		W	2 December 1960	Mearns was in charge of the Glasgow Fireboat and had been called out with other crews to attend a ship fire on the MV Pagensand which was berthed at Prince's Dock in Glasgow. The ship's hold had been alight since it had left Gothenburg carrying matches, paper and other flammable material. The captain ordered that the hold be sealed and when the fire services attended they descended into the hold. Almost immediately there were cries for help and in all, 11 firefighters and one dockworker were overcome by fumes. Mearns could not be revived and died at the scene.
James Allan		Glasgow Fire Service	W	28 March 1960	The Cheapside Street whisky bond fire. Allan, along with 13 other Glasgow Fire Service colleagues and five from the Glasgow Salvage Corps, were killed at the whisky bond warehouse owned by Arbuckle, Smith & Co. Over a 1,000,000 imperial gallons (4,500,000 L; 1,200,000 US gal) of alcohol was stored on the site and a combination of secure-proof building design and narrow streets hampered the efforts of the firefighters. As the alcohol was superheated, a massive explosion ruptured the walls outwards and covered the firefighters on two different streets with falling masonry; one turntable ladder and its crew were completely covered in rubble. 19 firefighters died in all, in what was described as Britain's worst firefighter disaster since the Second World War.
Christopher Boyle		Glasgow Fire Service	W	28 March 1960	See listing under James Allan.
James Calder		Glasgow Fire Service	W	28 March 1960	See listing under James Allan.
Gordon Chapman		Glasgow Fire Service	W	28 March 1960	See listing under James Allan.
William Crocket		Glasgow Fire Service	W	28 March 1960	See listing under James Allan.
Archibald Darroch		Glasgow Fire Service	W	28 March 1960	See listing under James Allan.
Daniel Davidson		Glasgow Fire Service	W	28 March 1960	See listing under James Allan.
Alfred Dickinson		Glasgow Fire Service	W	28 March 1960	See listing under James Allan.
Alexander Grassie		Glasgow Fire Service	W	28 March 1960	See listing under James Allan.
James McLellan		Glasgow Salvage Corps	W	28 March 1960	See listing under James Allan.
George McIntyre		Glasgow Fire Service	W	28 March 1960	See listing under James Allan.
Edward McMillan		Glasgow Fire Service	W	28 March 1960	See listing under James Allan.
Gordon McMillan		Glasgow Salvage Corps	W	28 March 1960	See listing under James Allan.
Ian McMillan		Glasgow Fire Service	W	28 March 1960	See listing under James Allan.
William Watson		Glasgow Fire Service	W	28 March 1960	See listing under James Allan.
John McPherson		Glasgow Fire Service	W	28 March 1960	See listing under James Allan.
James Mungall		Glasgow Salvage Corps	W	28 March 1960	See listing under James Allan.
Edward Murray		Glasgow Salvage Corps	W	28 March 1960	See listing under James Allan.
William Oliver		Glasgow Salvage Corps	W	28 March 1960	See listing under James Allan.
Richard Stocking	31	London Fire Brigade	W	23 January 1958	See listing under Jack Fourt-Wells
Jack Fourt-Wells	46	London Fire Brigade	W	23 January 1958	Smithfield Poultry Market in the Smithfield district of London, burnt down in January 1958. Fourt-Wells and another firefighter, Richard Stocking, became lost in the basement labyrinth beneath the market and were not missed nor reported missing until it was too late. (Note: The two officers were wearing Proto Breathing Apparatus (BA) sets. Their deaths prompted the LFB to initiate a review into BA sets and they style and use was updated. Additionally, a BA tracking board was introduced which meant that someone set back from the fire, knew the location of firefighters wearing BA sets when entering any burning building.)
Albert Farrow	44	Kent Fire Brigade	R	29 November 1957	A fire had engulfed the tailor's shop at Oakwood Hospital in Maidstone. The fire was successfully extinguished, but without warning, an adjacent 115-foot (35 m) tower collapsed on those performing dampening down operations. Many people were trapped under the rubble and three firemen and three hospital staff were killed.
John Hawkes	33	Kent Fire Brigade	R	29 November 1957	See listing under Albert Farrow
Leslie Pearce	49	Kent Fire Brigade	W	29 November 1957	See listing under Albert Farrow
William Edward Wilson	44	Lancashire County Fire Brigade	R	9 January 1956	Wilson died after falling 20 feet (6.1 m) from a ladder during a practice drill at Nelson fire station in Lancashire.
Peter Goodwin	27	City of Manchester Fire Brigade	T	8 June 1955	Trainee firefighter Goodwin, was attempting to perform a ladder rescue drill known as the carry down at the London Road fire station in Manchester. He lost his balance and fell 20 feet (6.1 m)
George Woods	48	Grimsby County Borough Fire Brigade		7 April 1955	Woods and his crew had been called out to a trawler moored in Grimsby harbour with reports of people being overcome by fumes. Woods and two trawler men died as a result of the fumes and other firefighters were incapacitated even though they were wearing BA sets.
Wilfrid Nelson		Lancashire County Fire Brigade		5 March 1955	Nelson was engaged in dampening down operations at Wellington Mill in Greenfield after an extensive fire. Nelson was trying to extinguish pockets of fire on the third floor when it collapsed and he fell 40 feet (12 m) to his death.
Vivian Lewis	37	Essex Fire Brigade	R	5 November 1954	Whilst fighting a fire in a cabinet making works in Harlow New Town, Lewis collapsed and died.
James H Pilling		Leeds City Brigade	W	24 May 1954	Pilling, who was the chief fire officer of the Leeds City Brigade, fell through two floors of the General Electrics mill in Wellington Street, Leeds. Pilling suffered a haemorrhage and subsequently died of his injuries a year later.
Robert Burrows	25	Salford Fire Brigade	W	1 March 1951	Burrows and his crew were on their way to a call in Weaste on the west side of Salford. The fire appliance they were on was a type where the firefighters rode along the outside of the vehicle and held on to a handrail. Whilst en route, the handrail snapped, Burrows and a colleague fell into the road where Burrows sustained head injuries and died. Investigations later determined that water penetration had rotted the wood where the screws affixed it to the appliance.
Reginald Hartley	47	Salford Fire Brigade	W	24 September 1950	Firefighters had been called out to a pickle factory in Salford and had successfully extinguished the flames. In part of the salvage operations later, a faulty wire electrocuted Hartley and he died from his injuries.
Colin Hill	39	City of Sheffield Fire Brigade		5 June 1950	Hill was in the process of rescuing a cat from a tree in Sheffield when it moved higher up the branches. Hill left his 35-foot (11 m) ladder and stood on a branch further up to effect a rescue. The branch snapped and Hill plunged an estimated 40 feet (12 m) to the ground and suffered fatal injuries.
Thomas Watson	27	Halifax County Borough Fire Brigade		27 June 1949	Watson was driving a fire appliance to a grass fire on the outskirts of Halifax when it skidded down a hill and collided with a bus. Both the driver of the bus and Watson were killed with other firefighters needing hospital treatment.
Leslie Marsh	35	City of Birmingham Fire Brigade	W	12 February 1949	Marsh died after suffering multiple injuries when he fell through the first floor of a disused burning church.
Francis Bull Cokayne	52	Gillingham Fire Brigade	W	11 July 1929	The Gillingham Fair fire disaster; every year at the Gillingham Fete, the Gillingham Fire Brigade had a mock three-story house built in which one fireman would play a bride and another the bridegroom. They would entertain a crowd inside the house and deliberately set a small fire from which everyone could escape, then initiate a larger fire so that the brigade could demonstrate their skills in putting the fire out. On this occasion the larger fire was started before the evacuation had taken place and three firemen and 12 boys from the local Sea Cadet troop died.
Arthur John Tabrett	40	Gillingham Fire Brigade	W	11 July 1929	The Gillingham Fair fire disaster; see listing under Francis Bull Cokayne.
Albert Joseph Nicholls	56	Gillingham Fire Brigade	W	11 July 1929	The Gillingham Fair fire disaster; see listing under Francis Bull Cokayne.
Robert Watt	50	Edinburgh Fire Brigade	W	24 April 1929	Sub-Officer Watt was fighting a fire near the university in Edinburgh, when he fell head first into the well of the building. His body was discovered in the burnt out building the following day.
James Conn	49	Glasgow Fire Brigade		24 December 1927	Conn and three other firefighters, died at a warehouse fire in Gallowgate, Glasgow. It was three days before colleagues could recover their bodies.
Harry McKellar	31	Glasgow Fire Brigade		24 December 1927	See listing under James Conn
David Jeffrey	24	Glasgow Fire Brigade		24 December 1927	See listing under James Conn
Morrison Dunbar	23	Glasgow Fire Brigade		24 December 1927	See listing under James Conn
Fred Sharpe	30	Dewsbury Police Fire Brigade		22 November 1918	Sharpe sustained spinal injuries whilst fighting a fire in a woollen mill in Dewsbury, West Yorkshire. Though he survived the fire Sharpe died four months later from his injuries.
Joseph Edmund Binns	29	Bradford Fire Brigade	W	21 August 1916	The Low Moor Explosion; Binns, along with five colleagues and a firefighter from a railway company, died as a result of a massive explosion at the Low Moor Munitions plant, Low Moor, Bradford, West Yorkshire in August 1916. The seven were killed during an attempt to control a fire which resulted in the explosion.
Eli Buckley	29	Bradford Fire Brigade	W	21 August 1916	The Low Moor Explosion; see Joseph Edmund Binns
Edgar Shaw	24	Bradford Fire Brigade	W	21 August 1916	The Low Moor Explosion; see Joseph Edmund Binns
Henry Richard Tunks		Lancashire & Yorkshire Railway Fire Brigade (Note: Tunks worked for the Lancashire & Yorkshire Railway as what was a called a fireman but he was a firefighter and his role should not be confused with the traditional role of fireman on the railway)	W	21 August 1916	Killed in the Low Moor Explosion - see entry under Joseph Edmund Binns
Charles Sugden	44	Bradford Fire Brigade	W	21 August 1916	The Low Moor Explosion; see Joseph Edmund Binns
Knighton Pridmore	48	Bradford Fire Brigade	W	21 August 1916	The Low Moor Explosion; see Joseph Edmund Binns
Fred Normington		Bradford Fire Brigade	W	21 August 1916	The Low Moor Explosion; see Joseph Edmund Binns
Charles Pearson		London Fire Brigade	W	3 January 1911	The Siege of Sidney Street; a wall collapsed on five fire brigademen; Superintendent Charles Pearson, had a fractured spine; he died six months later
William Fraser	28	Aberdeen City Fire Brigade		4 March 1909	First Class Fireman William Fraser, met with a sudden death as the result of being struck with a heavy piece of water rhone. The material, weighing over one cwt, became dislodged from the roof, and swept the fireman from his position on the fire escape – on which he had been at work – to the ground, a distance of nearly 40 feet (12 m).
William Rae	35	Glasgow Fire Brigade	W	24 November 1904	Rae was engaged in fighting a fire at the North British Railway's oil and gas works in Hunter Street, Glasgow. He was killed by an explosion.

Key: W = Wholetime firefighter, R = Retained firefighter, O = Other firefighter staff, T = Trainee

== See also ==
- 1941 Old Palace School bombing
- List of firefighters killed in the line of duty in the United States
