= Length of service award program =

Pension-like reward program

Length of Service Award Programs (LOSAPs) are retirement programs increasingly used across the United States to assist communities in recruiting, retaining and rewarding volunteer firefighters and EMS personnel. With 86% of all fire departments being volunteer fire departments, communities are increasingly seeking tools to assist them in boosting the ranks of volunteers.

The LOSAP is a simple tool that can be implemented cost-effectively and with minimal taxpayer expense. Conversely, if enrollment numbers drop low enough, many municipalities can be forced to convert to paid departments potentially costing states and counties millions in extra spending. Enrollment in volunteer fire departments has dipped 10% in each of the past two decades, making LOSAPs and other recruitment tools extremely important to the communities that count on the nations more than 30,000 fire departments.

A LOSAP is exempt from Internal Revenue Code §457 as a result of the passing of the Small Business Job Protection Act of 1996 on August 20, 1996. This bill amended §457(e)(11) of the Internal Revenue Code with language that excluded “any plan paying solely length of service awards to bona fide volunteers…”

A defined contribution LOSAP is not a qualified plan like a 401(k), 457 or IRA, therefore distributions from a defined contribution LOSAP are not eligible for rollover into a qualified plan.

Since funding of the LOSAP comes from the local government, there may be certain state restrictions or requirements for adopting and administering a LOSAP. Any municipality that would like to start a LOSAP should consult the applicable state laws first. There are some states with specific statutes governing LOSAP, like New York, New Jersey, and Wisconsin. Other states simply authorize municipalities to spend taxpayer dollars on "recruitment and retention", without specific guidelines on the LOSAP.

The maximum benefit that can be accrued for any one year of service was initially $3,000. HR 1, which was passed by the 115th Congress (2017-2018), amended 457(e)(11) to increase the $3,000 limit to $6,000 beginning with calendar year 2018. The bill also provided for a cost-of-living adjustment to be implemented in $500 increments. The benefit limitation was increased to $6,500 for the 2022 calendar year, then to $7,000 for the 2023 calendar year, and was then raised to $7,500 beginning with calendar year 2024.
